= National symbols of Thailand =

National symbols of Thailand are the symbols that are used in Thailand to represent what is unique about the nation, reflecting different aspects of its cultural life, history and biodiversity.

In addition to the country's official emblems, there are three officially proclaimed national symbols, listed in a declaration of the Office of the Prime Minister dated 26 October 2001. Other national symbols have also since been named by other agencies.

== Symbols ==
Type	Symbol	Image	Comments
Officially proclaimed national symbols
National flag	Flag of Thailand ธงไตรรงค์	Flag of Thailand	The design was adopted on 28 September 1917, according to the royal decree issued by Rama VI.
National emblem	Garuda emblem ตราพระครุฑพ่าห์	Garuda emblem of Thailand	The national and royal symbol of Thailand is Garuda, the mount of Vishnu.
National anthem	Thai National Anthem เพลงชาติไทย	Instrumental: With vocals:	The Thai National Anthem was adopted on 10 December 1939. Both instrumental and vocal recordings are provided.
National animal	Asian elephant (Elephas maximus) ช้างเอเชีย	Asian Elephant	One of three national symbols proclaimed in a declaration of the Office of the Prime Minister dated 26 October 2001.
National tree and National flower	Golden shower (Cassia fistula Linn.) ราชพฤกษ์	Ratchaphruek flower	One of three national symbols proclaimed in a declaration of the Office of the Prime Minister dated 26 October 2001.
National architecture	Sala Thai ศาลาไทย	Sala Thai	One of three national symbols proclaimed in a declaration of the Office of the Prime Minister dated 26 October 2001.
De-facto national symbols
National aquatic animal	Siamese fighting fish (Betta splendens) ปลากัด	Siamese fighting fish	Proposed by the Department of Fisheries, endorsed by the Cabinet in 2019.
National bird	Siamese fireback (Lophura diardi) ไก่ฟ้าพญาลอ	Siamese fireback	Proposed by the Wildlife Conservation Bureau and endorsed by the Cabinet in 1985.
National epic	Ramakien รามเกียรติ์	Ramakien	Named by the Fine Arts Department in 2015.
National mythological creature	Naga นาค	Naga	Proposed by the Permanent Secretary of the Prime Minister’s Office and designated by the Cabinet on November 1, 2022.
National pet	Siamese cats (Suphalak, Korat, Wichien Maat, Korn Ja, and Khao Manee) แมวไทย	Treatise on Cats	Siamese cat breeds: Suphalak, Korat, Wichien Maat, Korn Ja, and Khao Manee. Proposed by the National Identity Committee (NIC) and approved by the Cabinet on November 18, 2025.

== See also ==
- Sansoen Phra Barami
- Culture of Thailand
