= Khao Manee =

Breed of cat

Khao-Manee
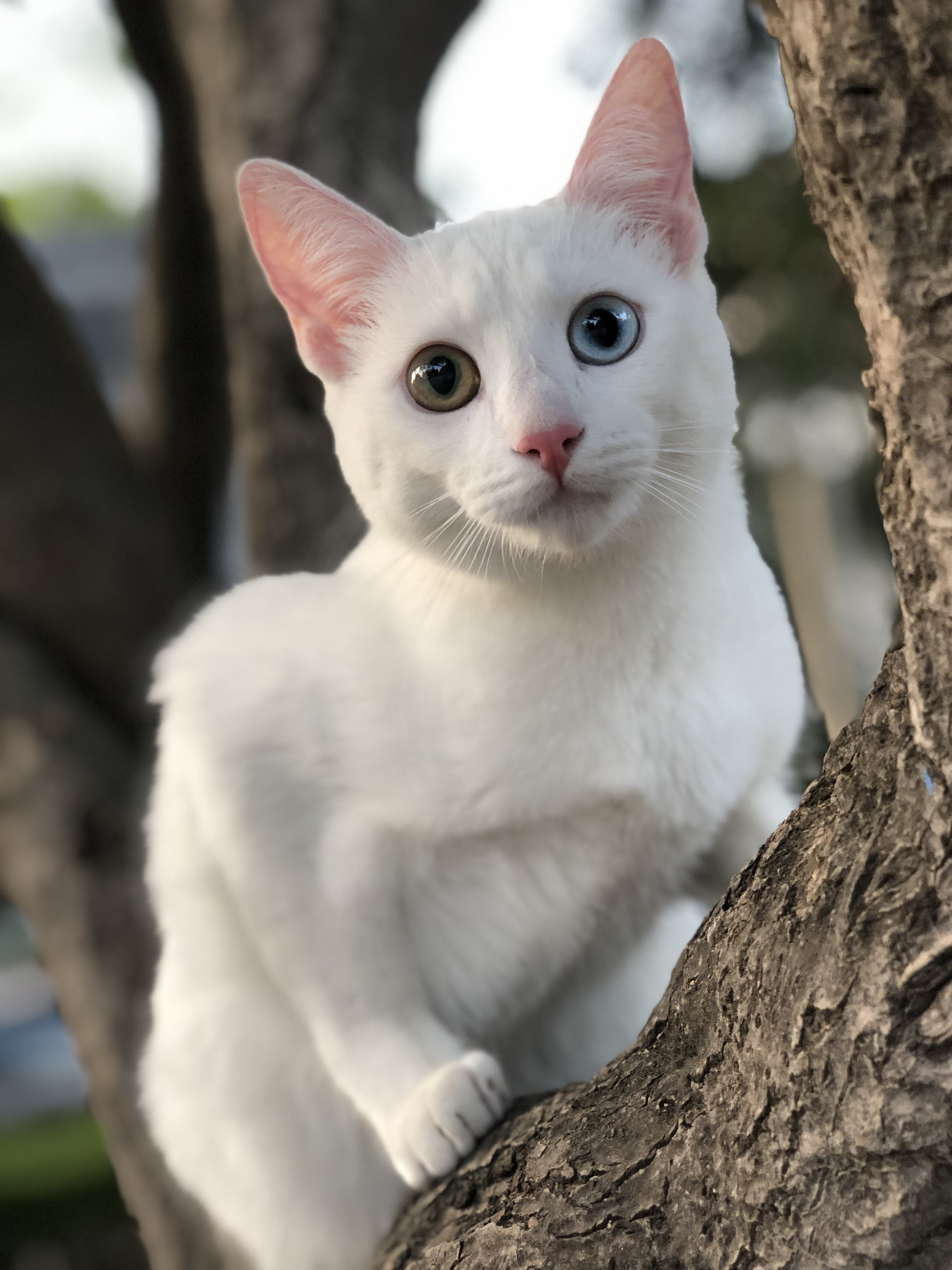
- Odd-eyed Khao Manee cat
- Other names: Khao Plort (solid-white)
- Common nicknames: Diamond Eye, White Diamond Cat, Thailand White cat
- Origin: Thailand

Breed standards
- CFA: standard
- TICA: standard
- WCF: standard

The Khao Manee cat (Thai: ขาวมณี, RTGS: Khao Mani, lit. "white jewel"), or Khao Plort (Thai: ขาวปลอด, lit. "complete white"), also known as the Diamond Eye cat, is a rare, natural breed of domestic cat originating in Thailand, which has an ancient ancestry tracing back hundreds of years. They are mentioned in the Tamra Maew (Cat Book Poems). Khao Manee cats are short-haired solid-white cats.

== History ==
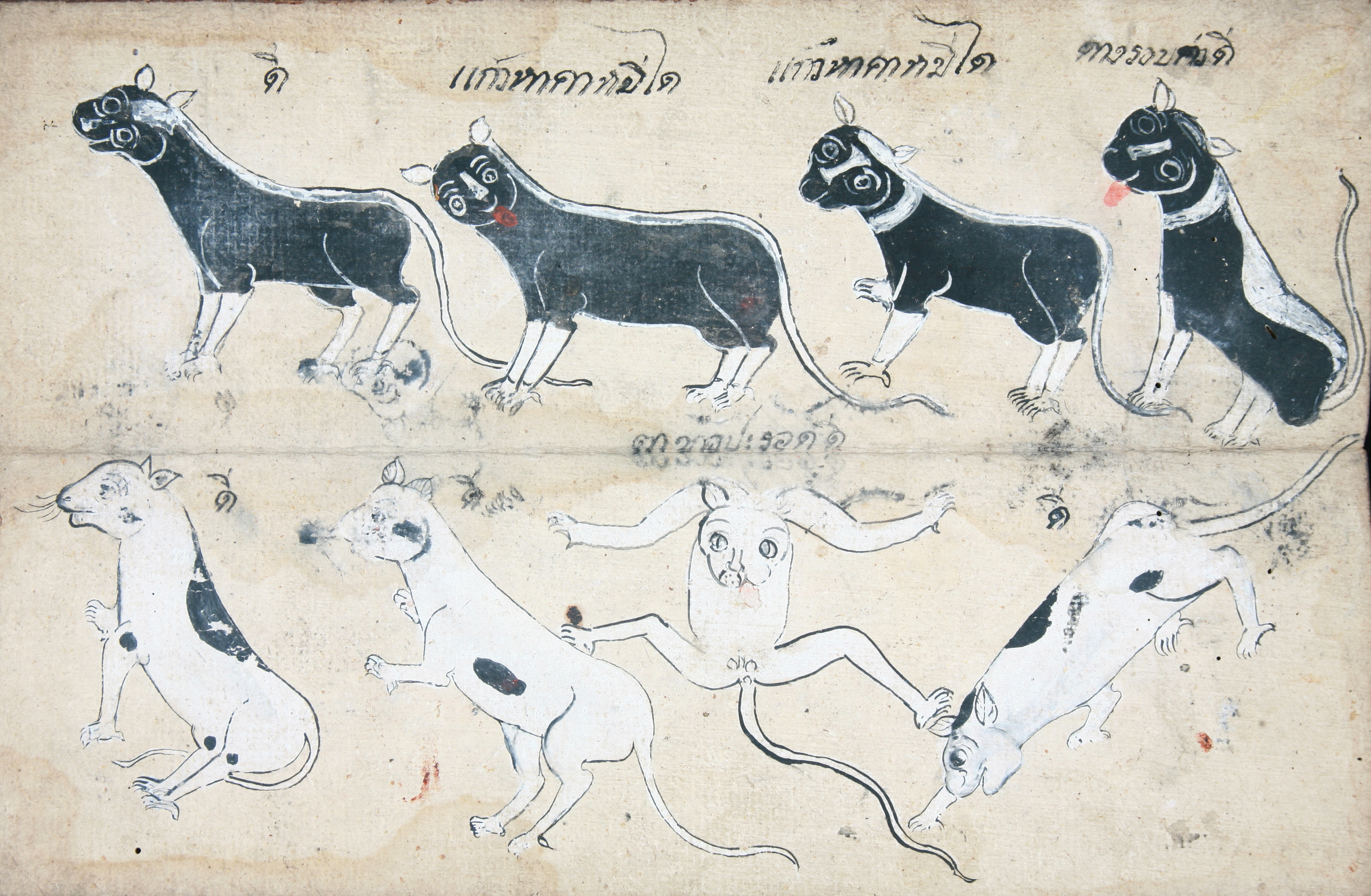
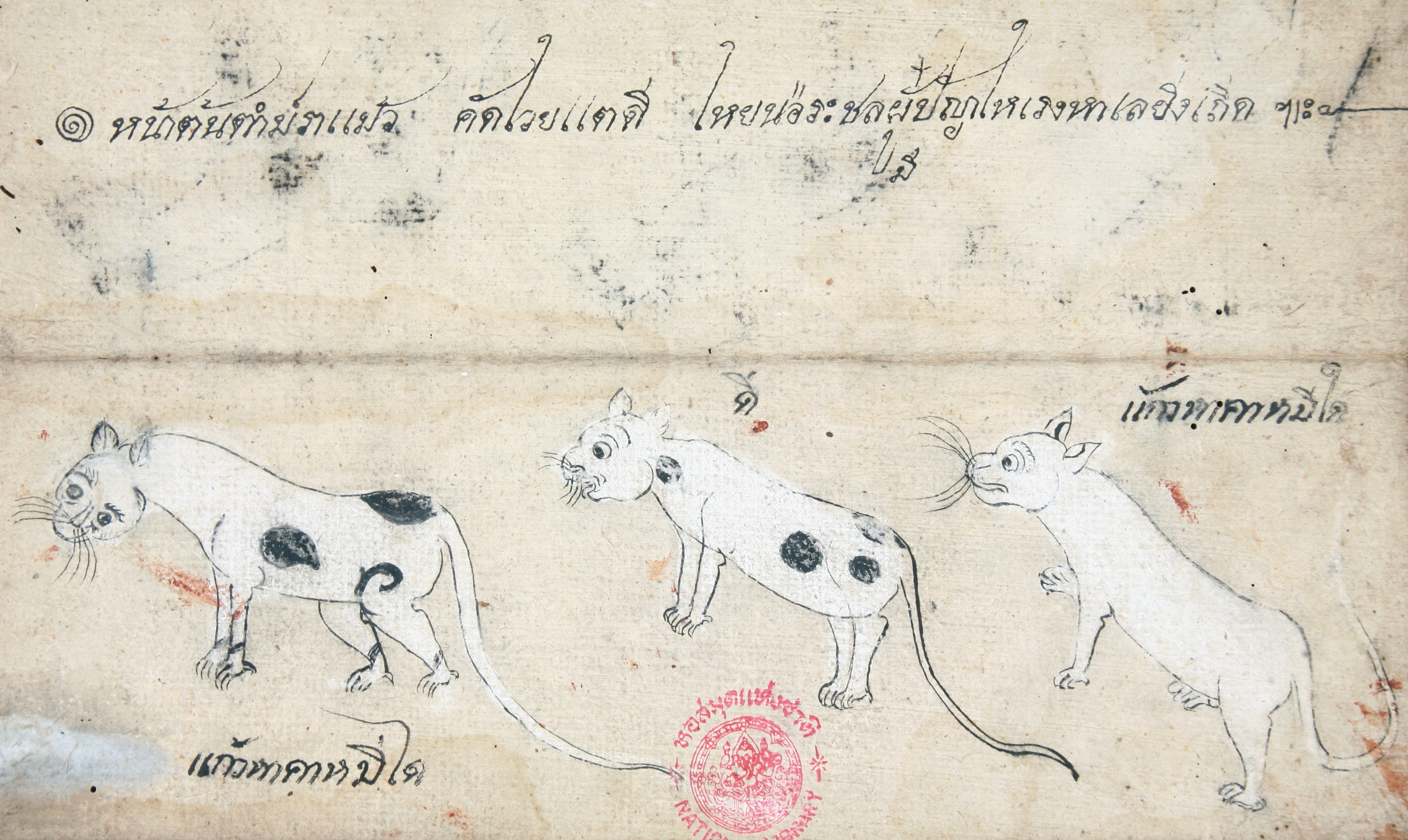
Khao Manee cat or Khao plort in the Tamra Maew of Wat Arun (the Cat-Book Poems) thought to originate from the Thonburi kingdom - Rattanakosin Kingdom (AD 1768 to 1910). Over a dozen are now kept in the National Library of Thailand.

The Khao Manee is an ancient cat breed comparable to the Siamese, Thai, Korat, Suphalak, and other natural cat breeds from Thailand. The Khao Manee is mentioned in the Tamra Maew (Cat Book Poems) that also mention the Siamese cat breed and other different coat coloured cats endemic to Thailand, or Siam, as it was previously known.

=== Ayutthaya Kingdom ===
In the Ayutthaya Kingdom (AD 1351–1767) there are many books about ancient Siam cats recording cats such as the Siamese/Thai, Korat, Suphalak, Konja, etc.. There are 23 species in Ayutthaya. 17 species were fed at the Ayutthaya royal palace, but there are no records about the Khao Manee. There are a few records about white cats, but no specific records about the Khao Manee. Only 23 species have been recorded.

=== Thonburi Kingdom ===
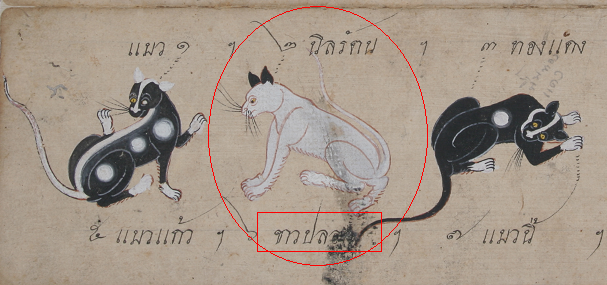
Erroneous information in the research. There is a Khao Manee (white cat). But the picture is incorrect; this is a Mulila cat.

After the Ayutthaya Kingdom collapsed during the Burmese-Siamese War (AD 1765–67), the Siamese people emigrated to the Thonburi Kingdom (AD 1768–1782). One of the most important temples in Bangkok is in the Wat Arun. A Buddhist temple had existed at the site of Wat Arun since the time of the Ayutthaya Kingdom. When King Taksin established his new capital of Thonburi near the temple after the fall of Ayutthaya, the Khao Manee's historical records were found there.

=== Rattanakosin Kingdom (Bangkok) ===
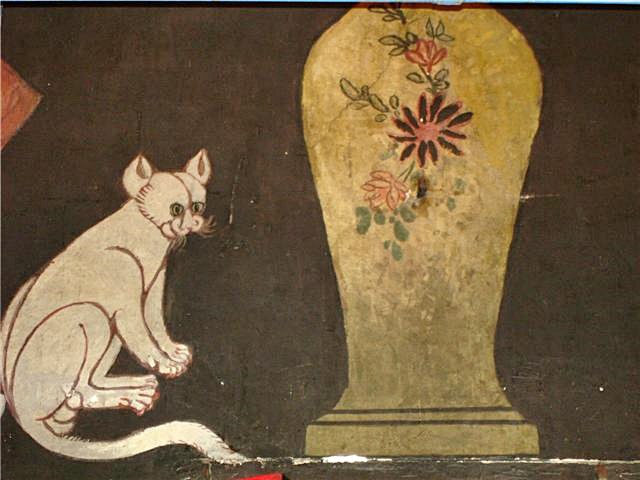
Khao Manee Mural Painting in Wat Thong Noppakhun, Bangkok. Created in the reign of King Rama 1-3 (AD 1782 to 1851).

In the reign of King Nangklao (AD 1824–1851), the Khao Manee is more frequently mentioned. Khao Manee cats are famed and there have been paintings found of them at temples. The white cat was originally known as the ‘Khao Plort’, then became known as the Khao Manee in the reign of King Chulalongkorn (1868-1910 AD).

=== Introduction worldwide ===
The Khao Manee was said to be kept and bred initially by Siam royals, as was the case with other rare coloured cats such as the Siamese. Breeders in Thailand are promoting and breeding the Khao Manee in the effort of preserving its lineage and breed standard. The first Khao Manee cat imported to the United States arrived in 1999 when Colleen Freymuth imported 12 Khao Manees. In 2004, she was joined by Frédéric Lachaud-Goedert in France who began another breeding program. With the help of Janet Poulsen, an edifying contributor to the establishment of the breed, they worked to have the breed recognised in all the world's cat registries.

In Poland, Aneta Olszewska and her daughter Weronika founded DiamondEyes Cattery, the country’s only officially registered Khao Manee cattery. They are the only cattery in the world to have three World Champions in the breed, and they were the first in WCF to achieve this recognition with the Khao Manee. Their cats have earned some of the highest distinctions in the breed worldwide, winning international titles across Europe.

Breeders in the West are still working to promote and establish foundation lines for the Khao Manee.

The Thai breeders used to breed only white to white Khao Manees. This is the most distinctive trait of the breed. While most western breeders perpetuate this heritage by screening their genetic informations, other breeders prefer to cross their subjects with coloured Asian breeds of cats.

== Breed registration ==
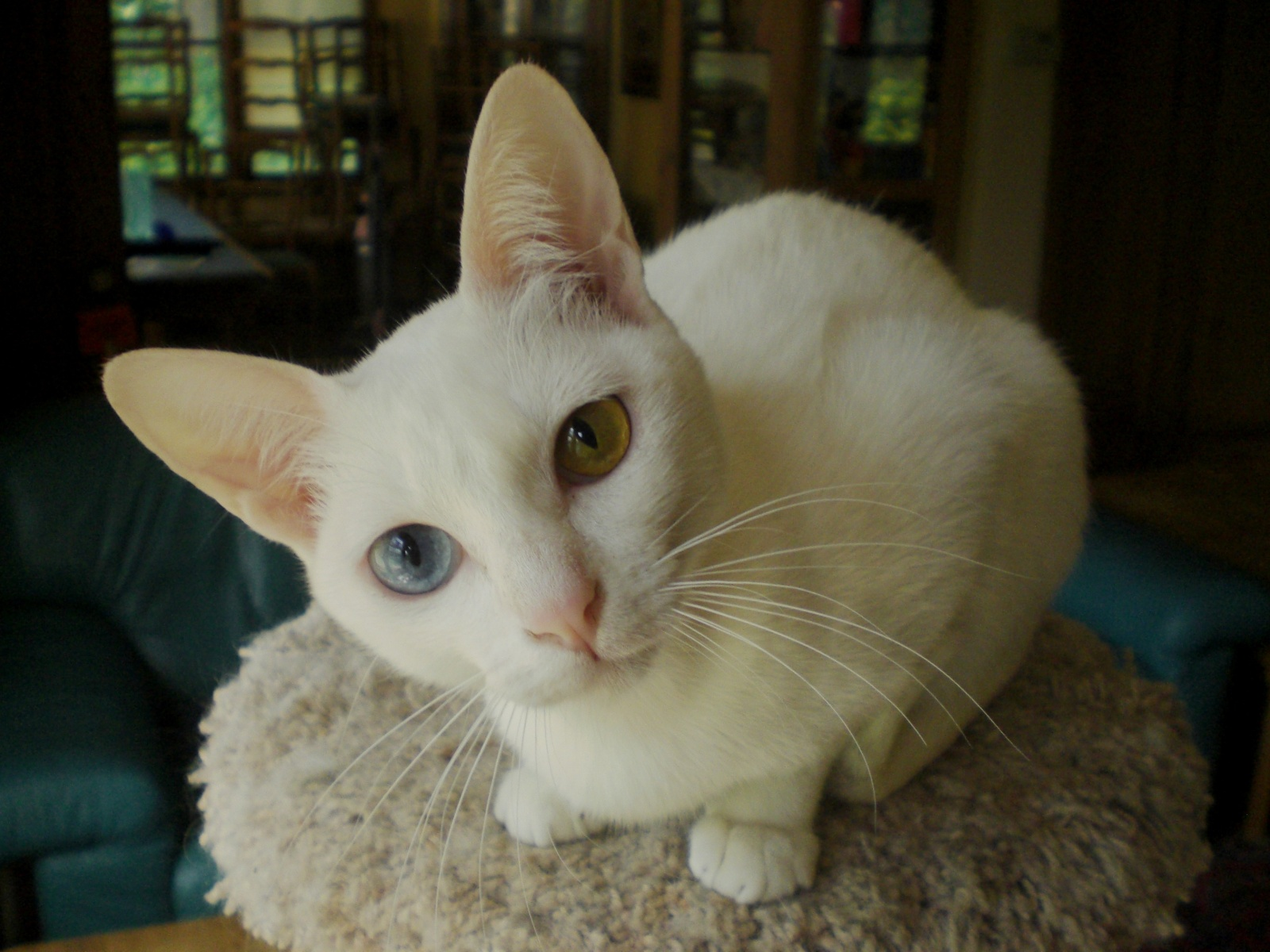
Odd-eyed Khao Manee

=== Registries ===
Although the breed is well known in its native land, it has only recently been adopted by Western cat breeders, gaining "registration only" status from TICA in May 2009. On 3 September 2011, the breed was promoted to "Preliminary New Breed", effective from 1 May 2012 and on 30 August 2013 the breed was promoted to "Advanced New Breed", effective immediately. On 24 January 2015, the Khao Manee breed was advanced to Championship level in TICA, effective 1 May 2015.

On 8 September 2010, at the meeting of the GCCF Executive Committee, the Khao Manee was granted breed name in GCCF, and was approved for exhibition only. The Khao Manee Cat Club was granted GCCF pre-affiliation at the Council meeting on 26 October 2011.

The breed received official recognition by the CFA on 7 February 2018, and has been welcome in their shows since 1 May 2018.

The breed is also accepted in other registries, such as WCF, however it is not recognised by FIFe.

=== Popularity ===
Khao Manee cats are one of the rarest feline breeds in the world, therefore the prices are relatively high, in some cases reaching up to US$11,000. In its country of origin, the Khao Manee is very popular because it is associated with the monarchy but also because several legends of extreme felicity and healing were reported by the press. Known as the "White Gem", the Khao Manee was rumoured to be highly coveted by Thai royalty, and is thought to bring good luck to those fortunate enough to have one. It's always in relation with religious discovery and about sudden fortune. Some stories mention sums going up to 150 billion Baht (over US$4 billion) in 1993 for a subject with eyes like precious stones which funded the construction of a monastery.

=== Distinction ===
The Khao Manee is not to be confused with the Siamese or Thai, or any Siamese relative including the Foreign White, which was bred from purebred Siamese with one white-coated British Shorthair ancestor. Though both white cats have a common background, the Siamese cat and the Khao Manee have different genetic structures, bloodlines and breeding policies, thus Khao Manee are considered a completely different breed in the West, as well as in its native home of Thailand.

== Characteristics ==
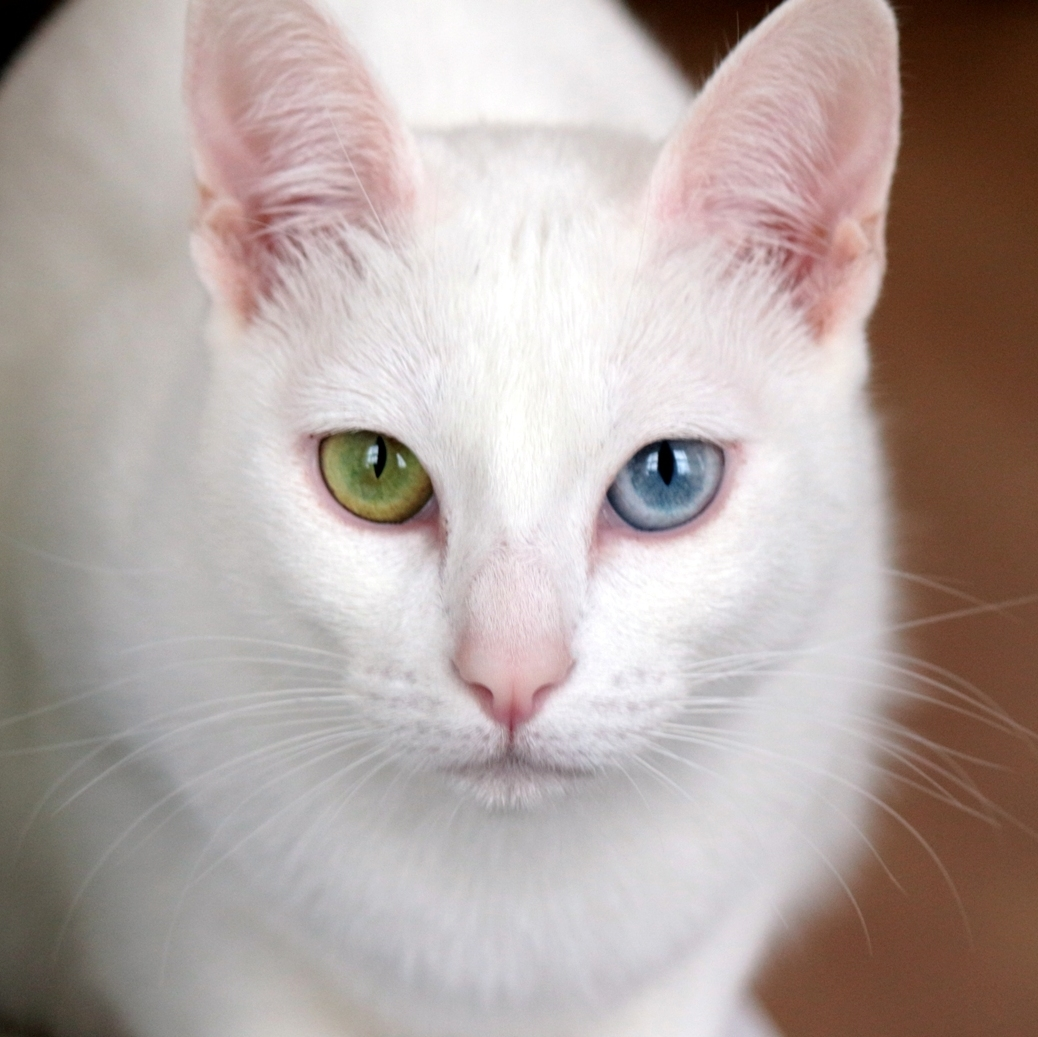
Odd-eyed Khao Manee

=== Appearance ===
==== Body ====
Khao Manee cats are pure solid-white with a short, smooth, close-lying coat without undercoat. The paw pads and the nose leather are pink. They are muscular, athletic cats of moderate build and are reputed to be active, communicative and intelligent.

==== Eyes ====
The eye colour is brilliant, clear and vivid, and should resemble that of precious gemstones. They can have blue (including aqua), golden (including shades of brown, copper, amber, yellow, and hazel), or green eyes. Furthermore, odd-eyes are allowed; with one of each colour or multiple colours within one eye. The odd-eyed Khao Manee is the rarest variety.

== See also ==
- Thai cat
- Siamese cat
- Suphalak cat
- Korat cat
- Burmese cat
- Tonkinese cat
