= Thai cat =

Breed of cat

Thai
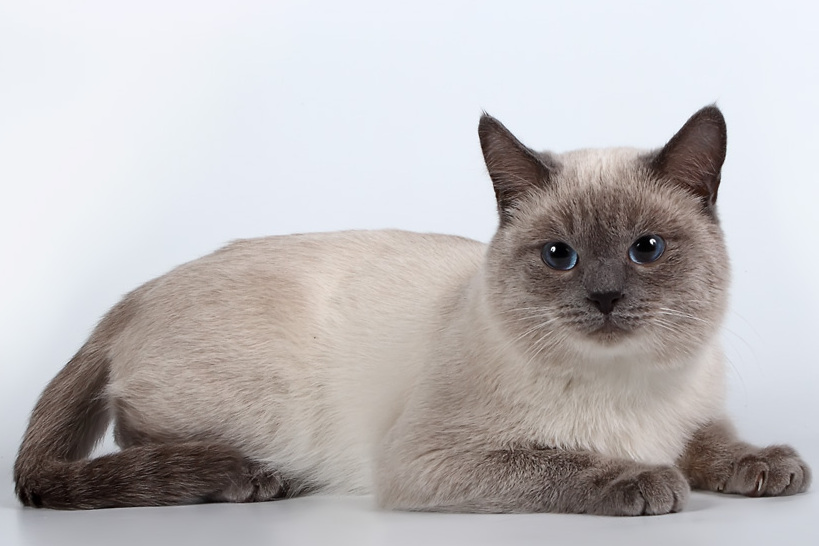
- Blue point Thai
- Other names: Standardised breed: Old-Style Siamese, Wichien Maat
- Common nicknames: Applehead, Classic Siamese, Traditional Siamese
- Origin: Thailand (originally); Europe and North America (redevelopment)
- Foundation bloodstock: Western Siamese, backcrossed with indigenous wichienmaat

Breed standards
- FIFe: standard
- TICA: standard
- WCF: standard
- FFE: standard

The Thai or Wichien Maat (Thai: วิเชียรมาศ, [wí.tɕʰīan.mâːt], RTGS: wichianmat, meaning 'diamond gold') is a breed of domestic cat re-established from the 1980s onward after its split off from the Western, modern-style Siamese cat. This natural breed is descended from the cats of Thailand, and, among various groups of breeders in different times and places, has also been called the Old-Style Siamese, Traditional Siamese, Classic Siamese; Wichien Maat (anglicised from the Thai name); and the Applehead, a nickname that originated in the 1950s (originally as a pejorative used by breeders of the modern-style, more extreme-featured Siamese). According to The International Cat Association: "The Thai is the breed dedicated to preserving the native pointed cat of Thailand in as close to its original form as possible."

Compared to the modern-style, more extreme-featured Siamese, the traditional Thai breed (and native wichienmaat specimens) have a much more moderate appearance.

== History ==
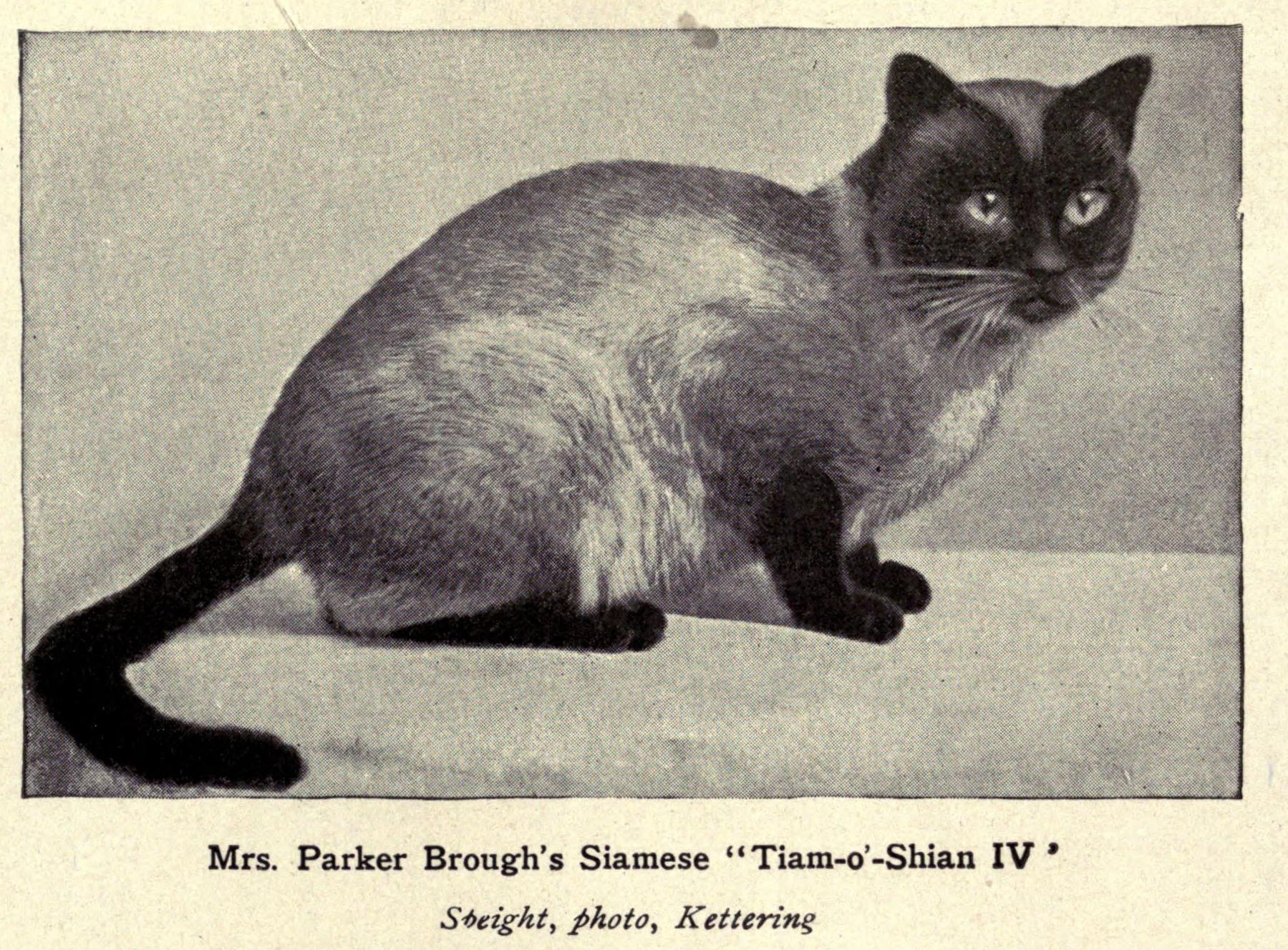
Siamese from the early 1900s

Cats that were imported from Siam (today, Thailand) to Western countries in the 19th and early 20th centuries were more moderate in conformation than the modern Western Siamese. While the Thai has common ancestry with the Western Siamese, separate breeding, beginning after World War II, led to the development of two distinct breeds, with more extreme features dominating the cat show circuit and becoming the dominant variety of Siamese in the West. Starting in the 1980s, various breed clubs in both North America and Europe appeared that were dedicated to preserving the type that represents the early 20th-century Siamese and is still found in Thailand. The World Cat Federation (WCF) recognized the original style as a separate breed, Thai, with full championship competitive status, in 1990.

In the United Kingdom and North America, the cats continued to be registered as Siamese. In 1999, in North America, the independent club PREOSSIA coined the name Old-Style Siamese to refer specifically to the moderate, original type of registered Siamese. In 2000, the Old-style Siamese Club, or OSSC, was formed in the UK. It was originally called The Classic Siamese Club but changed the name after someone in the USA claimed to have copyright over the name.

Native pointed cats were imported directly from Thailand, beginning in 2001, to refresh the gene pool of the Western, pedigreed Thai breeding programmes and ensure that the traits of the indigenous Southeast Asian cats are preserved and distinct in these bloodlines.

Beginning in 2007, members of PREOSSIA began the new breed application process in The International Cat Association (TICA). It was necessary to request separate breed status from the Siamese to permit the Old-Style Siamese to be bred and shown using different registration rules and a different breed standard. However, TICA refused to allow the name Old-Style Siamese for the "new" breed, and breeders decided to follow the example of the Europeans and use the name Thai. In January 2010, the Thai was granted Championship status in TICA, enabling it to compete for top honours along with the other breeds of pedigreed cats. Although by this time, the Thai had been recognized by WCF for 20 years, one major European registry still had not recognised the breed. At last, in 2015, Fédération Internationale Féline (FIFe) accepted the Thai in its "Preliminary Recognized Breeds" class.

Long before its re-branding as the Thai, the old type of Siamese was part of the foundation stock of a variety of new 20th-century breeds, such as the Himalayan, Ocicat, and Havana Brown. Near the end of the 20th century, modern Siamese were used more frequently for this purpose, as in the case of the Cornish Rex and Peterbald.

== Description ==
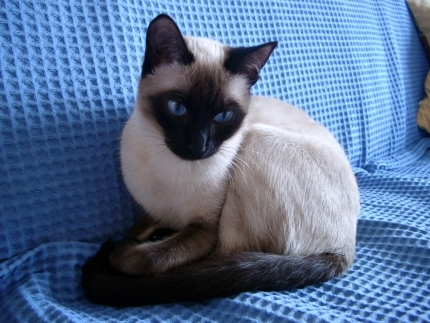
Seal point Thai cat

As breeds, the Thai and the modern Siamese share common ancestry, the point colouration gene, and the outgoing, people-loving, vocal personality made famous in the West by the early 20th century imports. They differ only in "type," meaning the conformation of body and head.

The primary features of the Thai are that it is a "pointed" cat (blue eyes, dark extremities, pale body) of foreign body type (more elongated than the average Western domestic cat, but noticeably less so than the modern Siamese or Oriental); has a modified wedge-shaped head; a long flat forehead; a nose with no more than a slight concave curve at eye level; has a short, flat-lying single coat; does not carry the longhair gene; and it usually has a registered pedigree dating back to the late 19th century Siamese, with no Western domestic shorthair ancestors. In TICA, unregistered cats with import documentation proving origin in Thailand are also permitted to register as Thais—and Thailand imports have all the same breeding and show privileges that Western-bred Thais have. To permit British Thai breeders (isolated by still restrictive British rabies quarantine laws) to work with GCCF Old-Style Siamese, TICA also allows outcrossing to registered Siamese of moderate type. In WCF and FIFe, natural, unregistered cats born in Thailand are not allowed to register as Thais or be used as outcrosses. Outcrossing to the Siamese is also prohibited. However, when the Thai breed was new to WCF, there was a temporary period during which unregistered pointed European cats were allowed to register as Thais and outcrossing to other Western breeds was allowed.

While the foundation and concept of the Thai vary somewhat from one country's registry to the next, all define the Thai as a breed that preserves the characteristics of early Western Siamese. TICA uniquely defines the Thai as preserving the native, natural pointed cats of Thailand as well as the earliest Western Siamese. The goal of Thai breeders is always to preserve the old look, provide plenty of genetic diversity for a healthy future, and guarantee the authenticity and personality of the old type of Siamese.

Traditional-style Thai cats vs. modern-style Siamese cats

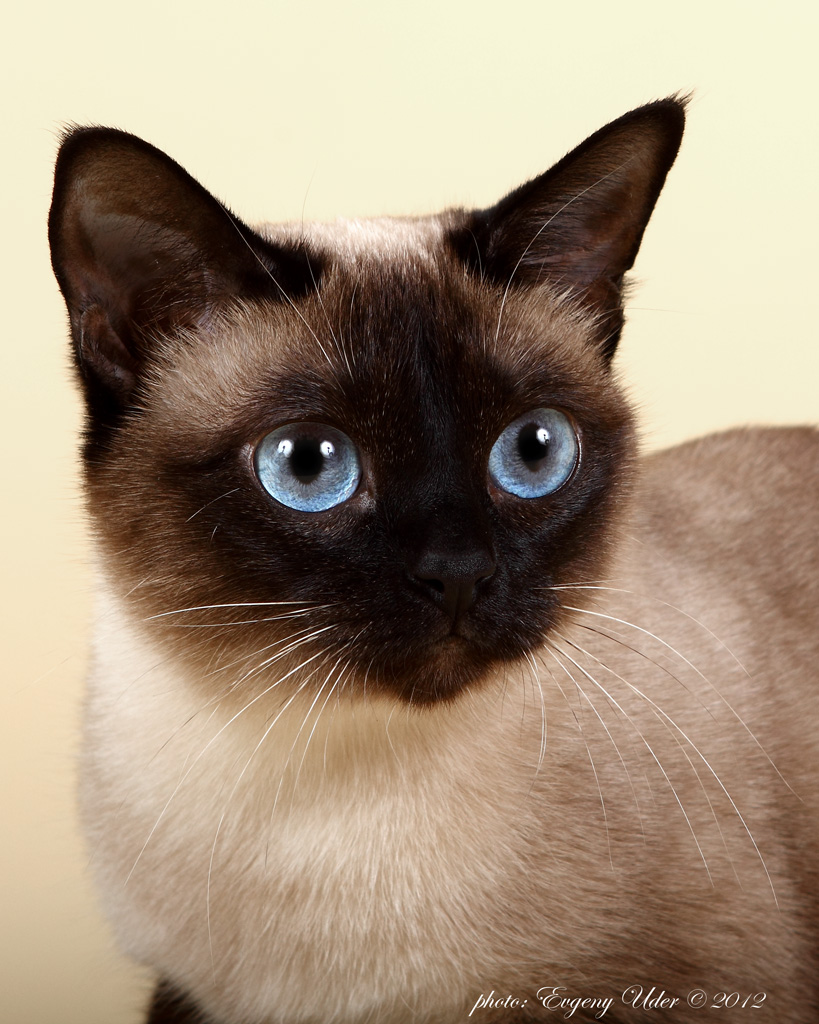
Traditional round "applehead" Thai cat

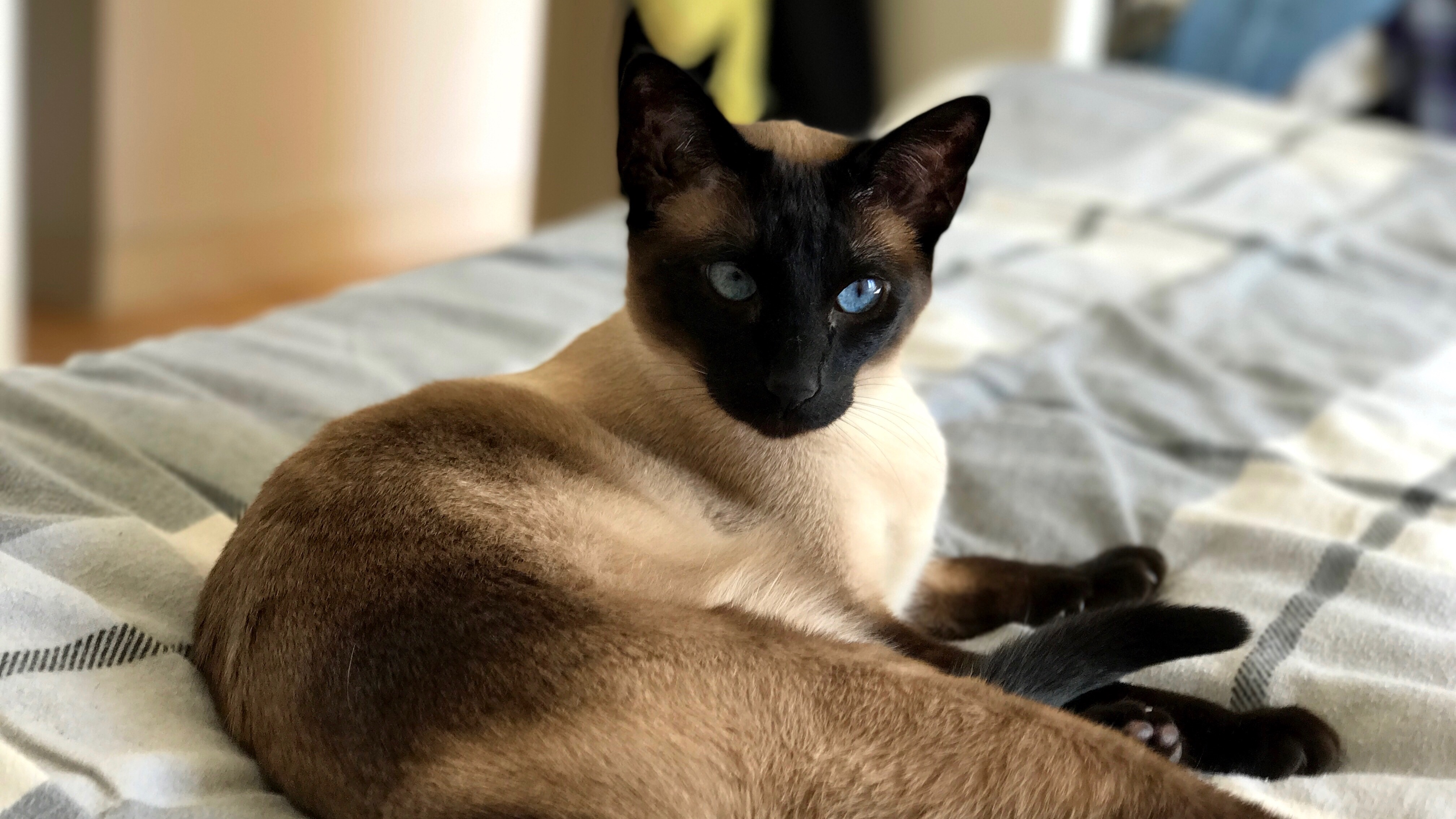
Traditional seal point Thai cat

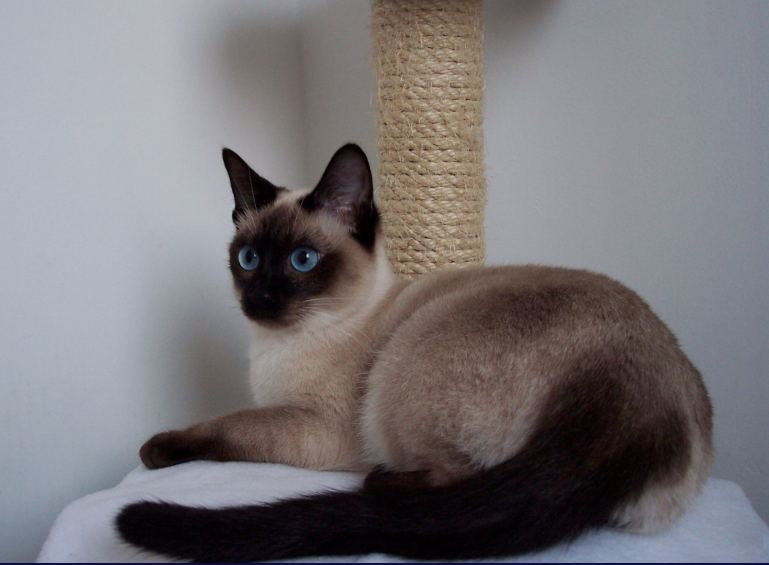
Traditional seal point Thai cat with a round applehead and a bulky-build body

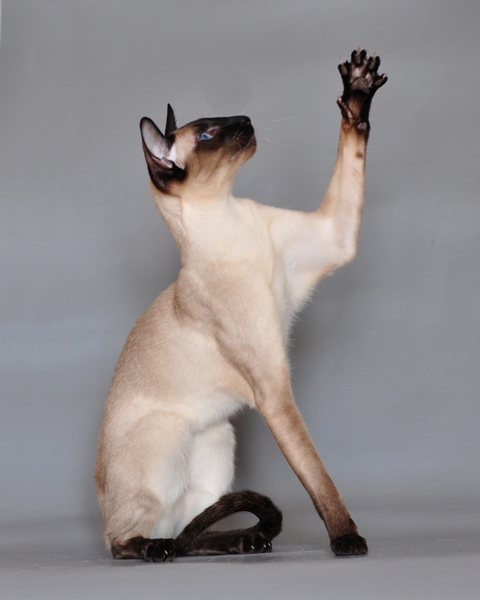
Modern seal point Siamese cat (side view) with a slim "wedgehead" and a slender-build body

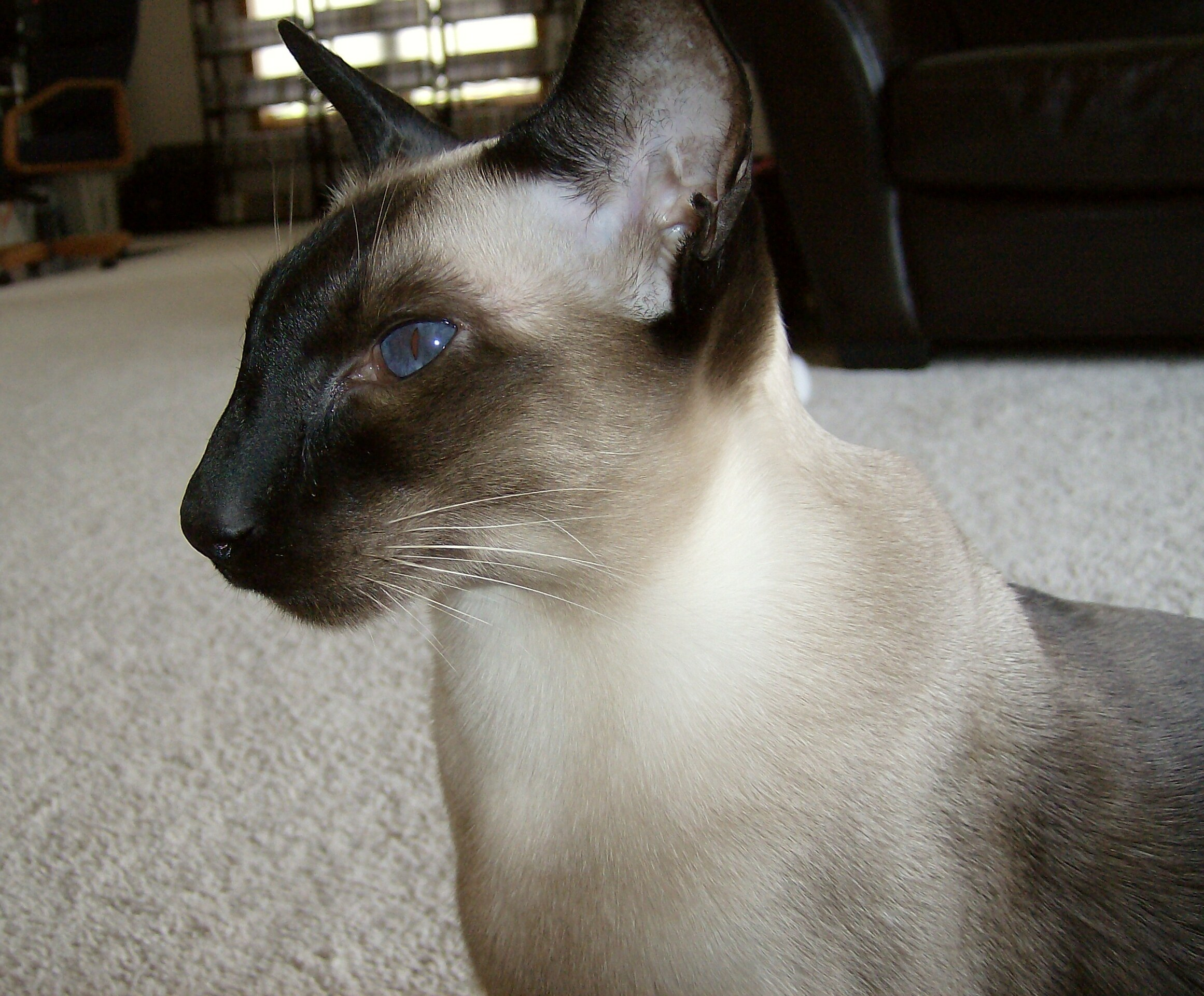
Modern "wedgehead" seal point Siamese cat

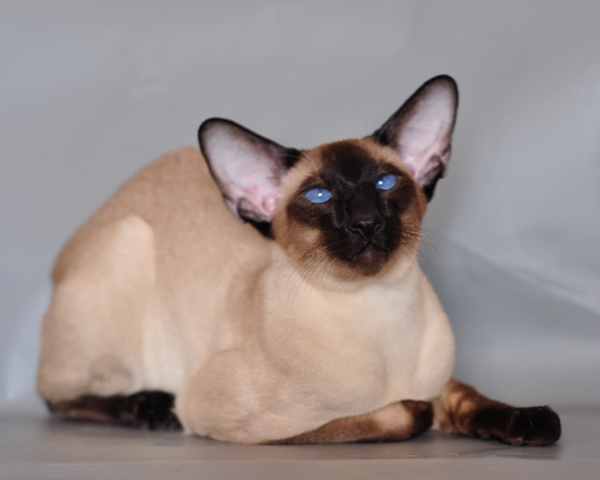
Modern seal point Siamese cat (front view) with extremely large, wide-set ears

== Background ==
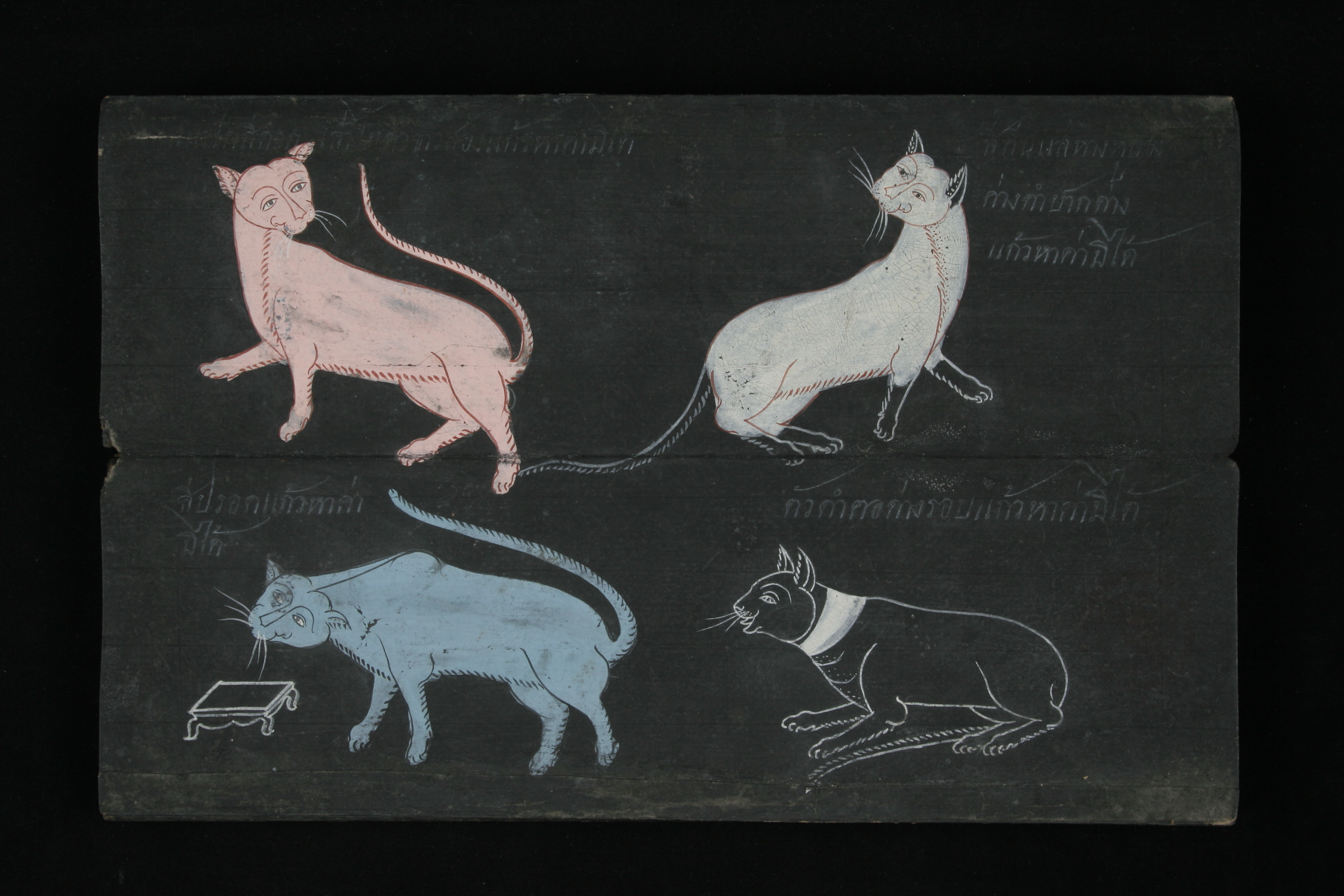
Suphalak cat, Wichien Maat cat, Korat cat and Ninlachak cat in Tamra Maew (The Cat-Book Poems) thought to originate from the Ayutthaya Kingdom (1351 to 1767 AD). Over a dozen are now kept in the National Library of Thailand.

In Thailand, the ancestor of this elegant cat is known as the wichienmaat which means "moon diamond". The wichienmaat, along with other cats, was named, described and illustrated centuries ago in the "Tamra Maew" book of cat poems. Over the years, the wichienmaat has stayed true to its original breeding, which is still seen today in Thailand where it remains a popular cat.

Starting in the late 1800s, the wichienmaat was first imported to the West by British cat breeders, and the cats became known as "Siamese," after the name of the country Siam (today Thailand). Cat fanciers were impressed with the graceful, "marten-faced" cats so very different from the cobby, rounder native breeds and longhairs. Western breeders wanted to emphasize and augment the qualities that made the cats so different and through selective breeding, they developed an increasingly elongated, angular, finer-boned type of Siamese. This "modern" or "show-style" type of Siamese dominated the show halls by the latter half of the 20th century. As the new look became prevalent, some breeders in England, Europe, and North America decided to buck the trend and instead preserve the look of the old type of Siamese. These breeders tend to work with a variety of different registries, but they have long exchanged breeding stock; while some call their cats Old-Style Siamese, others call them Thais.

== See also ==
- Birman cat
- Siamese cat
- Korat cat
- Burmese cat
- Tonkinese cat
- Khao Manee cat
- Suphalak cat
- Thai Lilac cat
