= Tonkinese =

Tonkinese may refer to:

- The language or people of Tonkin
- The Tonkinese cat breed
