= Suphalak =

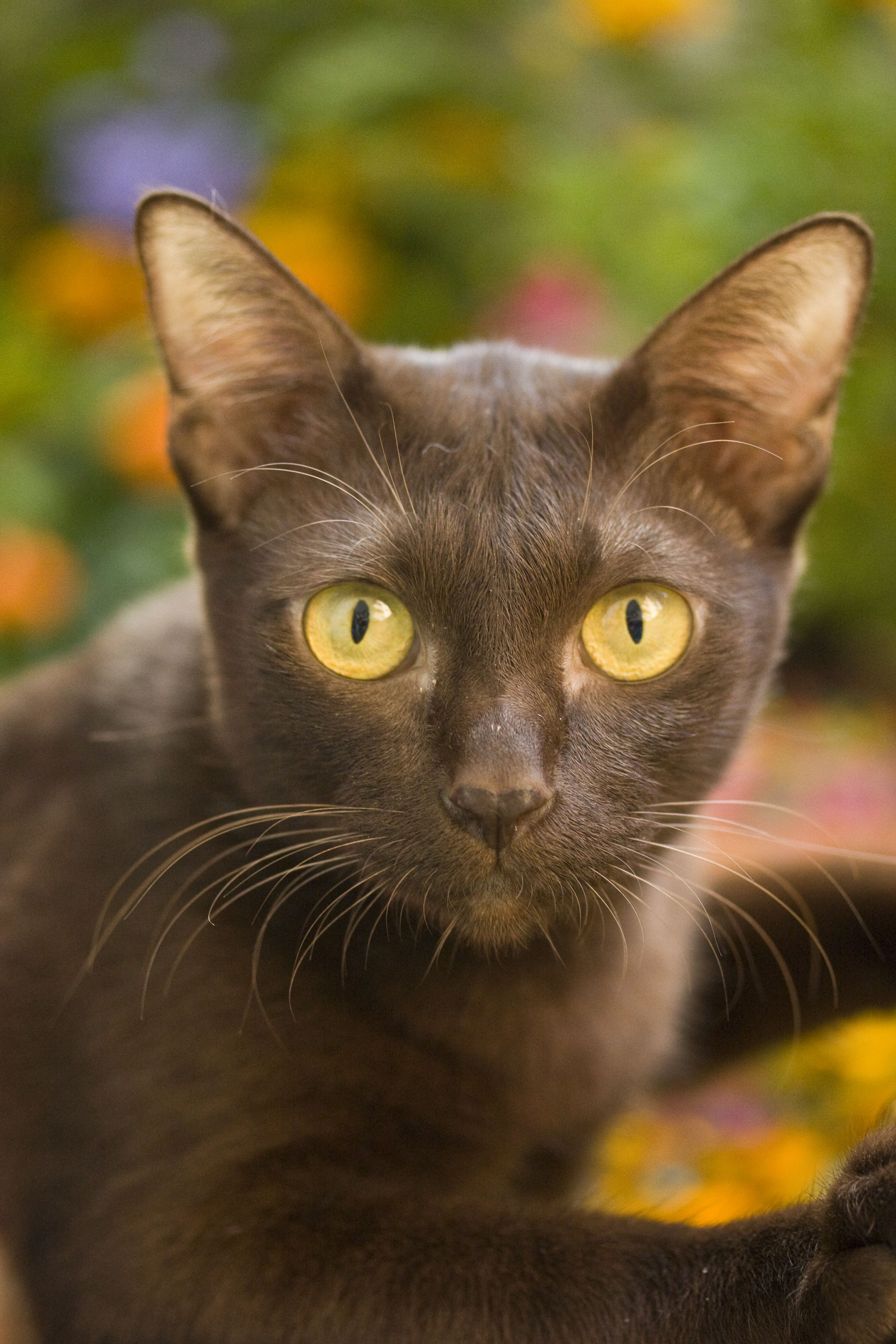
- Suphalak female in Thailand
- Other names: Thong Daeng
- Origin: Thailand

Breed standards
- WCF: standard
- Other: http://www.timba.org/suphalak.html

Notes
- The Suphalak is distinct from the Havana Brown. The Suphalak is a natural breed of pure Thai origin and out-crosses with non-Thai cats are not allowed. The Havana Brown is an established breed created by crossing Siamese and European black cats and has a different standard.

The Suphalak (Thai: ศุภลักษณ์, RTGS: Supphalak) or Thong Daeng (ทองแดง 'copper') is a cat variety originating in Thailand. It is of a solid reddish-brown copper colored short-haired coat, and was described in a class of historical Thai manuscripts known as the Treatise on Cats or Tamra Maew. It is often considered an ancestor of the modern Burmese breed or a synonym thereof; others recognize it as a color variety of the native Thai cat breed known as Maew Boran แมวโบราณ), while there have been efforts by The International Maew Boran Association (TIMBA) in Thailand to have the Suphalak certified as a separate breed.

According to TIMBA, the Suphalak is a natural breed and should not be confused with the sable Burmese cat, an established American and European created breed which expresses the colorpoint Burmese gene (cb) that results in a dark points on the extremities such as the ears, feet and tail as well as a dark mask on the face.

== History ==
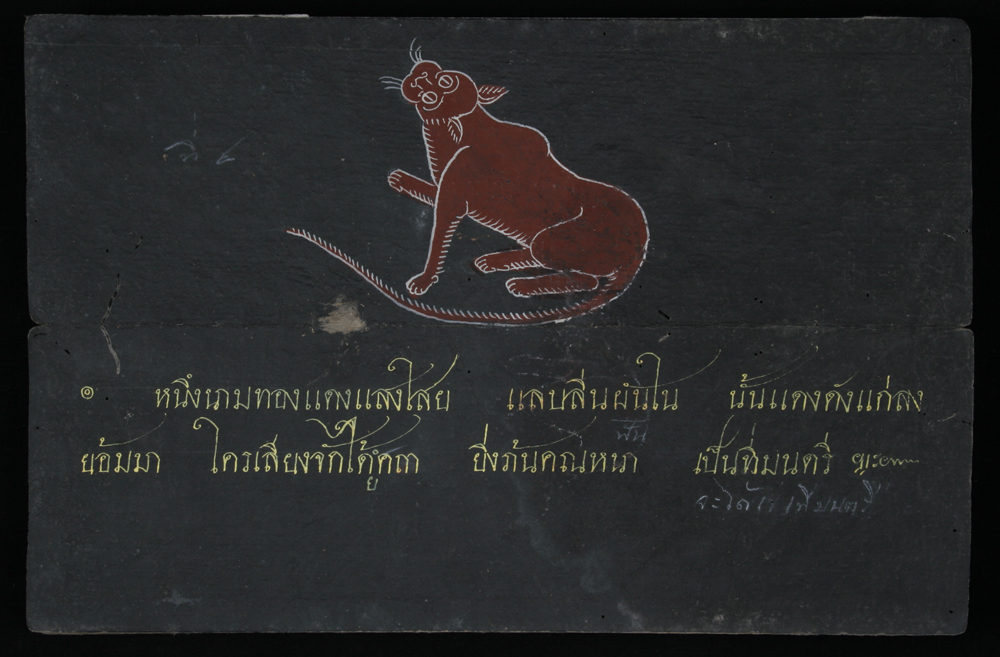
Suphalak cat in the Tamra Maew

Both a description and depiction of the Suphalak first appears in a collection of ancient manuscripts called the Tamra Maew (the Cat-Book Poems) thought to originate from the Ayutthaya Kingdom (AD 1351 to 1767). Over a dozen are now kept in the National Library of Thailand, while others have resurfaced outside of Thailand and are now in the British Library. and National Library of Australia. In addition to the Suphalak, the Tamra Maew also describes other heritage cats of Thailand, including the Wichien Maat (a seal point Siamese with pale blue eyes) and the Korat, which are still bred for preservation in Thailand today and have become popular in other countries.

When the capital city of Ayutthaya was sacked on 7 April 1767 at the end of the Burmese–Siamese War, the Burmese army burned everything in sight and returned to Burma taking Siamese noblemen and royal family members with them as captives. Buddha images were hacked apart for their gold, and all the royal treasures were stolen. Thai legend has it that the Burmese King Hsinbyushin found and read the poem for the Suphalak in the Tamra Maew. The poem describes the Suphalak as being as rare as gold, and anyone that owns this cat will become wealthy. He told his army to round up all the Suphalak cats and bring them back to Burma along with the other treasures. Today in Thailand this legend is told as a humorous explanation as to why the Suphalak is so rare.

The understanding of the name Suphalak, as well as other Thai cats, have continued to evolve in meaning. It has usually been regarded as an ancestor of the modern Burmese cat, and sometimes used as a Thai synonym for the breed, though there have been efforts, led by the Thailand-based TIMBA, to have Suphalak certified as a separate breed. Some breeders now regard all cats described in the Tamra Maew as phenotypic color varieties of the native Thai cat, now known as Maew Boran and registered as an experimental breed with The International Cat Association (TICA) by TIMBA.

== Modern breed development by TIMBA ==
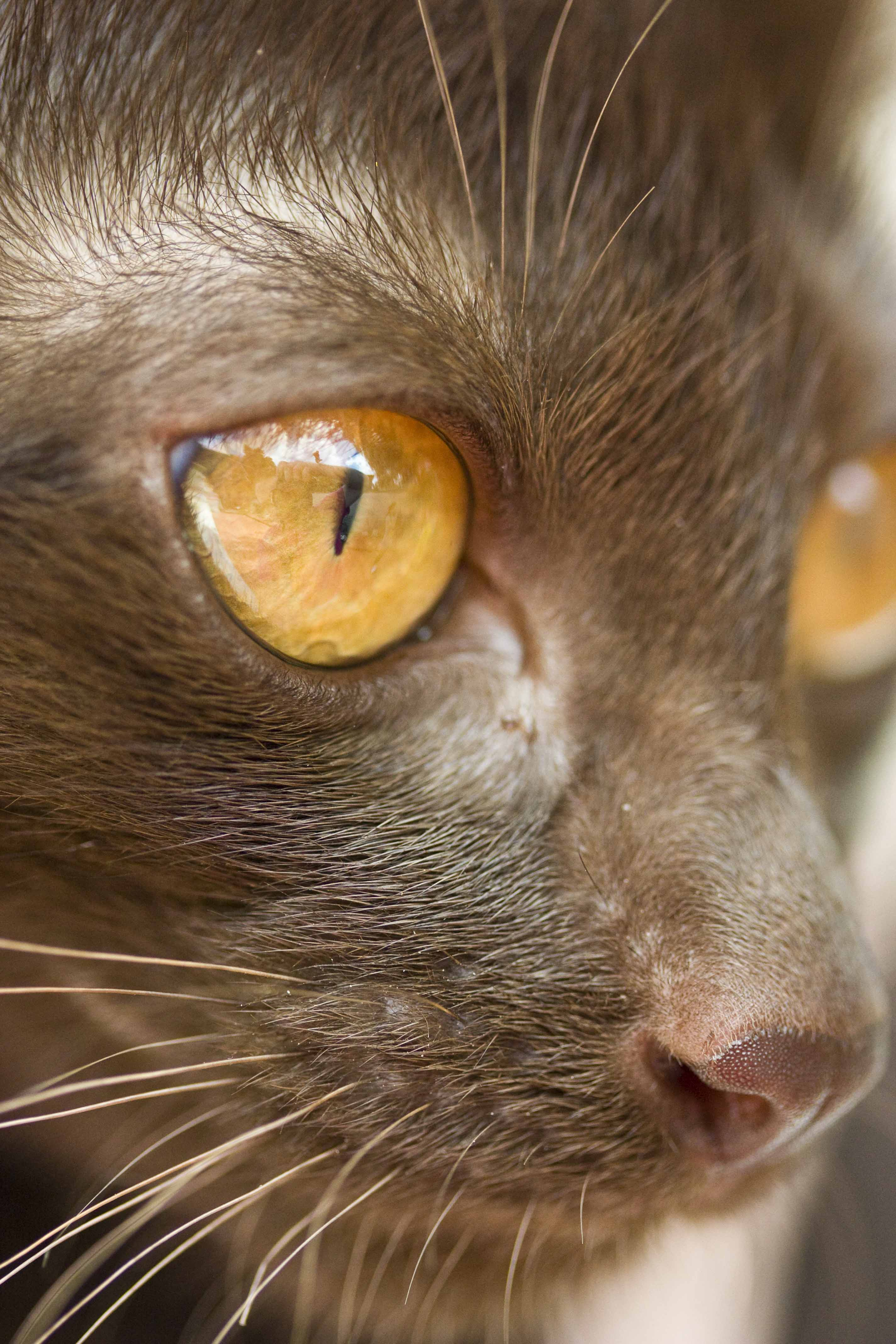
Suphalak eye, whisker and nose color

Throughout the past several decades, many breeders in Thailand have bred Thong Daeng (translated as 'copper') cats with dark points and considered them to be Suphalaks. They were entered into cat shows in Thailand and exhibited as Suphalaks. Noted authors such as Martin Clutterbuck assumed this was the case. As a result, there was much confusion, especially among Burmese breeders who mistakenly insisted that Suphalaks were a solid sable-colored Burmese cat of Thai origin. Experienced Thai breeder Kamnan Preecha Pukkabu disagreed with these breeders because the ancient poems describe a cat with the 'whole body copper' appearance and that would mean even the skin (down to the paw pads) needed to be reddish in color and not dark or black like a sable-colored Burmese cat. Using one proper Suphalak male, he tried to resurrect this lost breed of cat with the ideal features, but without success. This has been attributed to two major problems, the first being that the Suphalak is so rare that breeders have had great difficulty finding them. Genetically, the Suphalak is a chocolate self, expressing two recessive alleles for the brown color 'b' and the dominant 'C' allele (full color) giving the Suphalak its solid brown color. For two recessive alleles to randomly combine without human intervention, i.e., in a Thai temple or on the street, is rare. Secondly, the solid copper chocolate Suphalak was so scarce that few people had ever seen one and even if they did, they would not know that there was anything special about it, so there was no concerted effort to preserve these cats and they never entered a breeding program until recently.

Prior to 2013 there was only one Suphalak in a breeding program, a male named Samsen who lives at the Thai Cat Preservation Center in Ampawa, Thailand. Samsen belongs to Kamnan Preecha Pukkabut, a breeder renowned for his life effort to preserve the Thai cats described in the Tamra Maew. Despite Kamnan Preecha's best efforts to resurrect this lost breed, he has been unable to reproduce the Suphalak.

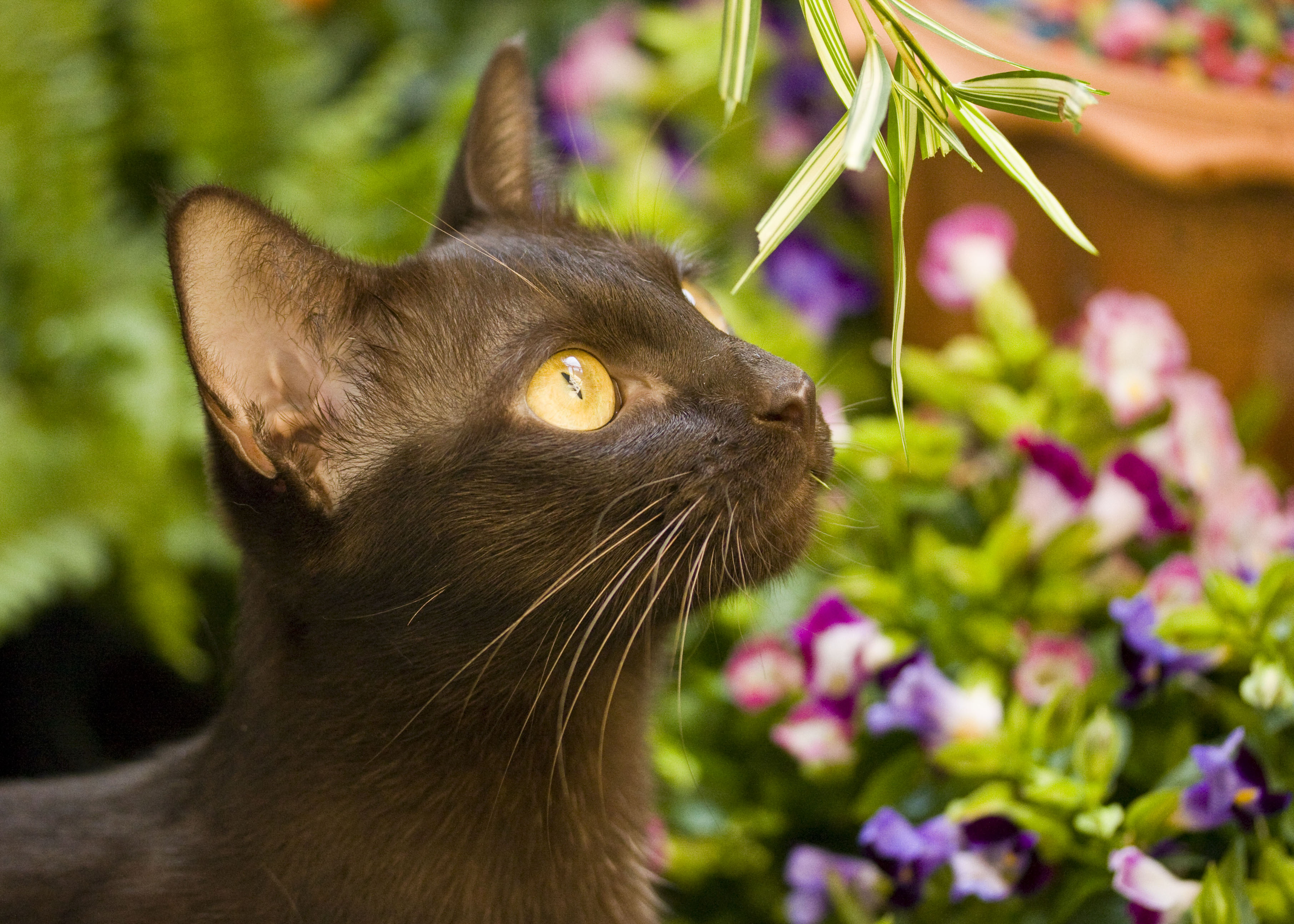
Suphalak female for breeding

In 2014 an association dedicated to the preservation of Thailand's heritage cats was established, The International Maew Boran Association (TIMBA) (Maew Boran translating to "Ancient Cat"). TIMBA focused its efforts on understanding the genetics responsible for the Suphalak and searching throughout Thailand for cats suitable for the Suphalak breeding program. Currently there are six foundation cats, one male and five females in active breeding programs, and all of them have all been genetically tested for their coat colors.

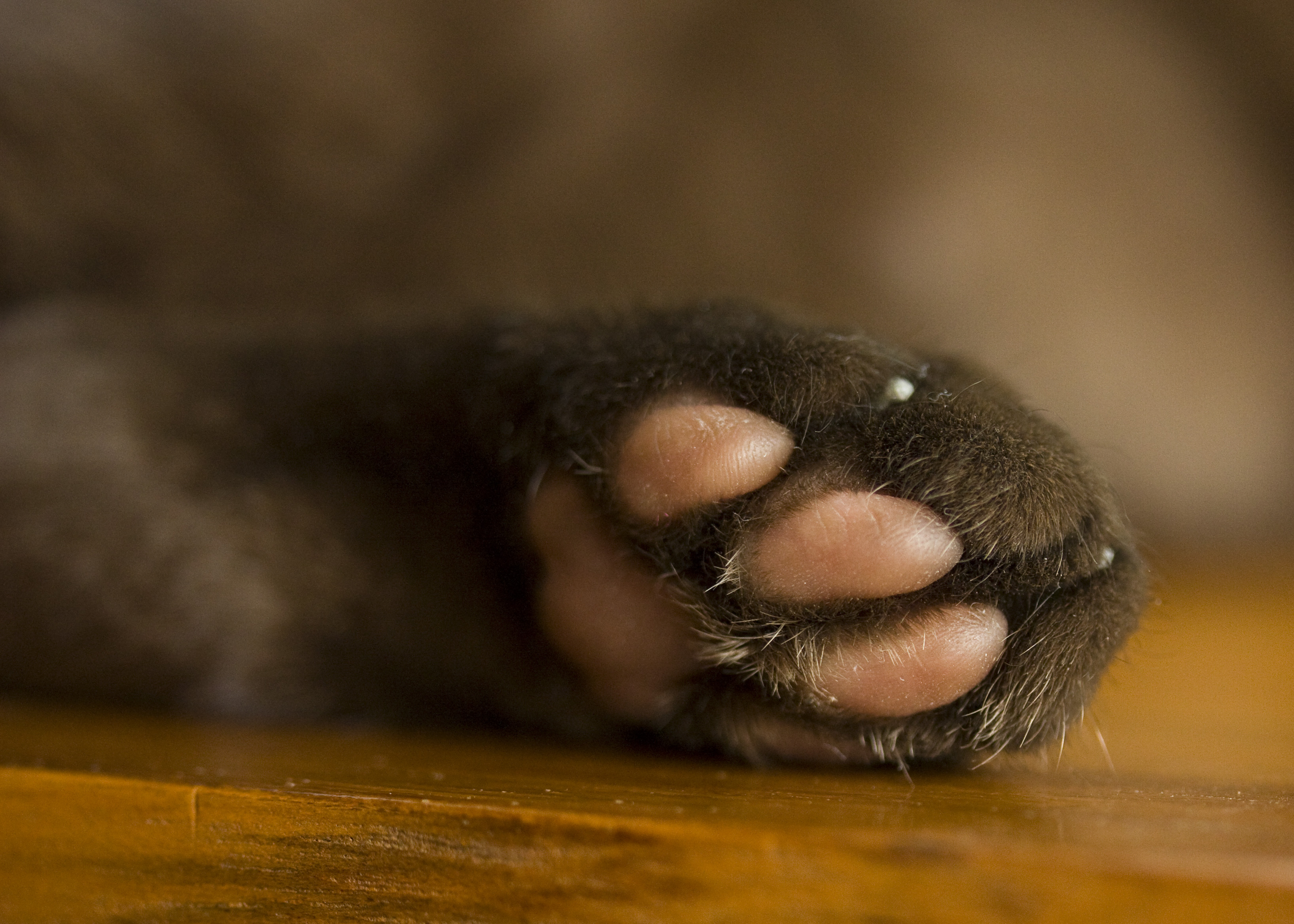
Suphalak paw pad color

To date, only one solid copper-chocolate Suphalak has been exported from Thailand. In May 2013, Kamnan Preecha declared one female (named 'Thonga') to be a proper Suphalak and suitable for breeding. In 2013, Thonga was shown and exhibited as a rare Suphalak at two different cat shows in Thailand, one being a large CFA, Royal Canin sponsored international show with judges from around the world. This was the first time a rare copper chocolate Suphalak had ever been entered in competition and presented to the public at any cat show. Later that year, Thonga was officially recorded as a Suphalak by the government export authorities of Thailand and imported by Lisa Young on September 29, 2013, to the United States where she remains in a breeding program at Thai Dee Maew Cattery in Waterford, Michigan. On September 6, 2015, Thonga became the first Suphalak ever registered as a Suphalak with an established cat registry, the American Cat Association (the oldest cat registry in America with their formal beginning in 1897). It was a milestone for the Suphalak, considering that so few are in existence. Due to the scarcity of Suphalaks in the world, ACA acceptable crosses are any cat of Thai origin including, but not limited to: Korats, Khao Manee, Konja or Siamese (shorthaired or longhaired). Thonga was mated with a traditional style Longhair Siamese, which resulted in two chocolate females. The first female had two white lockets, so could not be recorded as Suphalak as Suphalaks must have a whole body copper color and patches of white are not allowed for the breed. However, the second female born September 15, 2015, was solid copper chocolate and bright yellow eyes. She was the first Suphalak ever born outside of Thailand. Both Thonga and her older daughter have entered a breeding program where they are not only set to reproduce more Suphalaks, but also Tibetans and Traditional Orientals.

Suphalaks have made appearances at several cat shows in Thailand, including the first WCF Thailand National Show where the breed was exhibited and presented by the WCF Temporary General Secretary, Andreas Mobius.

== Appearance ==
The Suphalak's coat color should be a rich and even shade of warm brown throughout the body. The coat color is ideally more of a red-brown rather than a black-brown and does not show tabby markings. The Tamra Maew refers to this color as "thong daeng", or the color of copper. Breeders in Thailand today often compare the coat color to the pulp of the tamarind fruit pod, a common ingredient used in Thai cuisine.

The overall body and head type should be consistent with the native population of domestic cats found in Thailand. The body is medium-sized, muscular and semi-foreign in type. The head type is described as a modified wedge, medium width and moderate length. Neither the body nor head type should be extreme in any way.

The whiskers should be brown, complementing the coat color while the nose leather is a rosy-brown color. The paw pads should be light brown with a pink tone. The eye color is a bright yellow/gold color, described in the Tamra Maew as shining and sprinkling sun rays.

== Behavior ==
Like other cat breeds originating from Thailand, the Suphalak is notably people-oriented. They are intelligent, affectionate and playful, often taking on more of a dog-like personality and characteristics. They are communicative, active, playful and do not like to be left alone or ignored.

== Health issues ==
There are currently no known health issues with the Suphalak, as it is a newly developing breed. The Suphalak is, however, susceptible to common genetic diseases which are not breed-specific affecting all domestic cats.

== In popular culture ==
- The 2015 Thai film Cat a Wabb (แคท อ่ะ แว้บ! #แบบว่ารักอ่ะ), based on a Suphalak named Johnny the Suphalak Cat (จอนนี่แมวศุภลักษณ์) is about a famous cat on online social network.

== See also ==
- Siamese cat
- Thai cat
- Khao Manee
- Thai Lilac, Thai Blue Point and Thai Lilac Point
- Korat
