= Korat =

Breed of cat

Korat cat
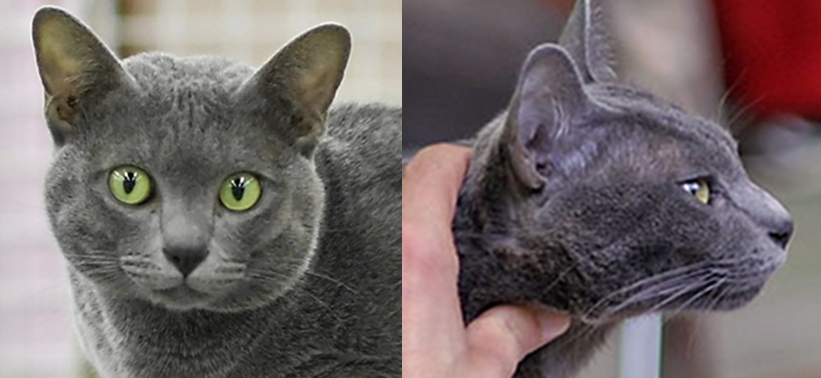
- Other names: Si sawat, Malet
- Origin: Thailand

Breed standards
- CFA: standard
- FIFe: standard
- TICA: standard
- ACF: standard
- ACFA/CAA: standard
- CCA-AFC: standard

The Korat cat (Thai: โคราช, มาเลศ, สีสวาด, RTGS: Khorat, Malet, Si sawat) is a silver-tipped blue-grey, short-haired breed of domestic cat with a small to medium build and a low percentage of body fat. Its body is semi-cobby, and unusually heavy for its size. It is an intelligent and playful active cat that forms strong bonds with people and is very vocal, with a sound different from other breeds. Among the Korat's distinguishing characteristics are its heart-shaped head, its large green eyes. Its front paws are shorter than the back paws.

The Korat is a natural breed, and one of the oldest stable cat breeds, and one of the very few that has not changed its appearance throughout centuries. Originating in Phimai, Thailand, it is named after its province of origin, Nakhon Ratchasima Province (typically called "Korat" by the Thai people). In Thailand, the breed is known as Si sawat, meaning "colour of the sawat seed". The Korat is known colloquially as the "good luck cat". Traditionally, they are given in pairs to newlyweds or people who are highly esteemed, for good luck. Until recently, Korats were not sold, but only given as gifts.

== History ==
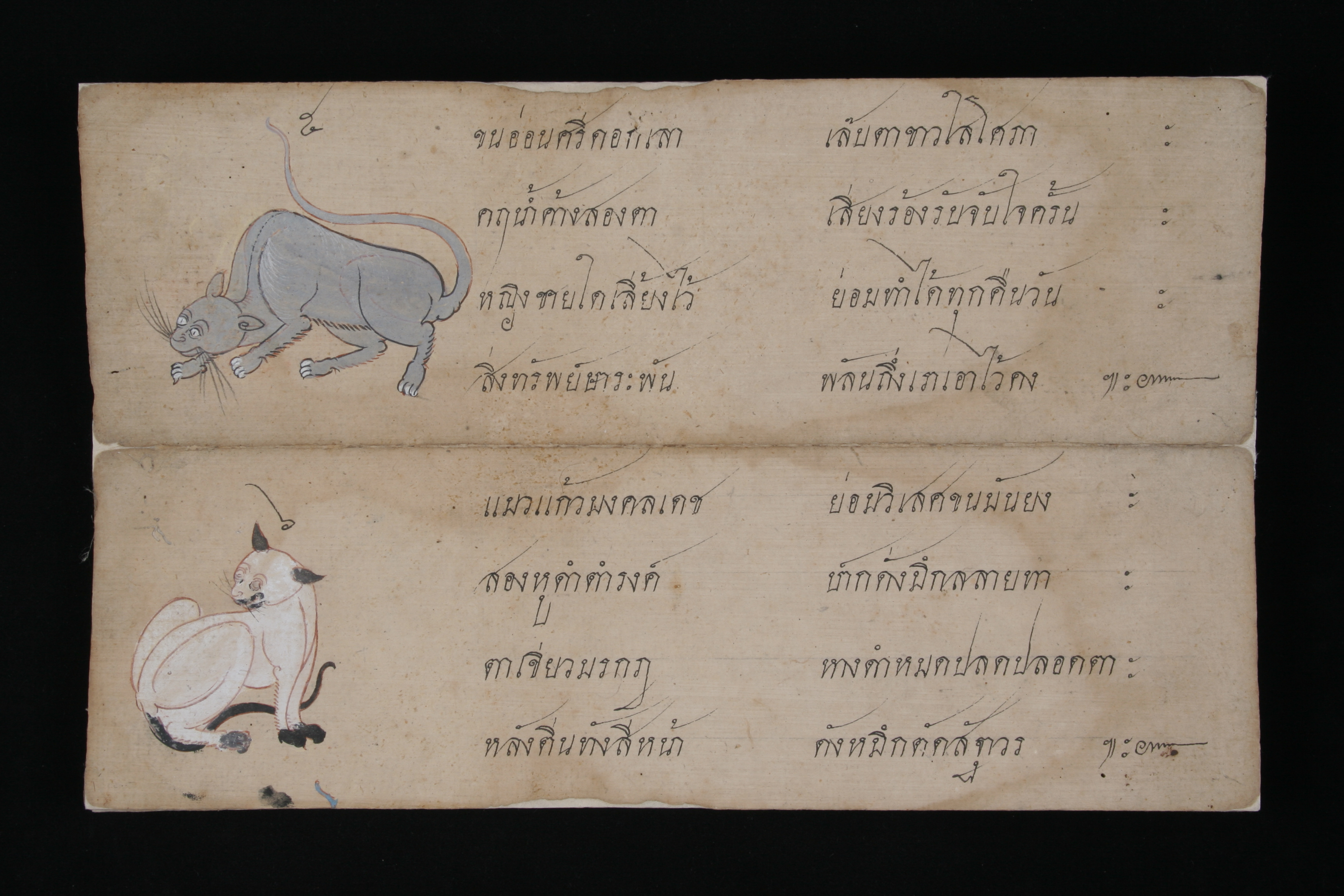
Korat cat and Siamese cat in Tamra Maew (The Cat-Book Poems) thought to originate from the Ayutthaya Kingdom (1351 to 1767 CE). Over a dozen are now kept in the National Library of Thailand.

The probable first allusion to the breed is in the Thai Tamra Maew (The Cat-Book Poems), authored between 1350 and 1767 CE and now in the National Library of Thailand. However, the illustration of the Korat in this book is not detailed enough to be definitive as to the breed portrayed. In recent years, the Korat was pictured on a postage stamp in Thailand. An example hangs in the city of Korat's post office.

Korats first appeared in Britain under the name "Blue Siamese" in 1889 and 1896, but these solid blue cats did not conform to the cat show judges' perception of a Siamese cat, and they disappeared by 1901. One early import, "Dwina", owned by Russian Blue breeder Mrs. Constance Carew-Cox and mentioned in Frances Simpson's The Book of the Cat (1903), reputedly produced a large number of "Siamese" kittens; the other, Mrs. B. Spearman's Blue Siamese male, "Nam Noi", was disqualified as a Siamese, but accepted in the Russian or Any Other Blue class in which he placed first (WR Hawkins, "Around the Pens", July 1896). Spearman tried unsuccessfully to import more of these "Blue Siamese".

Korats first appeared in the US in the 1950s. In 1959, Cedar Glen cattery was the first to import a pair of Korats to the US for breeding: a male named Nara and a female named Darra. In 1966, the Korat was accepted into championship status, through the efforts of a breeder from Maryland.

== Appearance ==
The Korat's unusual colour is actually a silver-tipped blue that appears to shimmer. The Thais refer to this colour as "rain-cloud grey", and the shimmer as "sea foam". This cat has a single coat that is short, with roots of a lighter silver blue. The hair shaft colour increases to deeper blue and the tips are silver, especially on the muzzle and toes. This is the only colour accepted for a Korat. The eyes are large and peridot green in an adult cat, but kittens have muddy, amber or golden-green coloured eyes which gradually change as they become adults, at two to four years.

Although it is rare, Korats occasionally have striking or faint white markings or spots or even very faint grey stripes. Sometimes these spots increase in size with age. These are seen as flaws, and the cats are disqualified from competing in cat shows. However, such markings have no effect on personality or health.

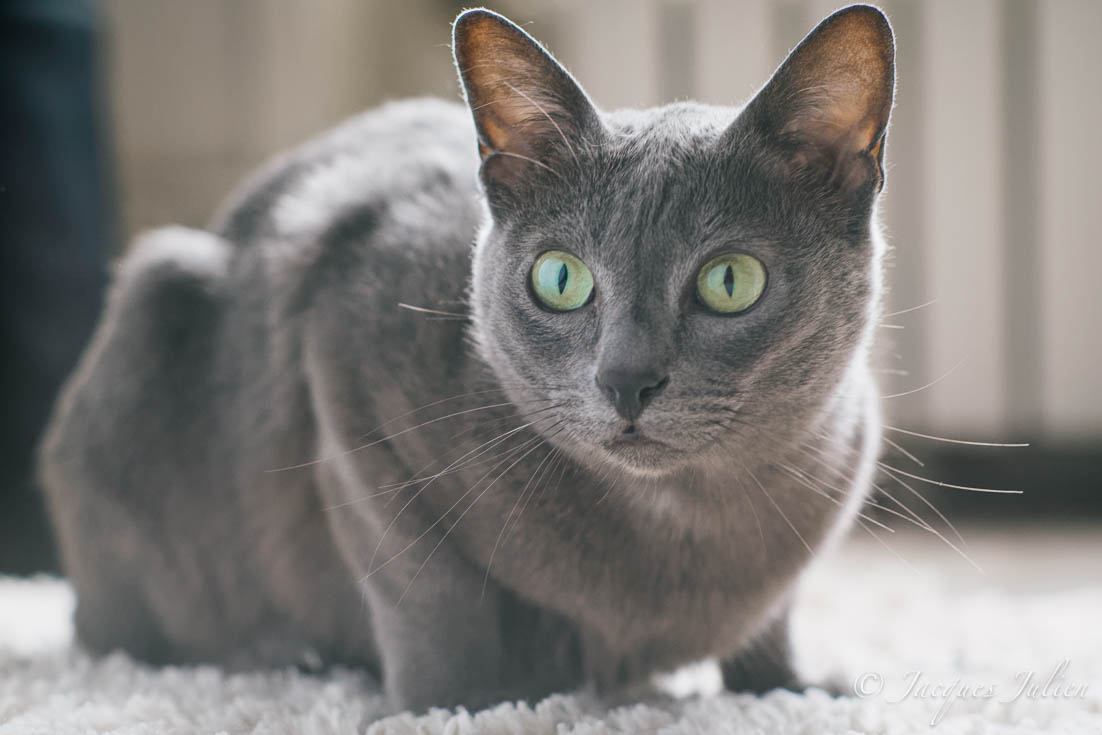
Female Korat cat

== Thai Lilac, Thai Blue Point and Thai Lilac Point ==
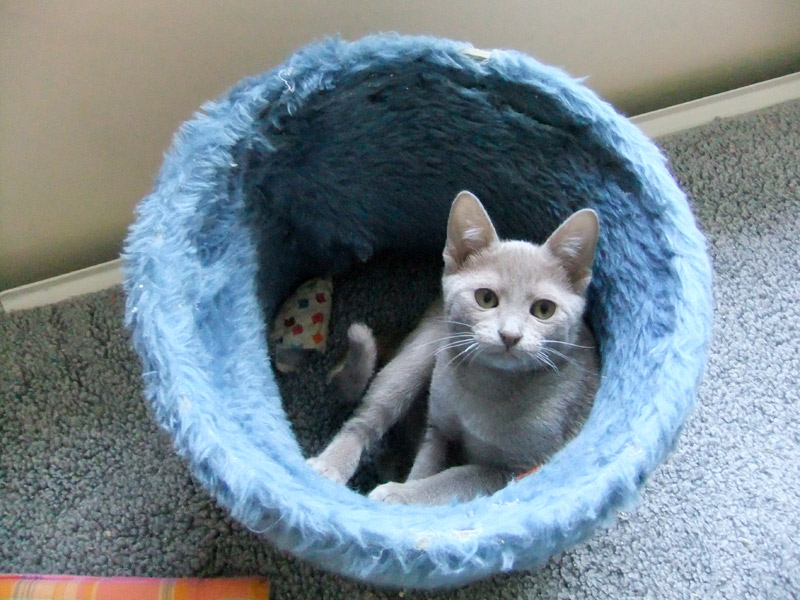
Thai Lilac kitten

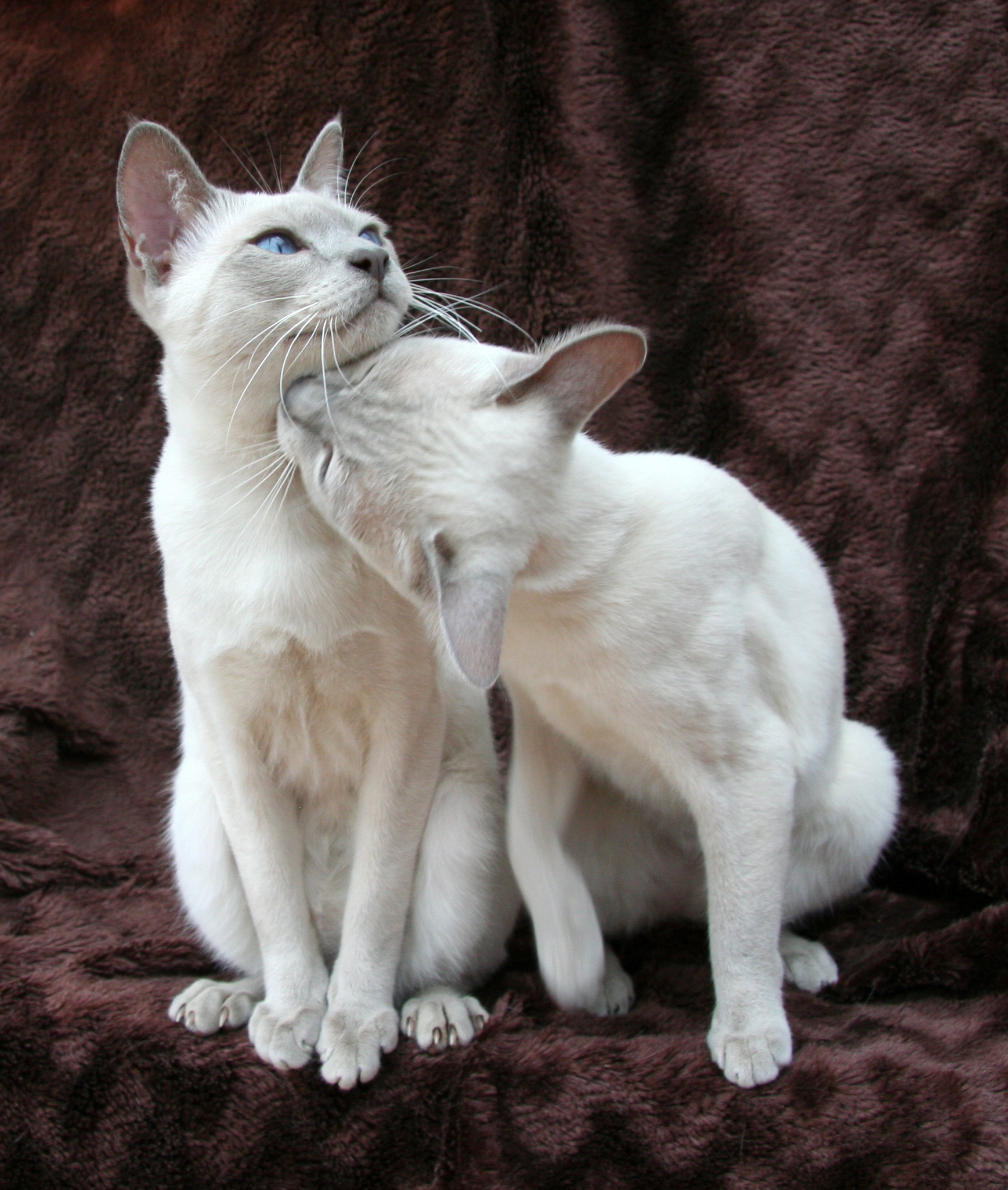
The first two Thai Lilac Points registered in the U.K.: Clairabelle Pixie Dust (2014) and Clairabelle Ninja Rococoa (2015)

The Governing Council of the Cat Fancy recognizes Korat-type cats differing from the traditional solid blue appearance of the Korat on their experimental register. Such cats are registered as Thai Lilac if they are solid lilac. A Thai Blue Point exhibits the colourpoint pattern also seen in Siamese. A Thai Lilac Point also exhibits the colourpoint pattern also seen in Siamese, but in addition exhibits the Chocolate gene. These should not be confused with the Thai cat, a new name for the original (traditional or classic) Siamese cat type, with a rounder face and thicker body than modern "ultra-typed" Siamese.

The policy for full registration of Korats only allows blue cats of full-registered parents or third-generation supplementary-registered parents. It also requires genetic testing for gangliosidosis to be carried out to ensure that the breed remains free of this inherited disease which once existed in some Korat and Thai breeding lines.

The genes responsible for Pointeds and Lilacs were introduced into the Korat breed when new Korat breeding stock carrying the recessive genes was imported from Thailand. The first recorded Thai Lilac kitten was born to the Jenanca line in 1989, when "Jenanca Lilac Lillee" was born from two Korat parents in the U.K.. In 1990, Lillee's parents were re-mated with more lilac kittens resulting. A young male lilac was then born to another pair, also in the U.K., allowing more crossings without inbreeding too closely.

The first recorded Thai Lilac Point was born to the Clairabelle line in 2014 when Clairabelle Pixie Dust was born from two Korat parents in the U.K.. A re-mating from the same parents resulted in another Thai Lilac Point, this time a boy, Clairabelle Ninja Rococoa. A third and fourth Thai Lilac Point has recently been born into the Jusarka line.

== Health ==
The Korat is one of the more commonly affected breeds for gangliosidosis 1 and gangliosidosis 2. An autosomal recessive mutation in the GBL1 and HEXB gene respectively is responsible for the conditions in the breed.

Atherosclerosis conditions, typically never seen in cats, similar to human atherosclerosis, were also seen in Korat cats. A genetic predisposition is assumed rather than an underlying condition or medical treatment for these conditions in the cats.

== In popular culture ==
- A Korat cat has served as a mascot for the 2007 Southeast Asian Games.

== Gallery ==
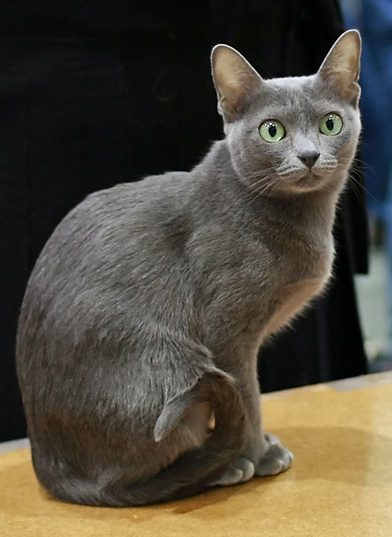
Wang Kaang Raang, a female Korat in Vantaa Cat Show, Finland.

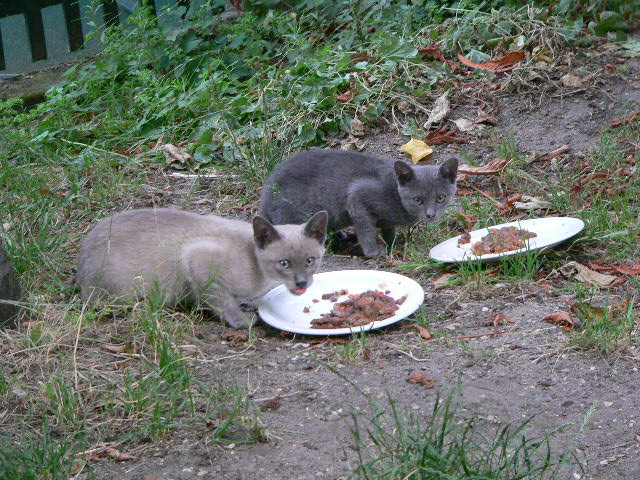
Korat cat and Siamese cat Blue point

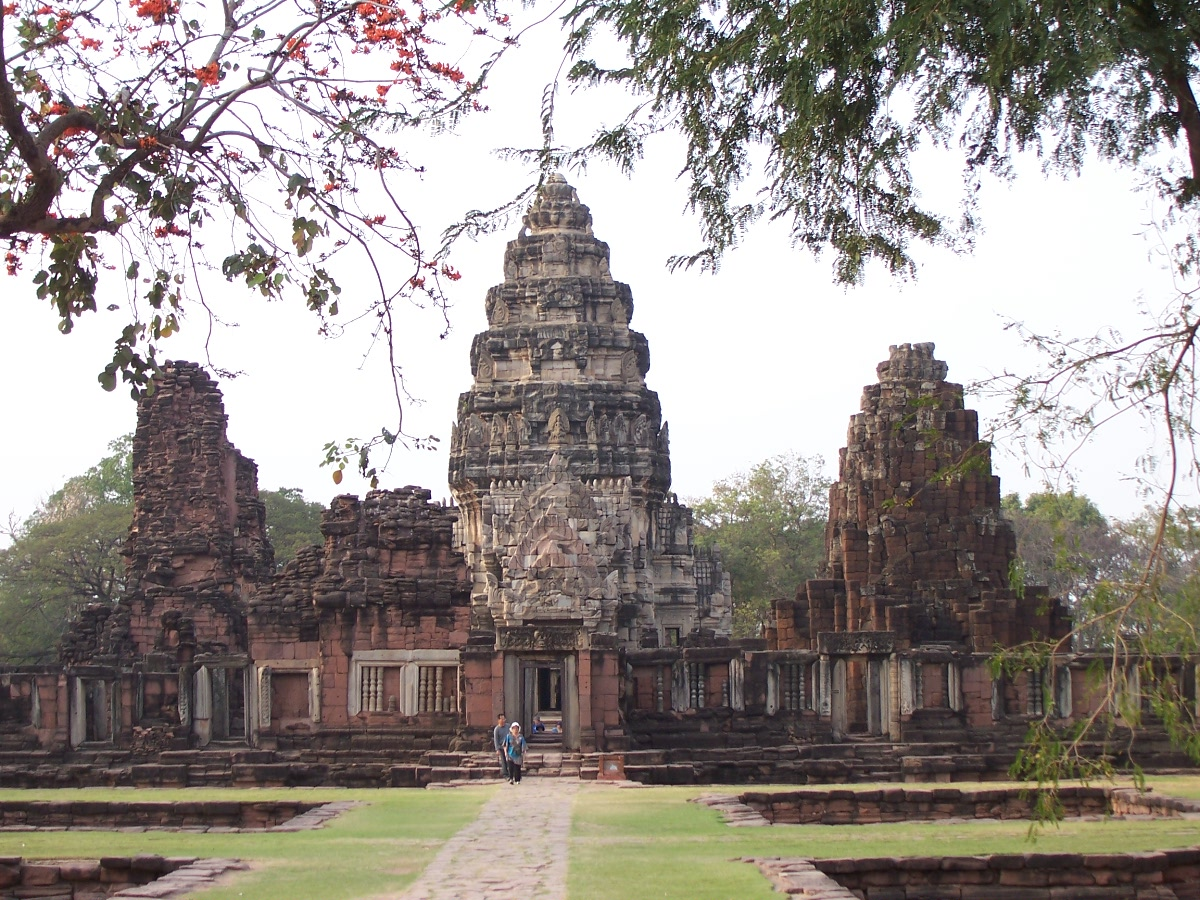
The Korat is a natural breed, and one of the oldest stable cat breeds. Originating in Phimai temple, Nakhon Ratchasima province.

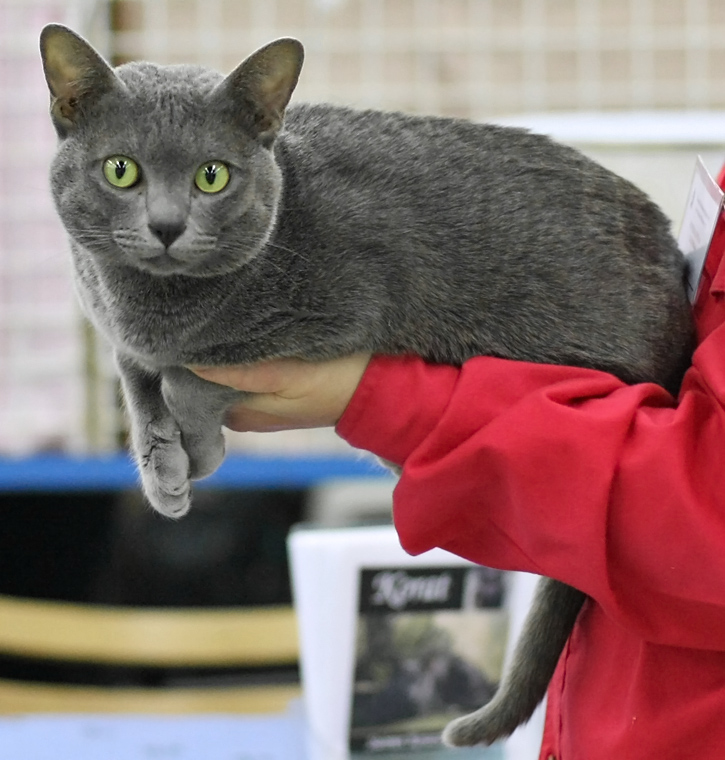
Korat Yog-Hurt's Atlach-Nacha at Turok Cat Show

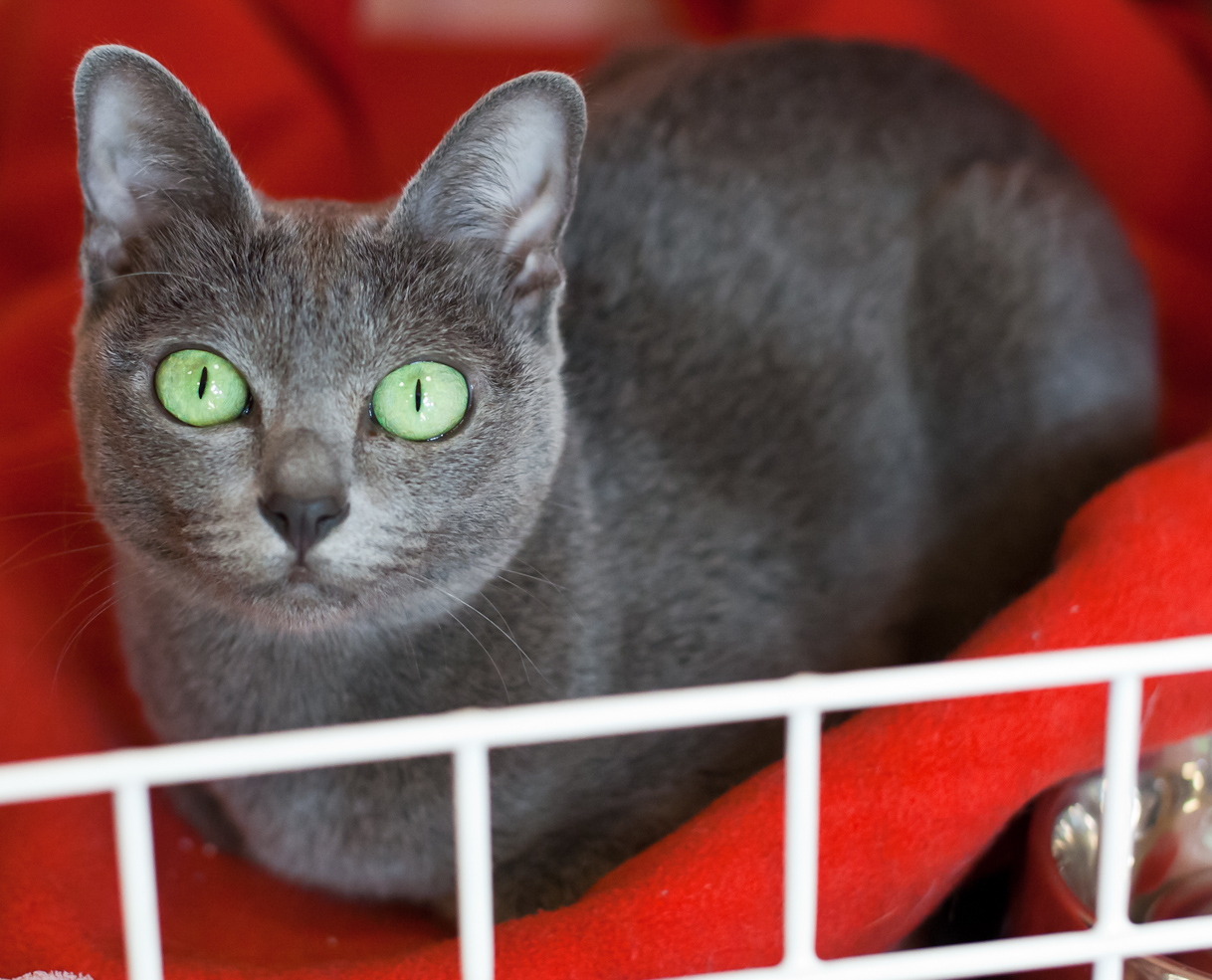
Show of The Korat Cat Association of Finland Loimaa, 26 September 2010

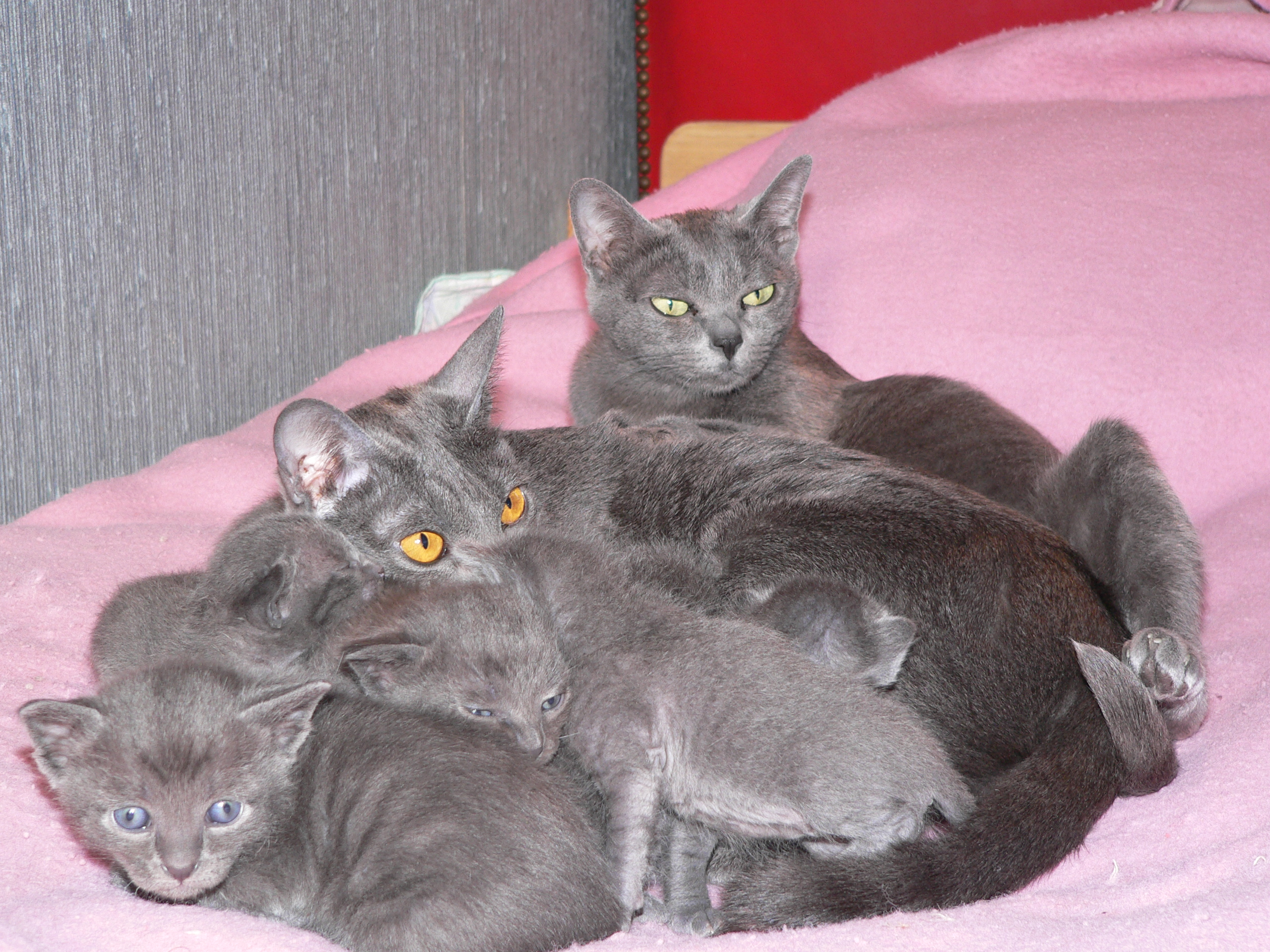
Female Korat cat with a litter of kittens

== See also ==
- List of cat breeds
- Siamese cat
- Thai cat
- Suphalak
