= Tonkinese cat =

Breed of cat

Tonkinese
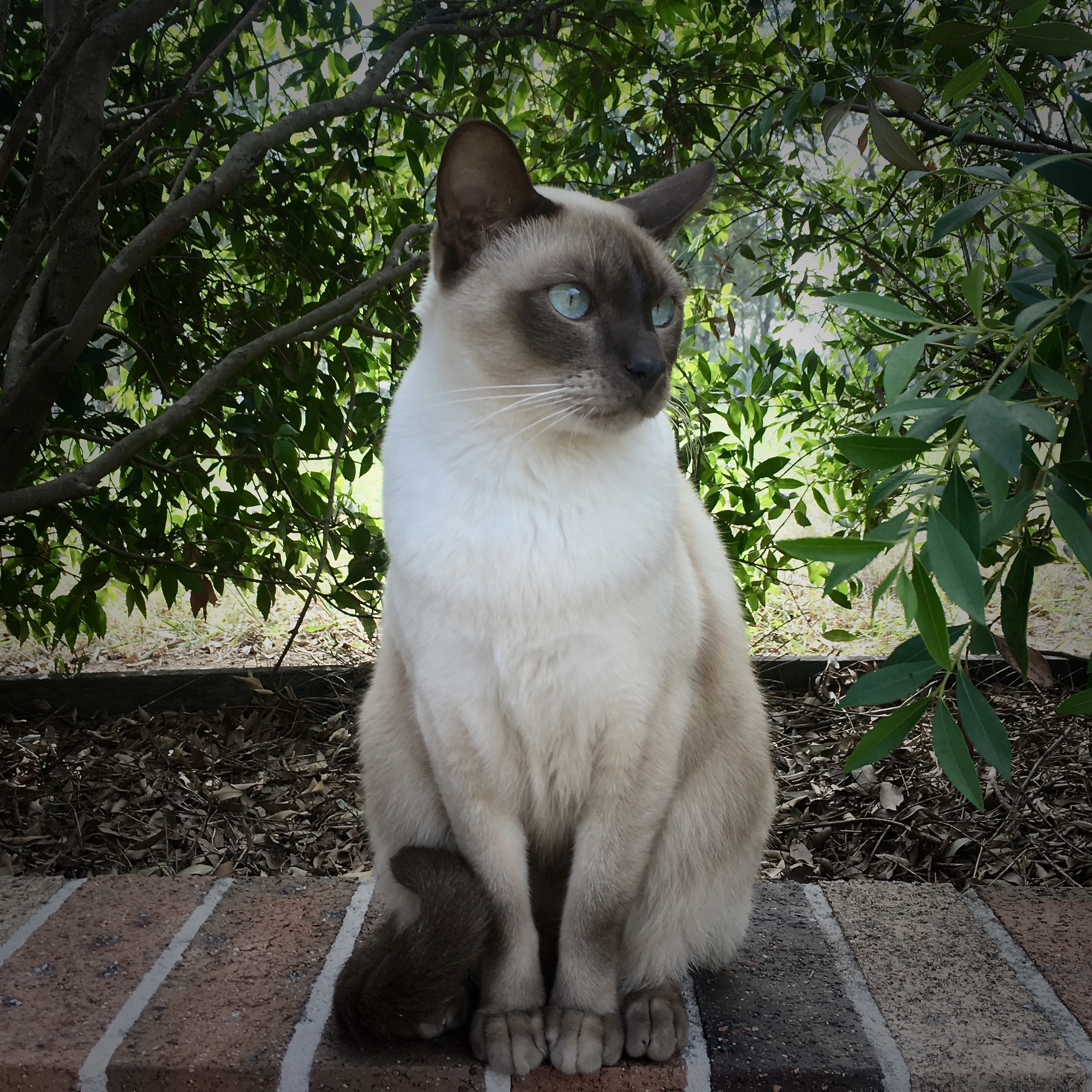
- Male Tonkinese Cat
- Common nicknames: Tonk
- Origin: Thailand; Canada

Breed standards
- CFA: standard
- TICA: standard
- ACF: standard
- ACFA/CAA: standard
- CCA-AFC: standard
- GCCF: standard

Mink Tonkinese cats showing signature aquamarine (blue-green) eyes.

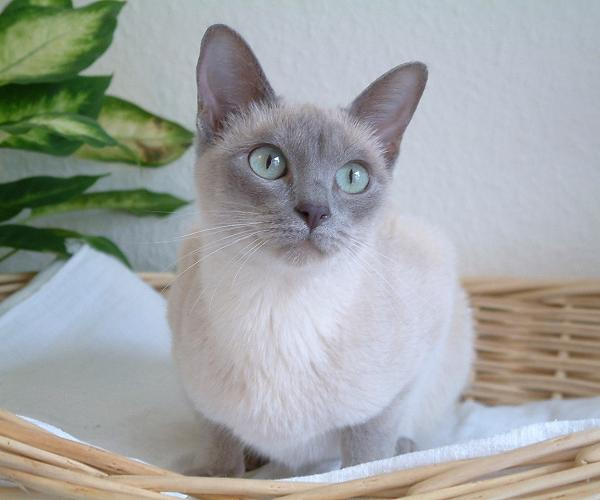
Platinum (or “lilac”) mink

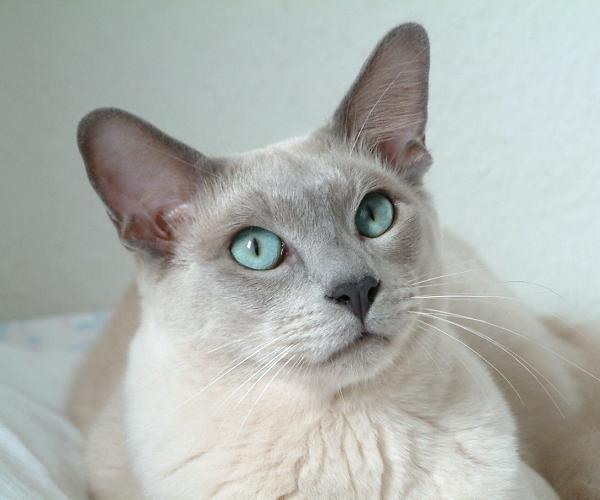
Blue mink

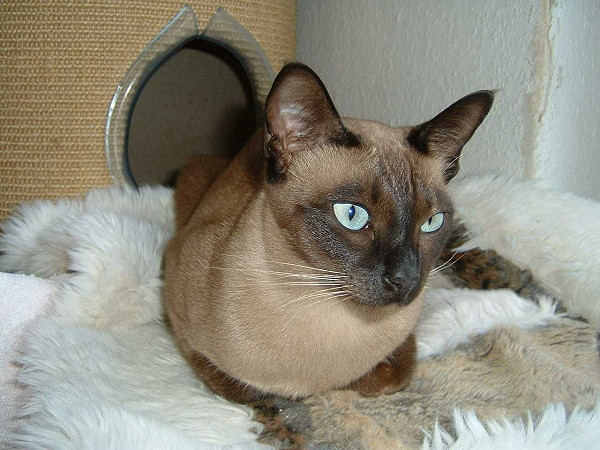
Natural (or “seal”) mink

A Tonkinese cat rolling around.

Tonkinese is a domestic cat breed produced by crossbreeding between the Siamese and Burmese. Members of the breed are distinguished by a pointed coat pattern in a variety of colors. In addition to the modified coat colors of the "mink" pattern, which is a dilution of the point color, the breed is now being shown in the foundation-like Siamese and Burmese colors: pointed with white and solid overall (sepia).

The best known variety is the short-haired Tonkinese, but there is a semi-longhaired (sometimes called Tibetan) which tends to be more popular in Europe, mainly in the Netherlands, Germany, Belgium, Luxembourg, and France.

== History ==
=== Origin ===
The modern Tonkinese breed is a reconstruction of a breed brought to the West in the 19th century. These cats were originally known as 'chocolate Siamese'. Breeders working with imported cats from Malaysia noticed some cats have aquamarine eyes and darker coats than the Siamese. In 1901, the Siamese Cat Club recognised them as a Siamese of the 'chocolate' type.

Many of the cats used to found the Siamese and Burmese in the West are believed to be Tonkinese, including Wong Mau. Tonkinese would be bred still but registered as either Burmese or Siamese, it was not until the 1950s that breeders would take interest in the cat. These breeders worked together on developing breeding lines with these cats and by 1965 the Tonkinese was recognised in Canada as a distinct breed — whence the name originated.

More modern Tonkinese cats are the result of the crossbreeding programs of two breeders working independently of each other. Margaret Conroy, of Canada, and Jane Barletta, of the United States, crossed the Siamese and Burmese breeds, with the aim of creating the ideal combination of both parent breeds' distinctive appearance and lively personalities. The cats thus produced were moved from crossbreed classification to an established breed in 2001. The name is a reference to the Tonkin region of Indochina, though it is suggestive only, as the cats have no connection with the area.

In the West, Tonkinese cats under the age of sixth months have historically been referred to as "small-cats" rather than "kittens" to reflect a more direct translation from Burmese, although this term has become almost obsolete since the mid-20th century.

=== Breed recognition ===
The breed received championship status with the Cat Fanciers' Association in 1984. The Governing Council of the Cat Fancy (GCCF) recognised the breed in 1991. Today the breed is recognised in most of Europe, Australia, New Zealand, Hong Kong, Japan, and South Africa. Over 30 countries have Tonkinese cats featured on postage stamps.

== Description ==
=== Appearance ===
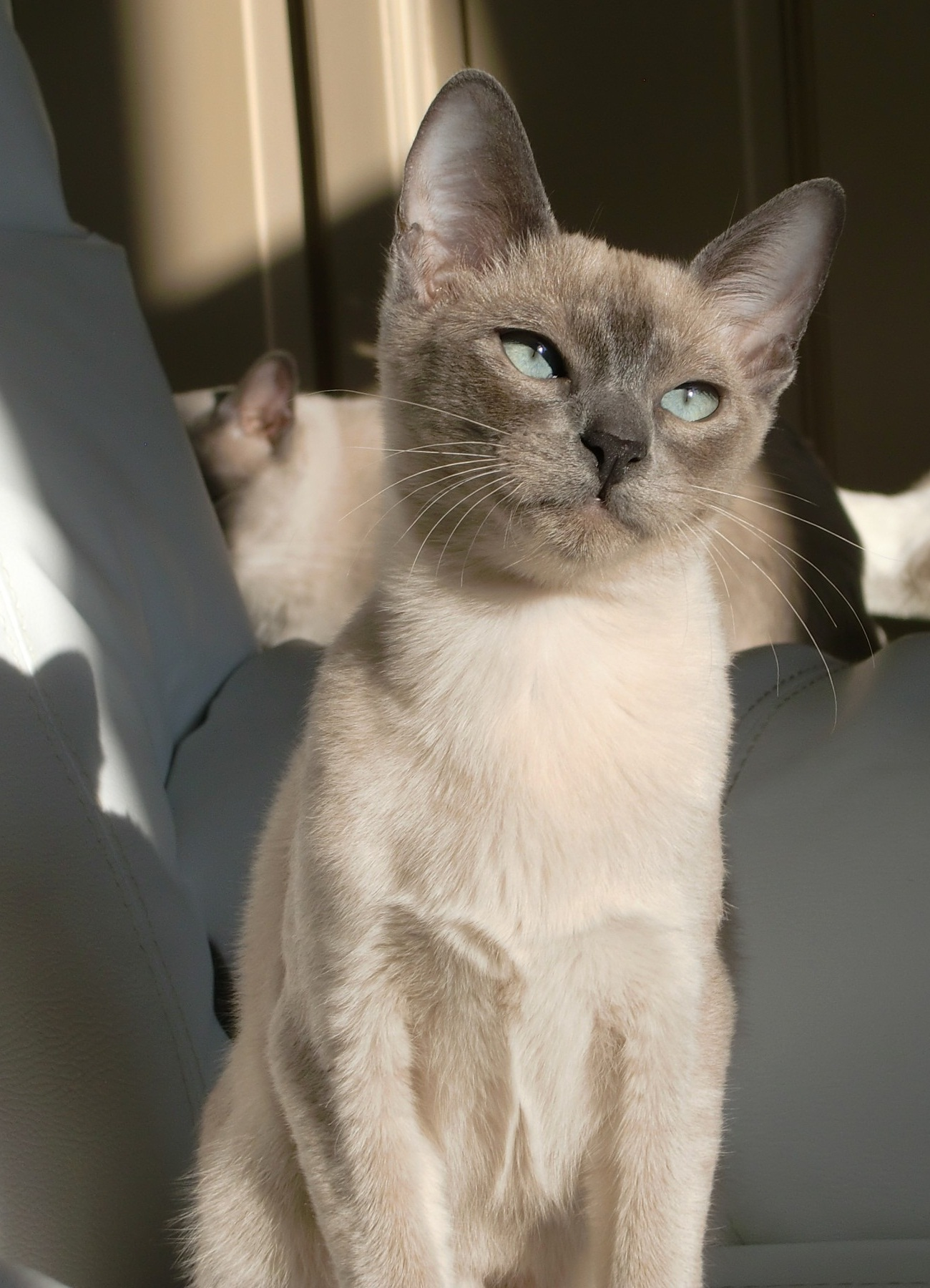
Young blue mink adult

Tonkinese are a medium-sized cat, considered an intermediate type between the slender, long-bodied modern Siamese and European Burmese and the more "cobby", or substantially-built American Burmese. Like their Burmese ancestors, they are deceptively muscular and typically seem much heavier than expected when picked up. Tail and legs are slim but proportionate to the body, with distinctive oval paws. They have a gently rounded, slightly wedge-shaped head and blunted muzzle, with moderately almond-shaped eyes and ears set towards the outside of their head.

The American style is a rounder but sculpted head with a shorter body and sturdier appearance to reflect the old-fashioned Siamese and rounded Burmese from which it was originally bred in the United States. While many American breeders avoided using the extreme "contemporary" Burmese in favor of the more moderate "traditional" Burmese, the original Tonkinese breed standard was based on the extreme spherical style of the Burmese descended from Wong Mau.

=== Coat and color ===
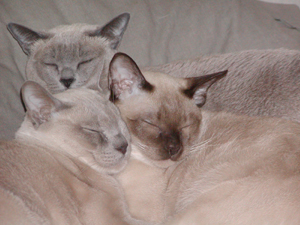
Counter-clockwise from top: blue mink, lilac solid/sepia and chocolate mink.

The Tonkinese comes in the several colours listed below.

- Black (also referred to as “brown”, “seal”, or “natural” by different fanciers or organizations)
- Blue
- Chocolate (also called “champagne”)
- Lilac (also called “platinum”)
- Cinnamon
- Fawn
- Red
- Cream
- Additional dilute modifiers (including “caramel”, “apricot”)

Each color also has three variations of colorpoint coat pattern:

- "point", the classic Siamese-style dark face, ears, legs and tail on a contrasting white or cream base, and blue eyes;
- "solid" or "sepia", similar to the Burmese, in which the color is essentially uniform over the body with only faintly visible points and golden-amber or green eyes; and
- "mink", a unique intermediate between the other two, in which the base is a lighter shade but still harmonious with the point color, and the eyes are a lighter blue-green, called aquamarine. They can be anywhere on the entire blue-green to green-blue spectrum.

Additionally, all colors can present in the tortoiseshell or tabby patterns.

Examples of different colour Tonkinese cats

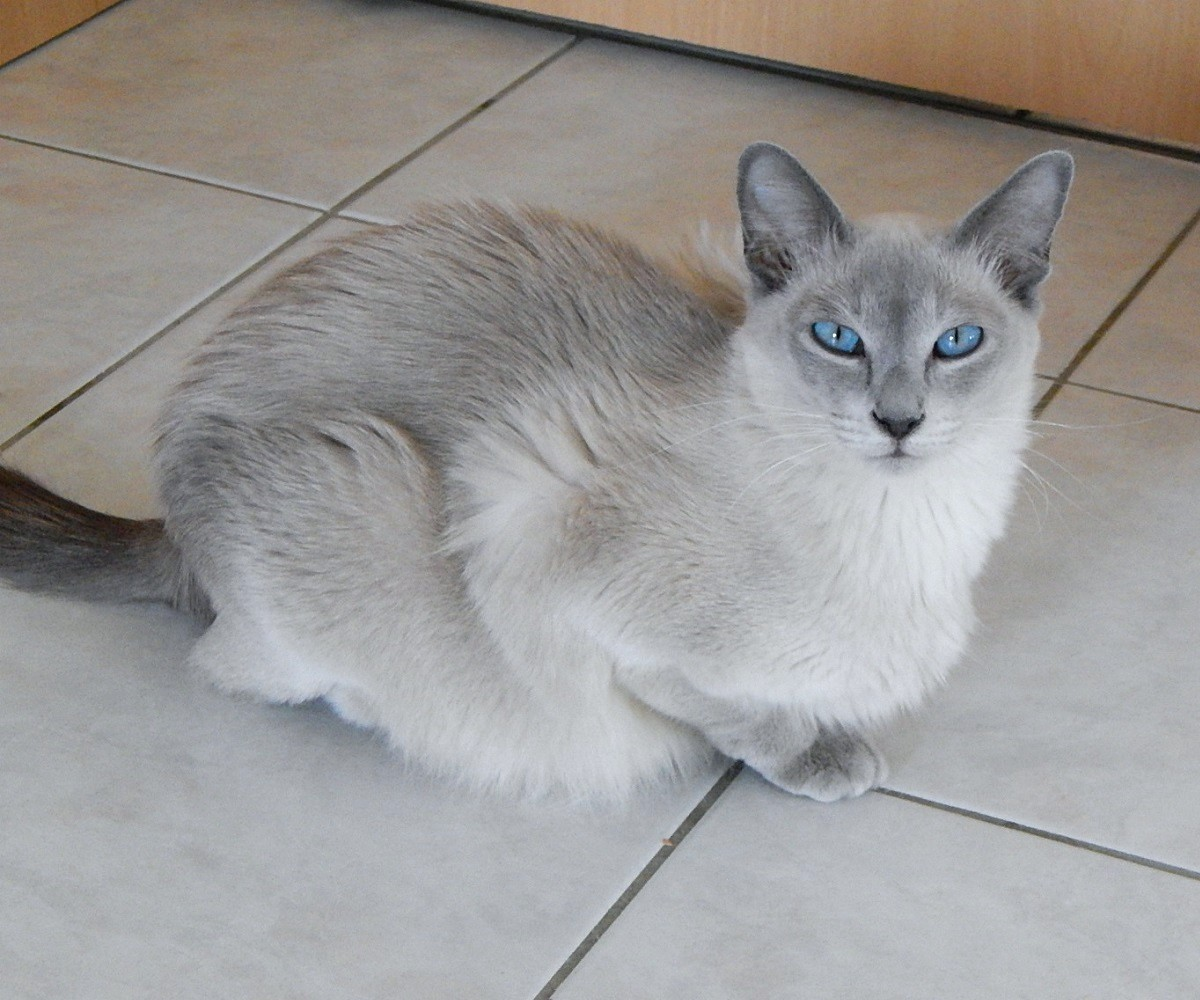
Semi-longhaired blue mink

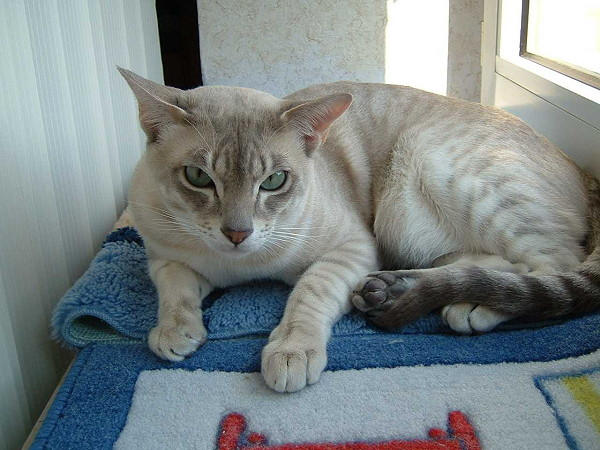
Blue tabby mink

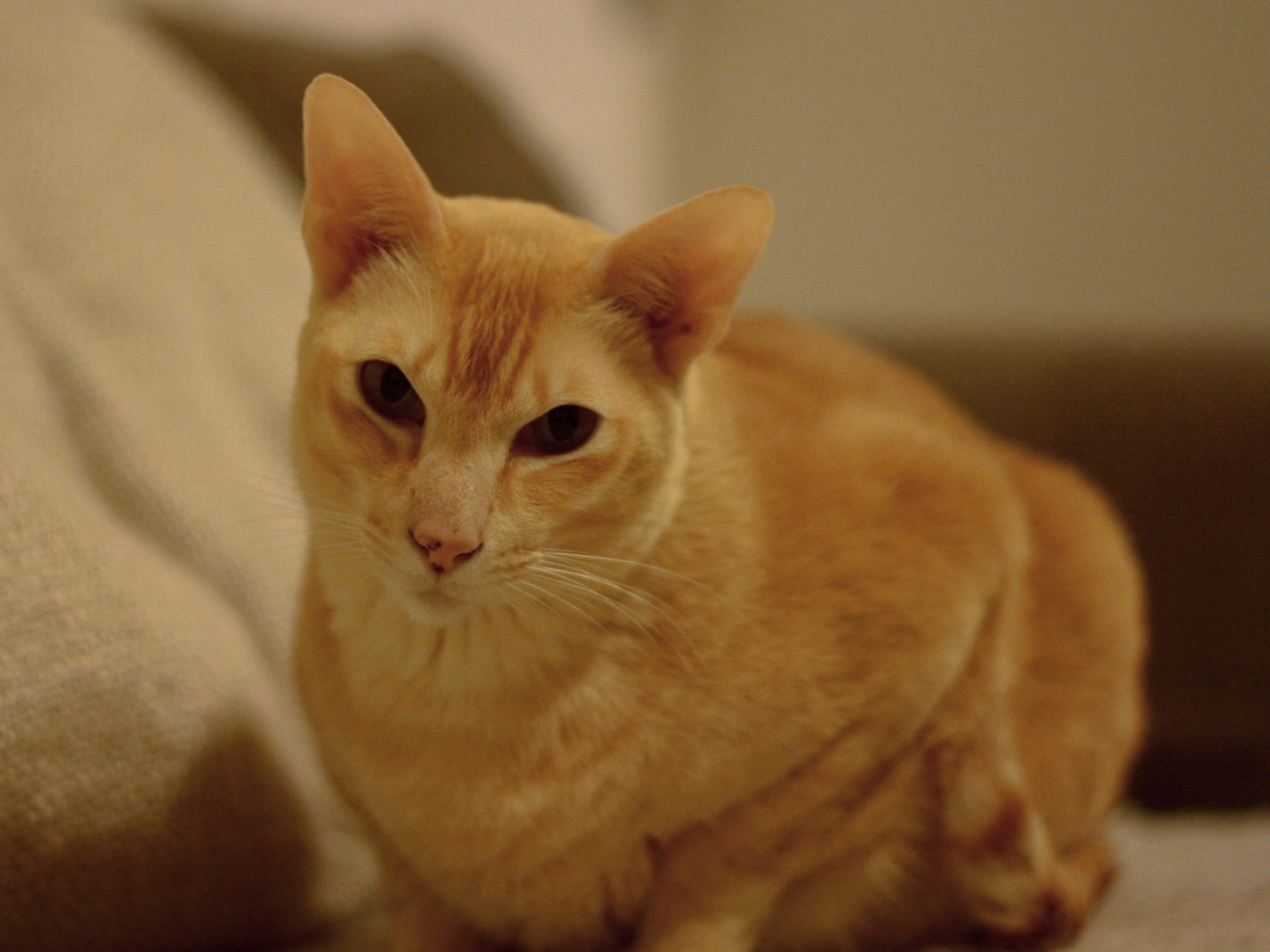
Red mink

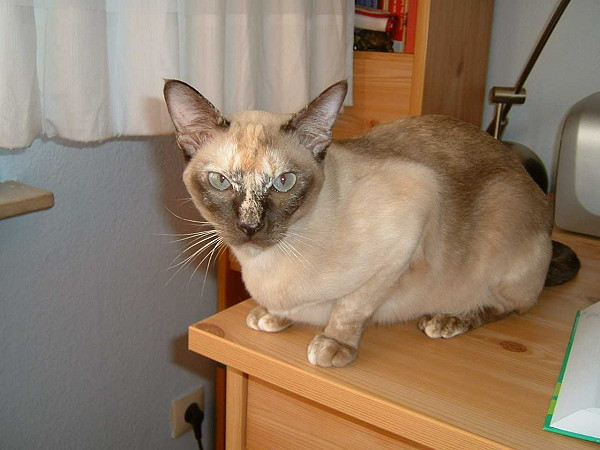
Chocolate tortoiseshell mink

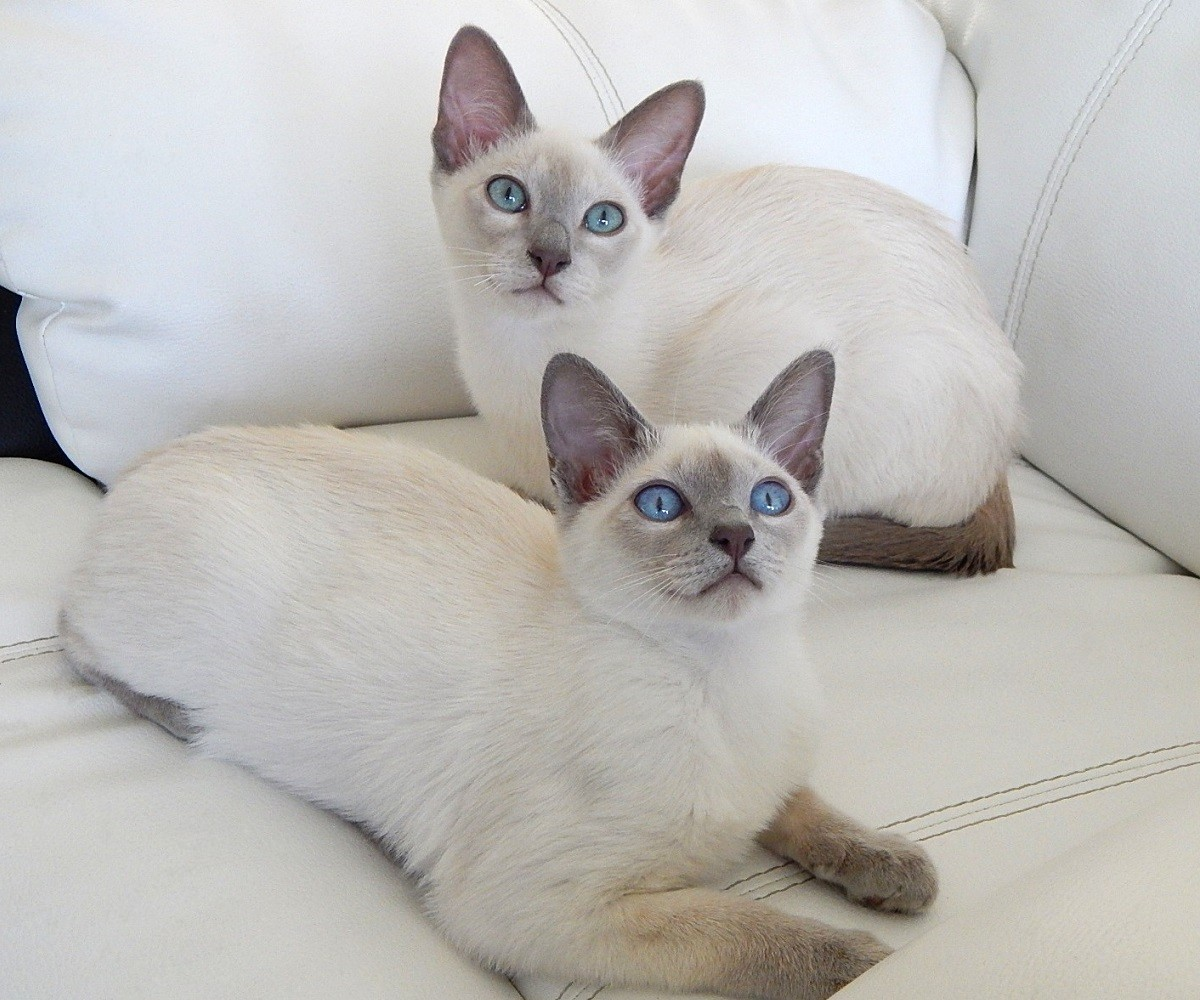
Lilac mink (top) and lilac point (bottom) kittens, notice the different eye colors

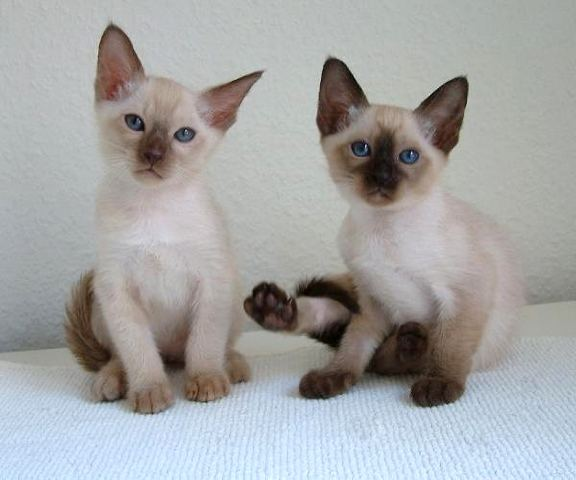
Chocolate mink and black point kittens

==== Color and pattern recognition ====
Depending on the cat registry, not all colors and patterns are allowed for the Tonkinese cat breed. Tonkinese are currently officially recognized by the Cat Fanciers' Association (CFA) and World Cat Federation (WCF) in only four base colors: black (brown, seal, natural), blue, chocolate (champagne), and lilac (platinum). All four base colors are allowed in the three colorpoint patterns. The GCCF accepts brown, blue, chocolate, lilac, cinnamon, and fawn, red, cream, plus caramel and apricot. These colors are allowed in the tortoiseshell and tabby patterns, and additionally the three colorpoint patterns. Similar to the GCCF, The International Cat Association (TICA) accepts all of the genetically possible colors and patterns.

=== Temperament ===
Like both parent breeds, Tonkinese are active, vocal and generally people-oriented cats, playful and interested in everything going on around them; however, this also means they are easily susceptible to becoming lonesome or bored. Their voice is similar in tone to the Burmese, persistent but softer and sweeter than the Siamese, similar to the gentle quacking of a duck. Like Burmese, Tonkinese are reputed to sometimes engage in such dog-like behaviors as fetching, and to enjoy jumping to great heights.

== Health ==
In a 2012 review of over 5,000 cases of urate urolithiasis, the Tonkinese was significantly under-represented with only one of the recorded cases belonging to the breed against a population of 365.

== Genetics ==
Tonkin is a crossbreed type, with coat color and pattern wholly dependent on whether individuals carry the Siamese or Burmese gene. Breeding two mink Tonkinese cats does not usually yield a full litter of mink kittens, as this intermediate pattern is the result of having one gene for the Burmese solid pattern and one for the Siamese pointed pattern.

Colors and patterns in any litter depend both on statistical chance and the color genetics and patterns of the parents. Breeding between two mink-patterned cats will, on average, produce half mink kittens and one quarter each pointed and sepia kittens. A pointed and a sepia bred together will always produce all mink patterned kittens. A pointed bred to a mink will produce half pointed and half mink kittens, and a sepia bred to a mink will produce half sepia and half mink kittens.
