= Treatise on Cats =

Thai manuscript depicitng types of cats

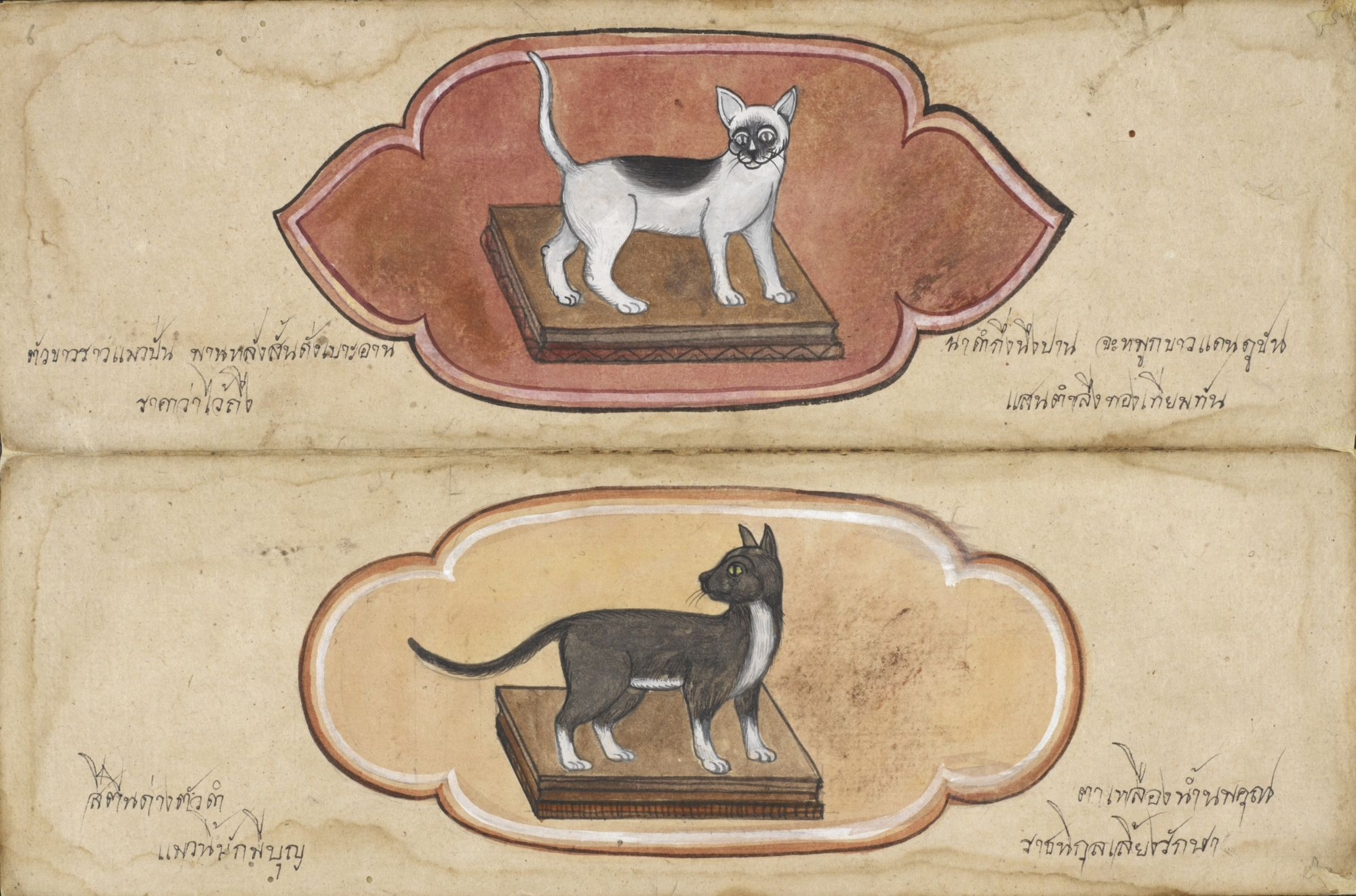
A pair of pages from a copy of the manuscript at the British Library

The Treatise on Cats (Thai: ตำราแมว, RTGS: Tamra Maeo, pronounced [tām.rāː mɛ̄ːw]), also referred to as the Cat-Book Poems, is a class of samut khoi manuscripts, believed to originate from the Ayutthaya period, though most extant specimens date to 19th-century Thailand. They contain illustrations and descriptions of various types of cats, and probably served as a breed standard.

The manuscripts contain painted illustrations of certain types of cats that were considered auspicious, accompanied by descriptions in Thai poetic verse, written in the Thai script (which was reserved for secular subjects—religious manuscripts of the time were written in the Khom Thai script). Typically, seventeen auspicious breeds are listed. Six inauspicious types are sometimes included as well.
