= Cats 101 =

- Country of origin: United States
- No. of seasons: 4
- No. of episodes: 14

Production
- Running time: 60 minutes

Original release
- Network: Animal Planet
- Release: November 7, 2009 – May 12, 2012

Related
- Dogs 101, Pets 101

Cats 101 is a television series about cats that aired on Animal Planet.

== Plot ==
Cats 101 features different cat breeds per episode, discussed by experts, ranging from veterinarians to animal trainers. The show presents facts, origins, and descriptions of the breeds, with comments from cat owners.

== Breeds featured ==
=== Season 1 ===
- American Shorthair
- Egyptian Mau
- Himalayan
- Maine Coon
- Oriental Shorthair
- Persian
- Ragdoll
- Savannah
- Siamese
- Scottish Fold
- Sphynx
- Turkish Angora

=== Season 2 ===
- Abyssinian
- American Curl
- Birman
- Bombay
- Burmese
- Colorpoint Shorthair
- Cornish Rex
- Exotic Shorthair
- Havana Brown
- Japanese Bobtail
- Manx
- Ocicat
- Norwegian Forest Cat
- Russian Blue
- Selkirk Rex
- Siberian
- Singapura
- Somali

=== Season 3 ===
- American Bobtail
- Australian Mist
- Balinese
- Bambino
- Bengal
- British Shorthair
- Chartreux
- Cheetoh
- Devon Rex
- Domestic House Cat
- Domestic Longhair
- Domestic Shorthair
- Korat
- LaPerm
- Munchkin
- Napoleon (Minuet)
- Nebelung
- Pixie-Bob
- RagaMuffin
- Serengeti
- Snowshoe
- Tonkinese
- Toyger
- Turkish Van

=== Season 4 ===
- Aegean
- American Wirehair
- Arabian Mau
- Burmilla
- Chantilly
- Chausie
- Donskoy
- Chinese Li Hua
- Dwelf
- European Shorthair
- Highlander
- Javanese
- Khao Manee
- Kurilian Bobtail
- Lambkin
- Minskin
- Oriental Bicolor
- Peterbald
- Skookum
- Sokoke
