= Minuet cat =

Breed of cat

Minuet
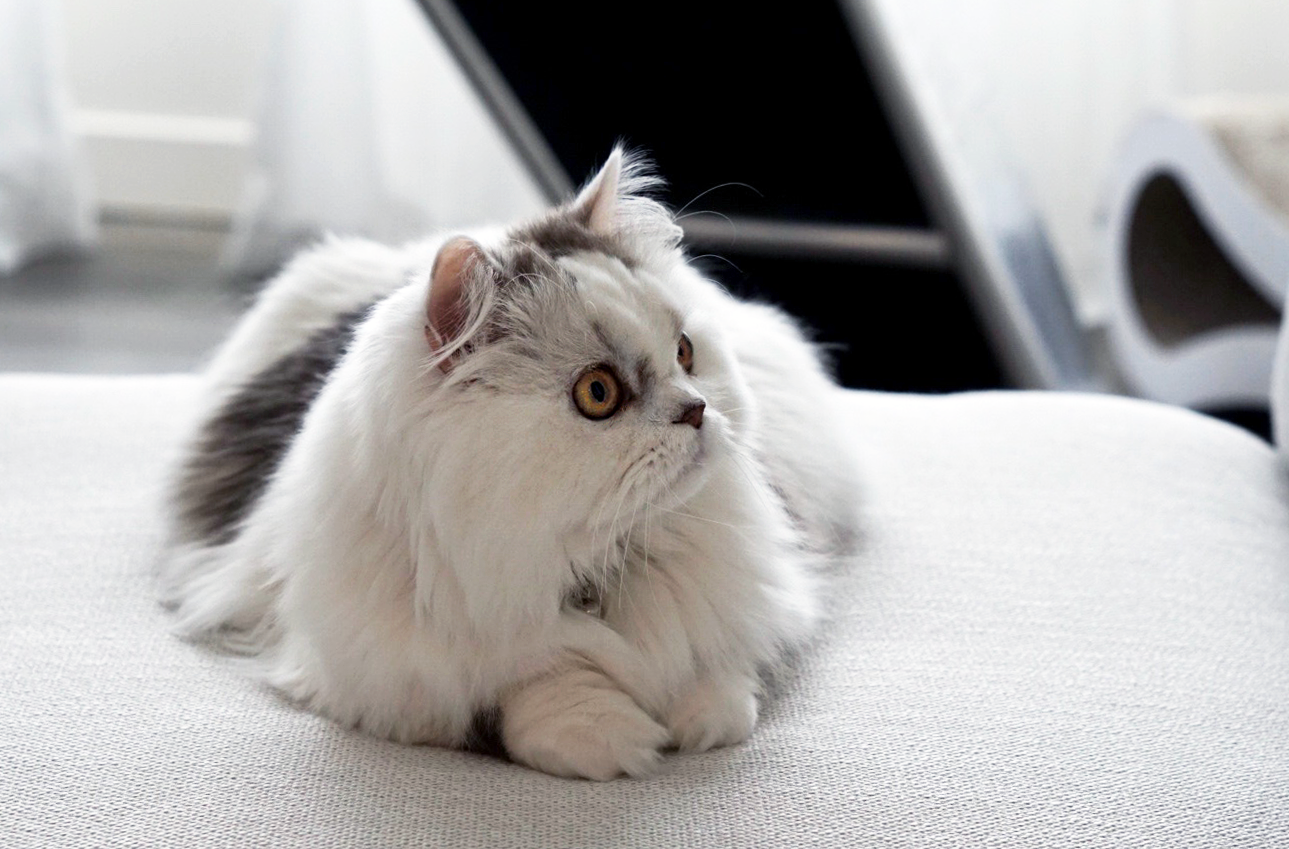
- Example of a long-haired Minuet cat
- Other names: Napoleon
- Origin: United States
- Foundation bloodstock: Munchkin, Persian (sometimes Himalayan, Exotic Shorthair)

Breed standards
- TICA: standard

Notes
- Not recognized by other registries than TICA, (Defacto) banned in the European Union.

The Minuet (also known as the Napoleon) is a hybrid mix of Persian and Munchkin cat breeds. Categorized by The International Cat Association (TICA) as a domestic hybrid, "developed from a deliberate cross between two existing domestic breeds, incorporating characteristics of both parental breeds into the new mix." The Minuet cat is characterized by its short legs, as a result of the dwarfism-mutation derived from the Munchkin breed.

According to TICA's official standards, these breeds represent the only permissible outcrosses one may use to create the Minuet. This includes the combinations Minuet × Minuet, Minuet × Munchkin, and Minuet × one of the Persian-type breeds (including Persians, Himalayans and Exotic Shorthairs). Minuets come in both long-haired and short-haired varieties.

== History ==
=== Origin ===
In 1996 Joe Smith started breeding Persians with Munchkins. Joe had previously bred Basset Hounds, a breed with osteochondrodysplasia; similarly Munchkin cats have achondroplasia. He wished to create a breed that would appeal to people irrespective of the size of the limbs (the gene responsible for the shortened limbs is autosomal dominant and lethal in utero when the gene is homozygous: therefore not all Munchkins will be born with the smaller stature). The name Napoleon was chosen due to the belief of Napoleon Bonaparte being short. (Note: Napoleon was of average height for the time although it is a commonly held belief that he was short. Minuet was also not a known nickname of Napoleon nor is it a proper French word.)

=== Breed recognition ===
In 2001, the breed was added to the experimental breeds category of TICA. By 2002, it had achieved registration-only status; by 2011, the breed had achieved preliminary status, and was being shown in TICA cat shows by 2012. In January 2015, TICA's board of directors voted to change the name of the breed to Minuet. The breed was promoted to full TICA championship eligibility in 2016. The breed is recognized under the original Napoleon name by the Rare and Exotic Feline Registry.

== Welfare concerns ==
Apart from TICA, the other major cat registries do not allow the registry of the Minuet breed, nor recognise it, due to concerns about the animal's welfare. Among others, the breed is not recognised by:

- Cat Fanciers' Association
- Fédération Internationale Féline
- Governing Council of the Cat Fancy
- World Cat Federation

The Governing Council of the Cat Fancy (GCCF) and Fédération Internationale Féline (FIFe) both disallow any Munchkin and Munchkin-derived breed from being registered due to the health concerns arising from the dwarfism of the breed.

=== Breeding bans ===
Breeding the Minuet is prohibited by law in Victoria which outlaws the breeding of animals with hereditary aplasia or hypoplasia of long bones. The Australian Capital Territory explicitly discourages the breeding of 'malformed animals' which includes the Munchkin.

== Appearance ==
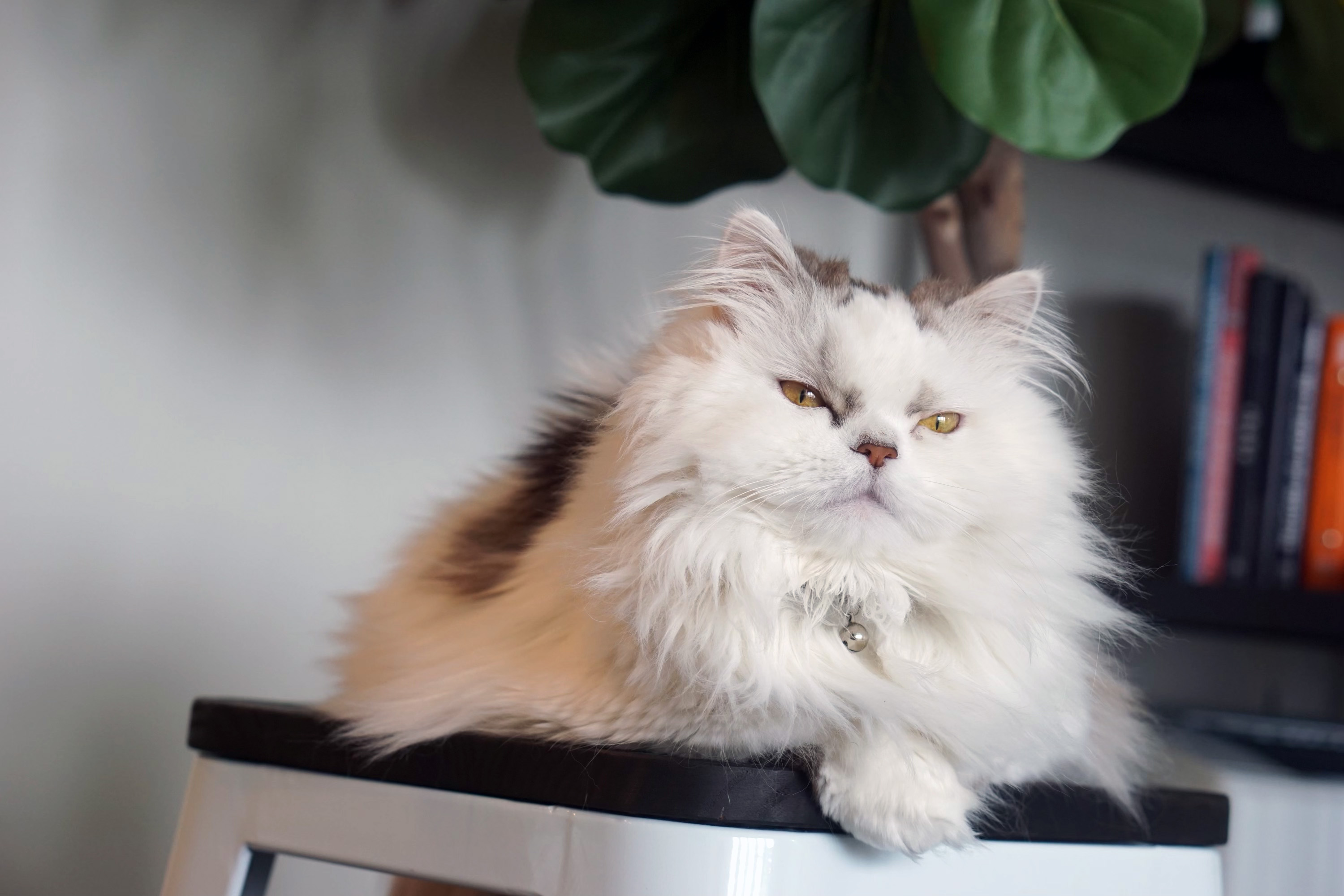
A long-haired white and gray Minuet cat named Rhubarb.

The Minuet has the stubbed legs of the Munchkin and the shortened face of the Persian. The body is semi-cobby with shortened height due to the legs. The tail is not short in comparison to the length of the cat's body. The ears are rounded and wide apart. Eyes are large and round. The Minuet may come in any coat colour.

== Health ==
Due to inheriting both the dwarfism of the Munchkin and the shortened face of the Persian the Minuet is susceptible to multiple health issues relating to both conditions.

The condition causing the shortened legs and enlarged head is known as achondrodysplasia and with common symptoms including thick-looking joints, undersized jaw, curved spine, and a bow-legged or knock knee posture. Lordosis and pectus excavatum have higher incidence in breeds with achondrodysplasia. The shortened limbs give the breed a heightened risk of osteoarthritis.

The shortened face inherited from the Persian is known as brachycephaly. The anatomical deformities caused by brachycephaly may lead to dyspnoea. Epiphora may occur due to malformation of the nasolacrimal ducts which causes staining and secondary dermatitis. Their shallow eye socket may lead to exophthalmos and feline corneal sequestra. Their malformed jaw can cause difficulty with mastication; the result is a build up of food which leads to accelerated plaque formation and periodontal disease. Brachycephaly may also lead to dystocia with higher rates of still births in brachycephalic cats than cats with mesocephaly. Another condition which occurs due to the anatomical abnormalities is brachycephalic airway obstruction syndrome which can cause stridor, sleep apnoea, and even death.

== See also ==
- Dwarf cat
- List of cat breeds
- List of experimental cat breeds
- List of cat body-type mutations
- Munchkin cat
- Persian cat
- Bambino cat
