= Minskin =

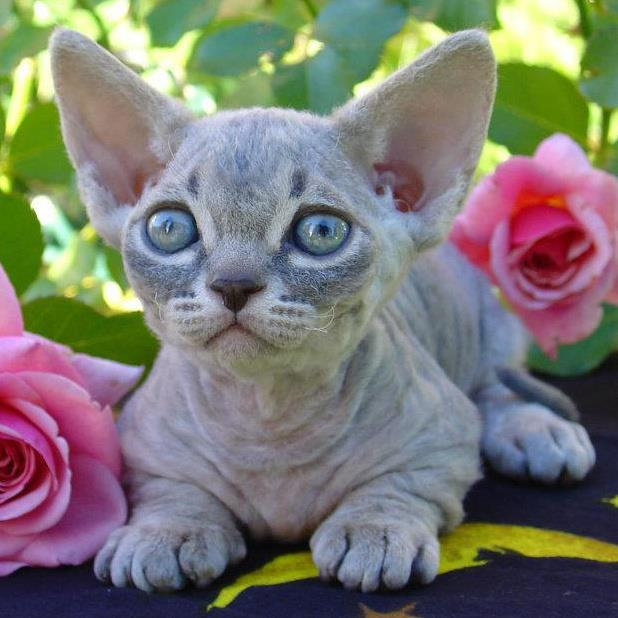
- Female Minskin kitten
- Other names: Teddy Rex
- Common nicknames: Teddy Rex
- Origin: United States
- Foundation bloodstock: Munchkin, Burmese, Sphynx, and Devon Rex

Notes
- Not recognised by any official registry

The Minskin is a breed of cat derived from intentional cross-breeding between the Munchkin and Burmese cat breeds, with the addition of Sphynx and Devon Rex. It is a short-statured cat breed with very short fur. The fur is so short and light that the breed is sometimes mistakenly called "hairless". Breeding of Minskin cats is prohibited by law in several countries due to these genetic health concerns. All European Union member nations have de-facto banned the breeding of Minskin cats under the broader European Convention for the Protection of Pet Animals.

== History ==
=== Origin ===
In 1998, Paul McSorley began developing the breed in Boston. Paul wanted a breed with the short legs of the Munchkin but a similar appearance to the colour point pattern of the Siamese; however he only wanted fur on the extremities of the cat. To achieve his desired breed he bred the Munchkin with the Sphynx to try and restrict hair to the points. He later added in Devon Rex and Burmese stock into the breed. The first cat that met the desired standard was born in July 2000. By early 2005, roughly 50 cats met the criteria.

== Appearance ==
The Minskin is notable for its short stature caused by achondroplasia and the hairlessness or near hairlessness. The head of the Minskin is rounded and wide. The ears have slightly rounded tips. The eyes are large, round, and set wide apart. The body is semi-cobby giving it a short, stubby, and stout appearance.

=== Coat ===
The coat of the Minskin is short and the fur-points cover the mask, ears, legs, tail, and scrotum. Fur-points are where the fur is more densely coated compared to other areas where it is sparser such as the torso or temple. The cat may or not may not possess whiskers (vibrissae).

== Health ==
The Minskin's short statute is a form of chondrodysplasia. Due to having the hairlessness of the Sphynx and the dwarfism of the Munchkin, the Minskin is susceptible to several of the same health issues experienced by those breeds. The genetic disorder responsible for the breed's shortened stature can result in an undersized jaw, thick-looking joints, curved spine, and a bow-legged or knock-kneed posture. The shortened legs make the Minskin more susceptible to feline osteoarthritis.

Munchkins have a higher incidence of lordosis and pectus excavatum.

== See also ==
- Dwarf cat
- List of experimental cat breeds
- List of cat body-type mutations
