= American lynx =

American lynx may refer to:

- American Lynx cat, an experimental breed of short-haired, short-tailed domestic cat; as of 2017 it is recognized only by the Rare & Exotic Feline Registry
- Genus Lynx wild cats in the Americas:
  - Canada lynx (Lynx canadensis), a North American wild cat, ranging from the northern United States, through Canada, to Alaska
  - Bobcat (Lynx rufus), a North American wild cat, ranging from northern Mexico to southern Canada
  - [Genetic Research], Genetic Research, Analyzed DNA from seventeen populations of North American Lynx found that lynx from Wyoming to Alaska share similar genetic profiles to one another. This shows that there were occurrences of extensive breeding and movement between the Canada Lynx and other North American Lynx.
