= Dwarf cat =

Genetic mutation affecting cats

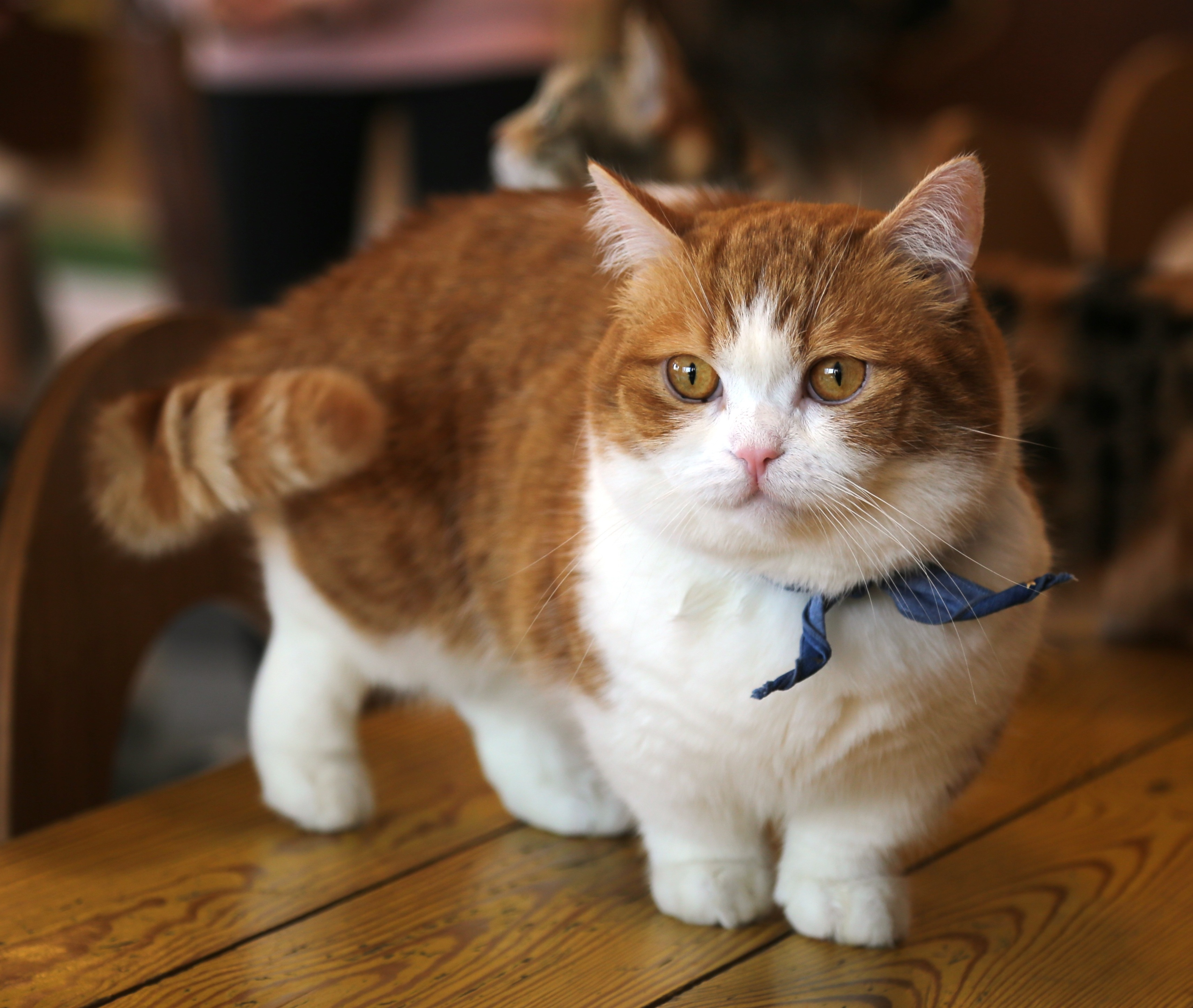
Munchkin cat with thick, short legs

A dwarf cat (sometimes nicknamed a sausage cat) is a domestic cat with dwarfism due to rare genetic mutations that cause a disproportionate feline body. The mutation usually leads to significant health problems. Unlike undersized cats of normal proportions, dwarf cats suffer from the genetic mutations osteochondrodysplasia and achondroplasia (a form of osteochondrodysplasia). These genetic disorders of bone and cartilage are typically manifested as abnormal bone shape, poor growth or lack of growth, bowing of the limbs to the side – front legs are more likely to be affected, and spinal malformations.

The breeding of dwarf cats is prohibited in several countries and states, due to the animal’s welfare concerns. Furthermore, except for TICA, all major cat registries neither recognise, nor allow crossbreeding, with dwarf cats.

== Characteristics ==
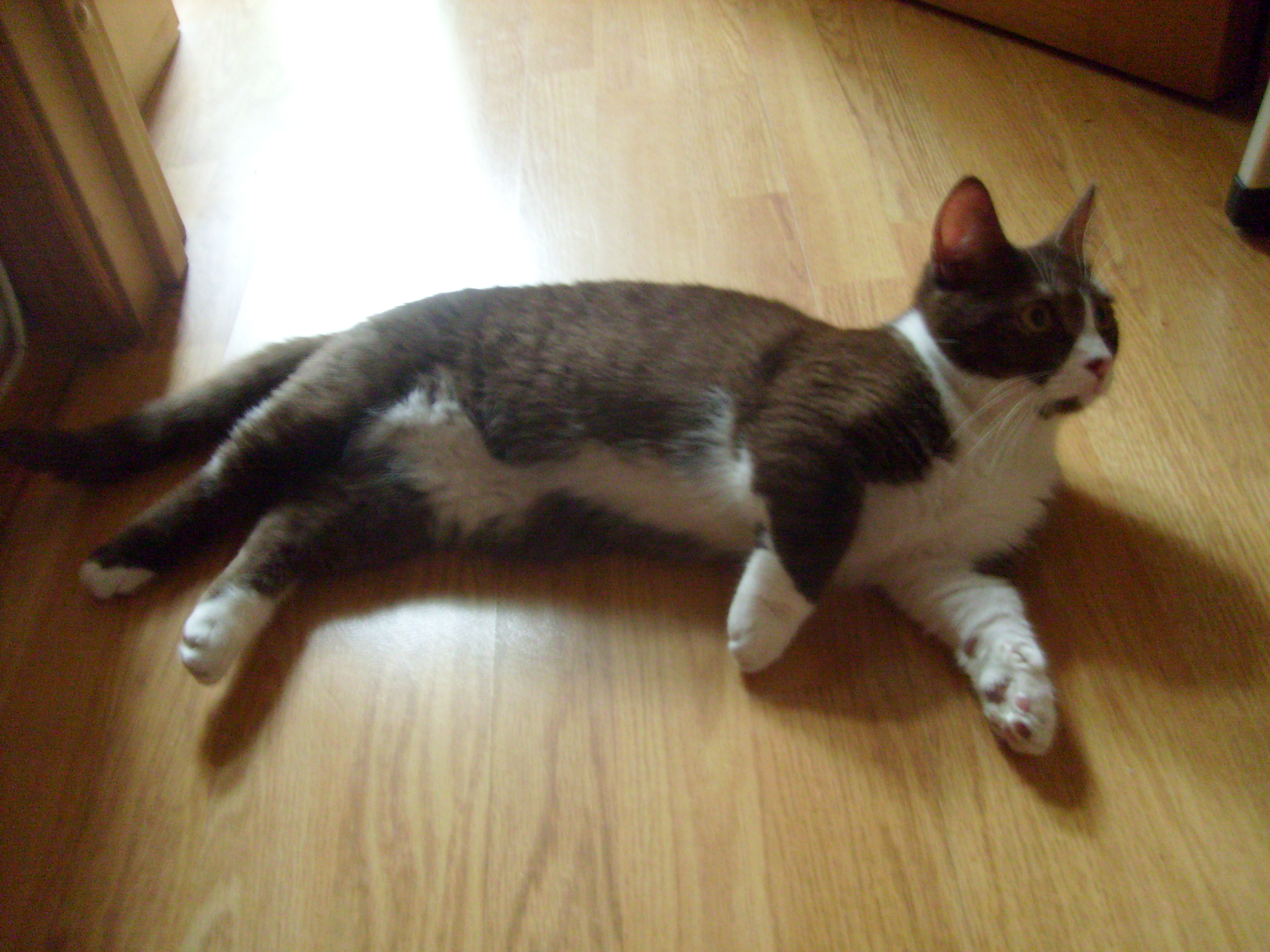
A Munchkin with legs extended

The dwarf cat is recognised by its characteristically short legs, they are chondrodysplastic and have much shorter and thicker legs than the average cat. Because of their health problems and abnormal bone growth, these cats typically lead a shorter life of 12–15 years. Dwarf cats often suffer from spinal disorders, such as lordosis (excessive curvature of the spine) and pectus excavatum (hollowed chest). In regards to behaviour, dwarf cats may be no different from the average cat. They can be playful, curious, and fast.

Cats with dwarfism have become significantly popular, but breeding dwarf cats has been viewed as unethical due to the lifelong health results, resulting in a ban in multiple places. Dwarf cats became famous worldwide due to the social media spread by famous internet cats with dwarfism, such as Grumpy Cat and Lil Bub.

The term "dwarf cat" is incorrectly applied to cats such as Toy and Teacup Persians which, though small, are breeds of normal feline proportions.

== Breeds ==
The Munchkin cat is breed of cat characterised by its short legs. The Munchkin is the original breed of dwarf cats. The International Cat Association (TICA) gave recognition to the Munchkin as a breed in 1994. Minuet cats are longhaired dwarf cats, and the name is often used interchangeably with the Napoleon. The Minuet is a cross between the Persian and the Munchkin. The Munchkin is approximately three inches shorter than the average cat. The deformities can lie anywhere in the front legs, affecting the humerus, radius and ulna, and the back legs, affecting the femur, tibia and fibula.

The Munchkin has grown significantly in popularity, but due to ethical concerns, the breed has been banned from registration in show registries, and is therefore primarily bred in the US. Other proposed breeds like the Skookum and Bambino have not been given recognition, although a Sphynx–Munchkin hybrid, the Minskin, is under study. Four other breeds include the Lambkin and the Kinkalow, the Genetta and the Scottish Kilt.

=== List of dwarf cat breeds ===
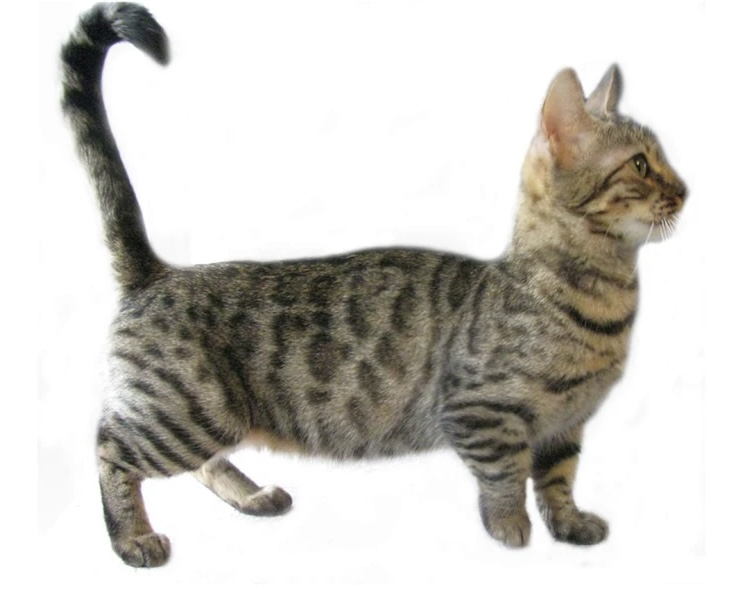
A 4-year-old male Genetta

- Munchkin
- Napoleon or Minuet (Persian × Munchkin)
- Skookum (LaPerm × Munchkin)
- Bambino (Sphynx × Munchkin)
- Minskin (Sphynx × Munchkin)
- Lambkin (Dwarf) (Selkirk Rex × Munchkin)
- Kinkalow (American curl × Munchkin)
- Genetta (Bengal × Munchkin)
- Scottish Kilt (Scottish Fold × Munchkin)

== Breeding ethics and ban ==
=== Cat fancy ===
Other than TICA, all major cat registries and pet associations do not recognise any dwarf cat as a legitimate breed. The animals are excluded from most major pet shows and contests. Largely a phenomenon in the United States, they are not widely accepted outside of that country.

In its registration rules, the Fédération Internationale Féline (FIFe) prohibits breeds based on dwarfism, and specifically mentions the Munchkin as an example of unacceptable manipulation of "genetic disease".

=== Breeding ban ===
In order to protect the animal’s welfare, several countries and states have prohibited breeding of dwarf cats, including the Netherlands (2014), and Victoria (Australia). The Australian Capital Territory (Australia) government consider the Munchkin breed to be "malformed animals" and the deliberate breeding of them "unacceptable" because of the "genetic health problems associated with such breeding". Breeding with a dwarf cat is effectively banned in the European Union under the European Convention for the Protection of Pet Animals.

Munchkins have been strongly condemned in the British magazine Cat World. In the US itself, the ASPCA admonishes its supporters to "stay vigilant" against the small but spreading market.

== Testing ==
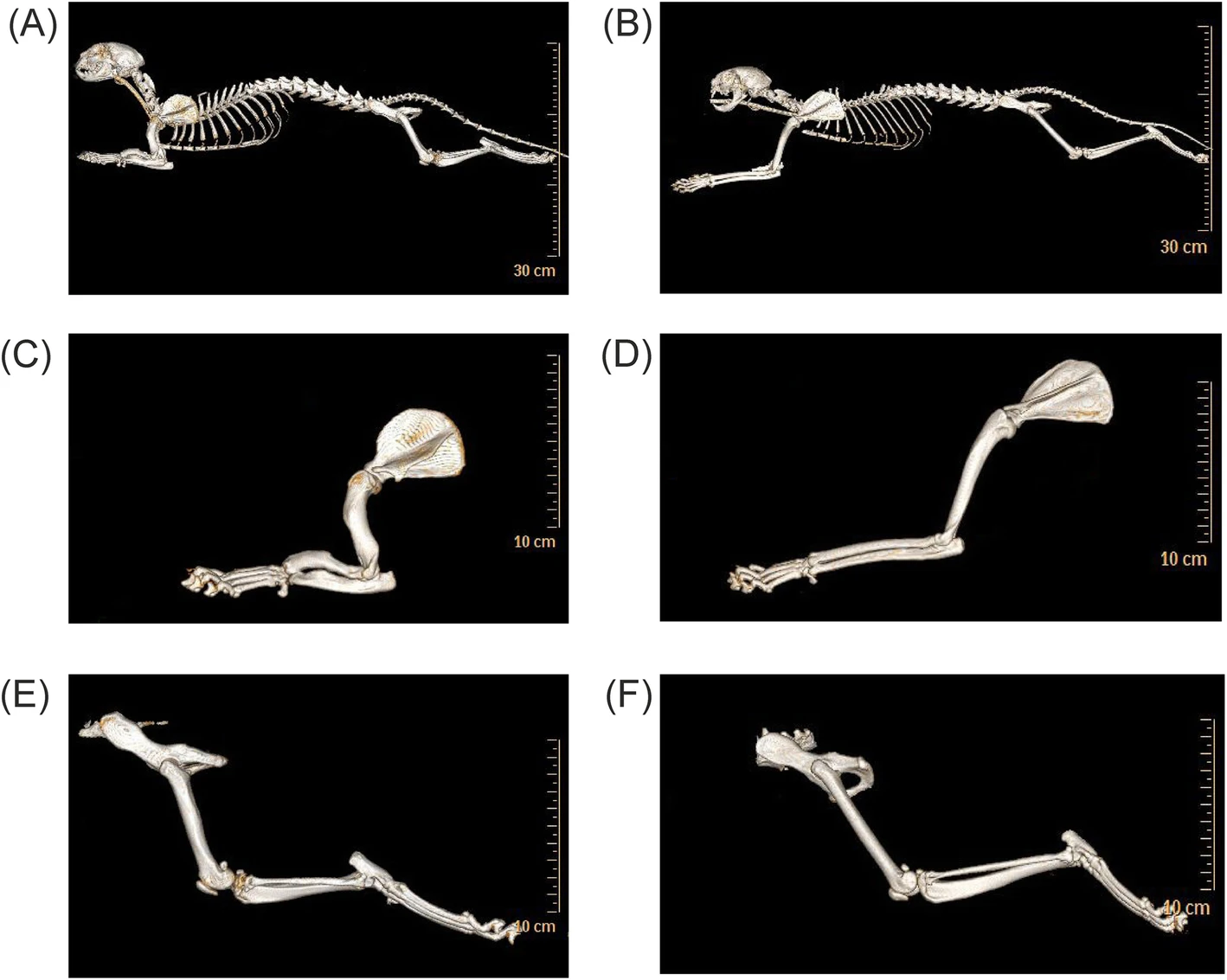
Computed tomography X-ray photograph of a 4-year-old standard Munchkin cat sire and an adult female domestic cat control. Lateral view of a standard Munchkin cat (a, c, e) and a domestic cat (b, d, f). The limbs of the standard Munchkin cat are shortened in relation to the body. The fore limbs of the standard Munchkin cat (c) show a shortening of all distal and proximal long bones and higher diaphyseal diameters, particularly of humerus, compared to the fore limbs of domestic cat (d). The hind limbs (e, f) also show higher diaphyseal diameters, particularly in the femur, as well as a shortening of the long bones.

If a cat is showing signs of feline dwarfism, specific testing can be done to determine if dwarfism is the cause, or if another condition, such as congenital feline hypothyroidism, is causing symptoms similar to feline dwarfism. To determine if a cat has feline dwarfism, X-rays, bone samples, and genetic testing can be done. Genetic testing on cats with feline dwarfism is being utilised in human research as well.

=== Congenital feline hypothyroidism ===
Dwarfism has the potential to be mistaken as congenital feline hypothyroidism. Signs such as disproportionate dwarfism, skeletal abnormalities, and mental disabilities point to both dwarfism and hypothyroidism. Because of this, proper testing can determine whether the cat is showing signs of hypothyroidism or if there is a deeper issue.

A blood test measures the levels of thyroid-stimulating hormone (TSH) in the cat can be performed to rule out feline dwarfism. The test checks the levels of the thyroid hormones thyroxine (T4) and triiodothyronine (T3) and will determine if the cat has hypothyroidism, or if further testing needs to be done to come to a different diagnosis.

In 2018, a study was performed on a 10-month-old kitten showing signs of disproportionate dwarfism. Testing was performed on its TSH, which confirmed hypothyroidism in the kitten. The kitten was prescribed thyroid hormone supplementation and after 22 months, presented as an average, healthy cat. Once diagnosed, thyroid hormone supplementation should start as early as possible.

== See also ==
- List of cat body-type mutations
