= Munchkin cat =

Breed of cat

Munchkin
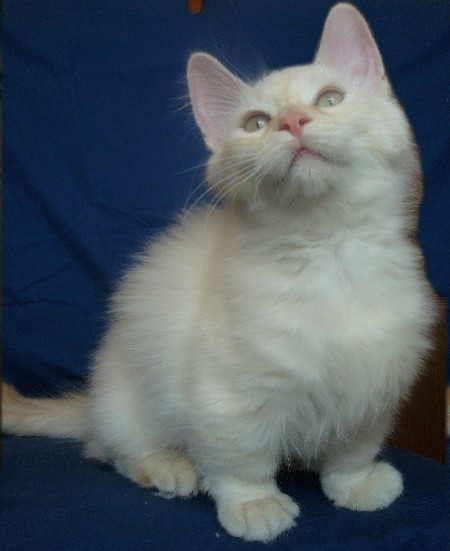
- An adolescent Munchkin kitten
- Origin: United States

Breed standards
- TICA: standard
- Other: https://wcf.de/pdf-en/breed/MNS_en_2021-12-08.pdf

The Munchkin is a breed of cat characterized by its very short legs, which are caused by a genetic mutation. Compared to many other cat breeds, it is a relatively new breed, documented since 1940s and officially introduced in 1991. The Munchkin is considered to be the original breed of dwarf cat, the breeding of which is prohibited in several countries and states, due to concerns for the animals' welfare.

Much controversy erupted over the breed when it was recognized by The International Cat Association (TICA) in 1997 with critics voicing concerns over health and mobility issues. Many pedigree cat associations around the world have refused to recognize the Munchkin cat due to the welfare of the breed, including the Governing Council of the Cat Fancy (GCCF). Breeding of Munchkin cats is prohibited by law in several countries due to these genetic health concerns. The Fédération Internationale Féline prohibits breeds based on dwarfism, and specifically mentions the Munchkin as an example of unacceptable manipulation of "genetic disease".

The name derives from writer L. Frank Baum's diminutive inhabitants of Munchkin Country, originating in the 1900 novel, The Wonderful Wizard of Oz.

== History ==
=== Breed creation ===
Short-legged cats have been documented a number of times around the world since the 1940s. A British veterinary report in 1944 noted four generations of short-legged cats which were similar to normal cats except for the length of the legs. This line disappeared during the Second World War but other short-legged cats were spotted in Russia during 1956 and the United States in the 1970s.

In 1983, Sandra Hochenedel, a music teacher in Rayville, Louisiana, found two pregnant cats who had been chased under a truck by a dog. She kept one of the cats and named her Blackberry and half of her kittens were born short-legged. Hochenedel gave a short-legged male kitten from one of Blackberry's litters to a friend, Kay LaFrance of Monroe, Louisiana, and she named the kitten Toulouse. It is from Blackberry and Toulouse's litter that today's Munchkin breed is descended.

=== Registry history ===
The Munchkin cat was first introduced to the general public in 1991 via a national network televised cat show held by The International Cat Association (TICA) in Madison Square Garden, New York City. However, the breed would not be officially recognized at that time. Critics predicted that the breed would develop back, hip and leg problems similar to those that plague some dachshunds. For many years, the Munchkin breed was not accepted in feline competitions due to the controversial breeding. Solveig Pflueger, a show judge, geneticist, and chairperson of TICA's Genetics Committee was a strong advocate for the official recognition of the breed. Pflueger was also a breeder of Munchkin cats herself, having been initially sent two cats from Hochenedel. Amidst much controversy, the Munchkin was proposed as a new breed by foundation breeders Laurie Bobskill and Robert Bobskill of Massachusetts and accepted by TICA into its new breed development program in September 1994. Veteran show judge Katherine Crawford resigned in protest, calling the breed an affront to breeders with ethics. Currently, the only registries that fully recognize the breed are TICA, the Southern Africa Cat Council, the Australian Cat Federation, the World Cat Federation, and Catz Incorporated (New Zealand). There is controversy among breeders of pedigree cats as to what genetic mutations are abnormal and potentially disadvantageous to the cat. Katie Lisnik, director of cat protection and policy at the Humane Society of the United States, has said: "Breeding animals for exaggerated physical characteristics, particularly when it compromises overall health, is irresponsible". Several cat registries do not recognize the Munchkin: Fédération Internationale Féline, which refuses to recognize what they consider a breed based on a "genetic disease", achondroplasia. The Governing Council of the Cat Fancy likewise refuses to recognize the breed, considering this breed and others like it to be "unacceptable" because they are based on an "abnormal structure or development". The breed is also not recognized by the Cat Fanciers' Association.

== Welfare concern ==
=== Breeding bans ===
Several countries and territories have prohibited breeding with Munchkins, including the European Union, which prohibits the breeding of dwarf cats under the broader European Convention for the Protection of Pet Animals. The Netherlands (2014) prohibits breeding of all animals with genetic defects. Victoria (Australia) and the Australian Capital Territory government considers the Munchkin breed to be malformed animals and the deliberate breeding of them unacceptable because of the "genetic health problems associated with such breeding".

Munchkin cross-breeds like the bambino have also been subject to legal restrictions.

== Characteristics ==
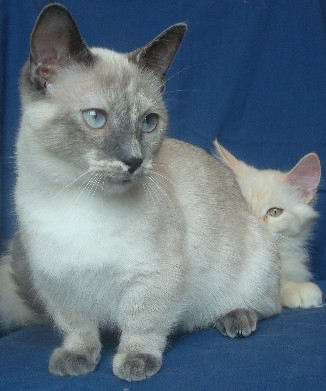
Munchkin kitten, 7 months old

Some sources state that the shortness of their legs does not interfere with their running and leaping abilities, while others state their ability to jump is limited by their condition.

The Munchkin has similar characteristics to normal domestic cats, due to their frequent use as outcrosses. It is a small to medium-sized cat with a moderate body type and medium-plush coat. Male Munchkins typically weigh between 6 and 9 pounds (2.7 and 4.1 kg) and are usually larger than female Munchkins, which typically weigh between 4 and 8 pounds (1.8 and 3.6 kg). The hind legs can be slightly longer than the front which creates a slight rise from the shoulder to the rump. The legs of the Munchkin may be slightly bowed, although excessive bowing is a disqualification in the show ring. Cow-hocked legs are also penalized.

The Munchkin comes in all coat colors and patterns. It also comes in a long-haired variety, which is shown in a separate Munchkin Longhair category. The short-haired variety has a medium-plush coat while the long-haired has a semi-long silky coat. TICA rules for outcrossing allows the use of any domestic cat that does not already belong to a recognized breed. Similarity to other breeds is grounds for disqualification. Non-standard Munchkins are not allowed to be shown.

In 2014, Lilieput, a Munchkin cat from Napa, California, was named the shortest statured living cat in the world by Guinness World Records. She stands 5.25 inches (133 mm) tall.

== Health ==
The mutation that causes the shortened legs in the Munchkin is a chondrodysplasia. The Munchkin cat has an increased incidence of lordosis and pectus excavatum (hollowed chest).

Munchkin cats are known to be at a higher risk (than other feline breeds) for severe osteoarthritis because the shorter limbs affect their activity levels and behavior. Diagnosis of osteoarthritis and the assessment of its severity for a cat may require radiography.

Many pedigree cat associations around the world have refused to recognize the Munchkin cat due to health concerns.

== Genetics ==
The gene causing chondrodysplasia in the Munchkin cat is caused by an autosomal dominant mutation. Only heterozygous cats are viable.

Punnett squares, in which the M represents the dominant Munchkin gene and the m represents the recessive normal gene, may be used to illustrate the chances of a particular mating resulting in a short-legged cat.

Mating two standard Munchkins
	M	m
M	MM	Mm
m	Mm	mm

For each kitten conceived from this mating, there is a 25% chance it will fail to gestate, a 25% chance it will be normal, and a 50% chance it will be short-legged.

Mating a standard or non-standard Munchkin with a normal cat
	M	m
m	Mm	mm
m	Mm	mm

For each kitten conceived from this mating, there is a 0% chance it will be homozygous for the Munchkin gene, a 50% chance it will be normal non-standard (long legged) Munchkin, and a 50% chance it will be a standard (short legged) Munchkin.

== Derived breeds ==
The popularity of the Munchkin has led to the crossbreeding of the Munchkin with other breeds, to try to establish new, derived breeds, most of which are unrecognised by any major registry. Some named experimental crossbreeds (all of them dwarf cats) include:

- Bambino, a mostly-hairless dwarf cat, from a cross of the Munchkin and the Sphynx breeds. Recognised by the Rare and Exotic Feline Registry (REFR). In 2019, the Netherlands Food and Consumer Product Safety Authority ordered a couple to stop breeding the Bambino due to welfare concerns.
- Dwelf, a cross between the Munchkin, Sphynx, and American Curl, with the defining traits of all three breeds: shortened legs, hairlessness, and curled ears. It is recognised by REFR.
- Genetta, a cross between Munchkin, Bengal, and sometimes Ocicat breeds, with a spotted, striped, or marbled coat. It is recognised by REFR.
- Kinkalow, a cross between Munchkin and American Curl, with short legs and curled ears. It is recognised by REFR.
- Lambkin (or Nanus Rex), a cross between Munchkin and Selkirk Rex, with short legs and a curly coat. It is recognised by the REFR.
- Minskin, a breed developed from Munchkin, Burmese, Sphynx, and Devon Rex stock, with short legs, hairlessness or a very short coat, and point coloration. It is recognised by REFR, and preliminaily by The International Cat Association (TICA) since 2018.
- Minuet (or Napoleon), a cross between Munchkin and Persian (or sometimes Himalayan or Exotic Shorthair), with short legs and brachycephaly ("peke-face", characteristic of the latter breeds). Coat length and coloration depend on the bloodline. It is a fully recognized breed by TICA (experimentally since 2001). It is still recognized under the Napoleon name by REFR.
- Skookum (or LaMerm), a cross between Munchkin and LaPerm, with the short legs of the former and curly coat of the latter. It is recognised by the REFR.

== See also ==
- Dwarf cat
- Selective breeding
- Squitten
- Cat body type genetic mutations
- Scottish Fold, a variety of cat with a gene causing osteochondrodysplasia rather than achondroplasia.
- Dachshund, a similar dog breed with shorter legs
- Welsh Corgi, two dog breeds with similar stature and health issues.
