= Feline corneal sequestrum =

Eye disease of cats

Feline corneal sequestrum (also known as feline corneal necrosis) is the development of dark areas of dead tissue in the cornea of domestic cats. This disease is painful to the cat, although it develops slowly over a longer period of time. Cats will usually demonstrate teary eye(s), squinting or closing of the eye(s), and covering of the third eyelid.

== Presentation ==
The affected area of the cornea develops a brown discoloration. The area surrounding the sequestrum may have superficial ulceration. The corneal sequestrum is painful, and the cat may show this by squinting or closing the eye (blepharospasm).

== Causes ==
The cause of corneal sequestra is unknown. A sequestrum in the cornea usually develops following long term (chronic) ulceration of the cornea. Feline viral rhinotracheitis (previously known as Feline herpes virus) is often found in cats with a corneal sequestrum.

== Prevention ==
As the cause is not known, it is difficult to know what steps to take to prevent this from occurring. However, keep the eyes clean and seek veterinary attention if an eye is cut, scratched or irritated.

== Treatment ==
Lubricating eye drops are usually given in the first instance of feline corneal sequestra, yet if the eye continues to irritate the cat or becomes worse, surgical removal is usually required. Once the removal of the corneal sequestrum is complete, cats will usually remain on lubricating eye drops for the rest of their lives. The disease often reoccurs in cats who have already experienced this problem.

== Epidemiology ==
Any breed of cat may develop a corneal sequestrum, although Persians, Exotic Shorthairs and Himalayans may be more susceptible to developing sequestra than other breeds of cat.
