= List of cat body-type mutations =

Cats, like all living organisms, occasionally have mutations that affect their body type. Sometimes, these mutations are striking enough that humans select for and perpetuate them. However, in relatively small or isolated feral cat populations the mutations can also spread naturally without human intervention, for example on islands. Cat breeders exploit the naturally occurring mutations by selectively breeding them in a small gene pool, resulting in the creation of new cat breeds with unusual physical characteristics. The term designer cat is often used to refer to these cat breeds. This is not always in the best interests of the cat, as many of these mutations are harmful; some are even lethal in their homozygous form. To protect the animal's welfare it is illegal in several countries or states to breed with parent cats that bear certain of these hypertype mutations.

This article gives a selection of cat body type mutant alleles and the associated mutations with a brief description.

== Tail types ==
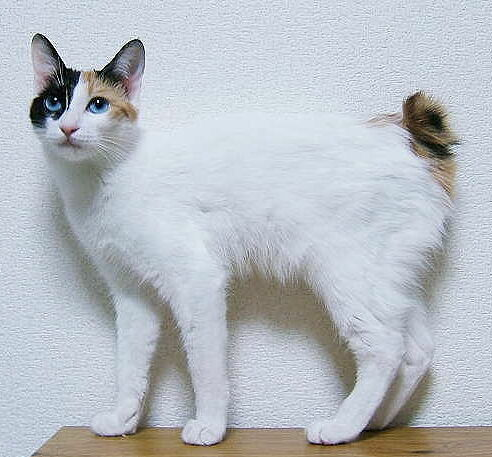
A cat with the Japanese Bobtail mutation

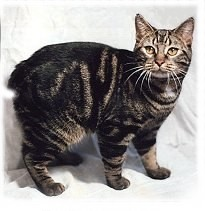
A Manx cat

Jb
Japanese Bobtail gene (autosomal dominant). Cats homozygous and heterozygous for this gene display shortened and kinked tails. Cats homozygous for the gene tend to have shorter, more kinked tails. This can be distinguished phenotypically from the Manx cat mutation by the presence of kinking in the tail, often forming what looks like a knot at the distal end of the tail. Unlike the Manx tailless gene, there are no associated skeletal disorders and the gene is not associated with lethality.
M
Manx tailless gene (autosomal dominant with high penetrance). Cats with the homozygous genotype (MM) die before birth, and stillborn kittens show gross abnormalities of the central nervous system. Cats with the heterozygous genotype (Mm) show severely shortened tail length, ranging from taillessness to a partial, stumpy tail. Some Manx cats die before 12 months old and exhibit skeletal and organ defects. Because it was discovered in naturally occurring populations of cats, the Manx gene could confer some kind of selective advantage to the cats, or it may simply be an example of the founder effect. The trait also occurred and died out in Cornwall (peninsular England), but persisted in the Isle of Man population where inbreeding was very common due to isolation.

Shortened tails, most of which are indistinguishable from the Japanese Bobtail or the variably expressed Manx mutation, may occur sporadically in any cat breed or mixed-breed population. However, some may be novel mutations that have not been investigated. There are multiple types of curly-tailed (ringtail) cats whose tails loop over the back or form tight corkscrews. One such mutation has been developed into the American Ringtail, but others have been regarded as curiosities and not perpetuated. The gene(s) responsible have not been fully investigated. However, a US research study at the UC Davis and University of Missouri is under way under the guidance of Leslie A. Lyons.

== Dwarfism & miniature ==
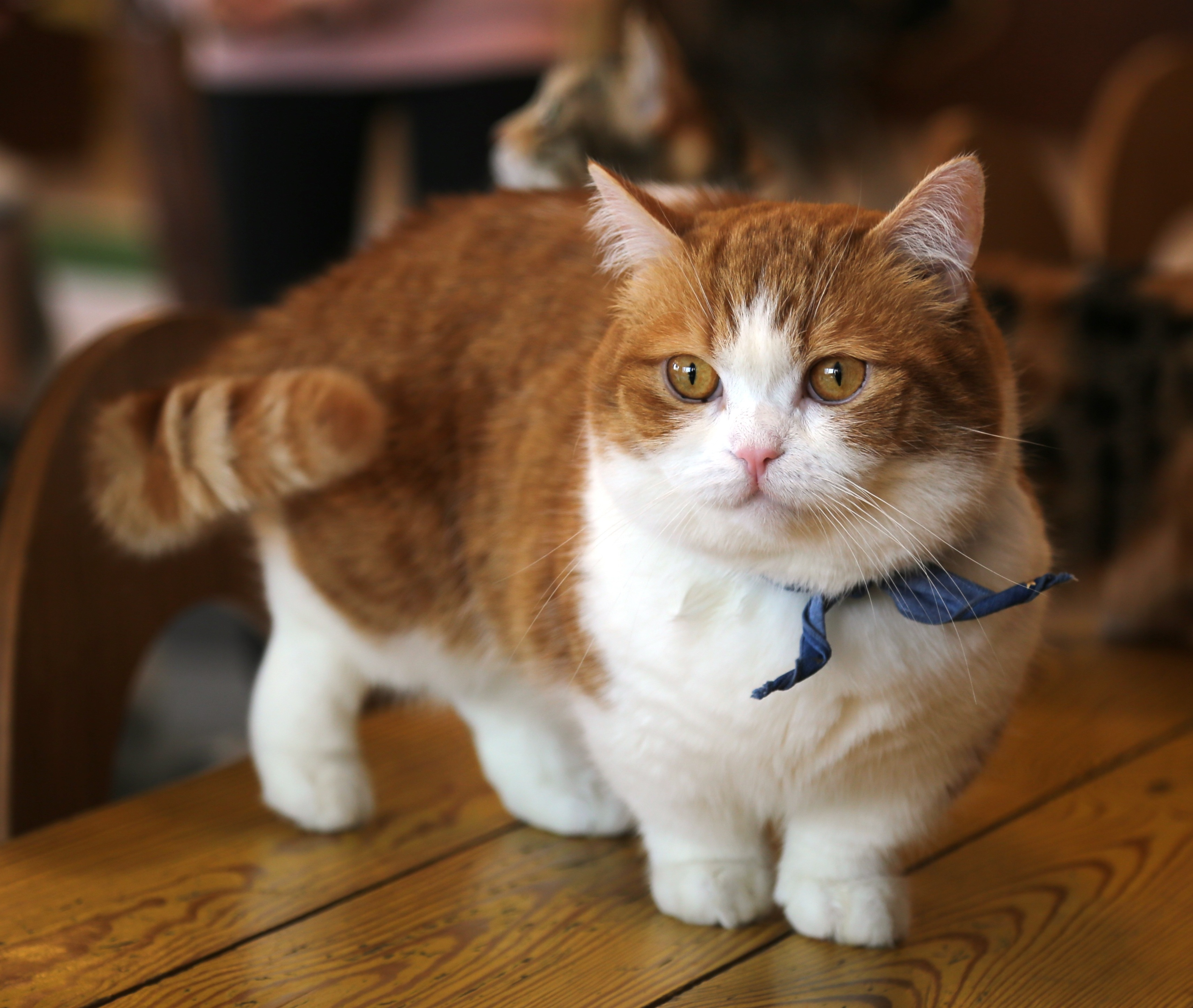
Munchkin cat with thick, short legs

Mk
Munchkin or dwarf cat gene (dominant). Cats heterozygous for this gene (Mkmk) have shortened and thickened legs, because this gene causes dwarfism in cats. Cats with this mutation have lived naturally in feral populations worldwide. However, cats with this gene are also the basis for several intentionally selected breeds of dwarf cat. The Munchkin is the first created dwarf cat breed, which was used as a foundation stock for other "spin-off" breeds, such as the Minskin, Minuet or Napoleon, Bambino, Lambkin Dwarf, Kinkalow, Skookum, Genetta, and Scottish Kilt. The homozygous form (MkMk) may be lethal as litter sizes are smaller than average. Unlike undersized cats of normal proportions (such as Toy and Teacup Persians), dwarf cats suffer from a genetic mutation called pseudoachondroplasia (dwarfism without enlarged heads), a type of osteochondrodysplasia (bone and cartilage disorder). These genetic disorders of bone and cartilage are typically manifested as abnormal bone shape, poor growth or lack of growth, bowing of the limbs to the side – front legs are more likely to be affected, and spinal malformations. The disorder leaves the cat with a full-size body, but disproportionately short and thick legs. Dwarf cats often suffer from spinal disorders, such as lordosis (excessive curvature of the spine) and pectus excavatum (hollowed chest). As with human dwarfism, there are still a lot of unknown mysteries in the science behind feline dwarfism. It is found that achondroplasia in humans is the result of the FGFR3 gene.

Miniature-sized
A germ cell mutation occurred in a male Persian cat called Treker in 1995, resulting in diminutive, but healthy and normally-proportioned, offspring. Treker and the females with which he was mated were normally sized, but 75% of the kittens sired by Treker inherited diminutive stature, but of normal proportions. The gene was found to be dominant and the diminutive offspring were sold as teacup or toy Persians. Toy and Teacup Persians are a separate breed and not all cats advertised under those names result from Treker's dominant mutation. Most teacup and toy size Persian kittens raised now are descendants from Silver and Golden colour division to reduce cat size and are in no way related to Treker.

== Paws ==
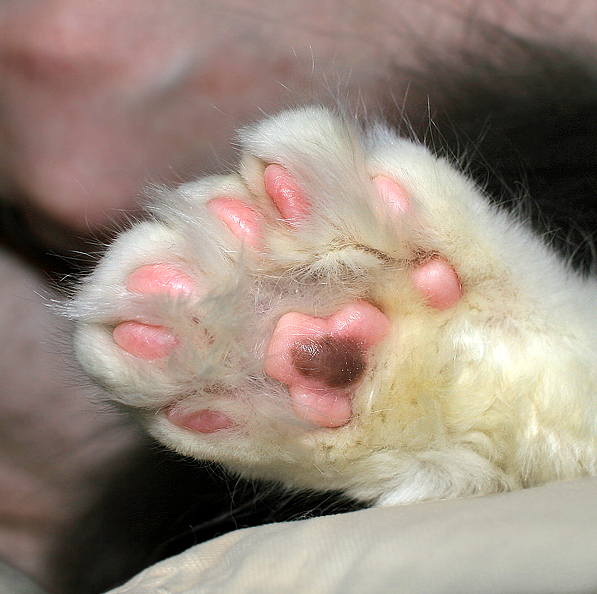
Left rear paw of a Maine Coon polydactyl kitten (Hw mutation)

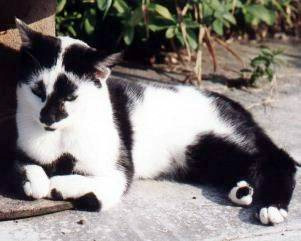
Radial hypoplasia of the forelimbs is typically associated with post-axial polydactyly

Sh
Split Foot gene (Syndactyly). A dominant gene that reduces the number of toes resulting in a "lobster-claw" appearance. This is considered an undesirable mutation.
Polydactyly
There are probably many genes, both dominant and recessive, that cause polydactyly in cats. Most cases of polydactyly in cats are perfectly harmless and affect only the digits (pre-axial), but the more rare cases involving bones of wrist and limb (post-axial) cause debilitating deformities.Polydactyl cats are relatively common in southwest Britain, Norway, Sweden, and the eastern coast of the United States and Canada, and some parts of Asia. Sailors thought they were lucky. Various folktales and dubious assumptions about polydactyl cats include that they are superior rodent hunters, that they have better balance on ships in stormy weather, that their paws are natural snowshoes, and that the opposable thumbs (in the thumb-cat form of polydactyly) give them a survival advantage.
Hw
"Hemingway cat" polydactyly, but actually referring to the Maine Coon polydactyl genotype. The Hw mutant affects the regulation of sonic hedgehog protein, inducing the formation of supernumerary digits, usually on the forelegs. Typically, these digits are small but fully formed, and function normally. Ernest Hemingway collected polydactyl cats, and the descendants of his pets may still be found at the Ernest Hemingway House in Key West, USA.
Pd
Thumb-cat polydactyly gene. The Pd gene (dominant with incomplete penetrance) causes a benign, pre-axial form of polydactyly where one or more extra toes occur near the dew claw. Often, the dew claw is converted into a thumb. There are occasional problems, such as fused claws or claws facing in the wrong direction, but, generally, this form of polydactyly is harmless.
RH gene
The "hamburger-feet" or "patty-feet" polydactyly is associated with the gene for radial hypoplasia (RH), a shortening and twisting of the lower arm bones and malformations of the wrist. They move like a ferret and they tend to sit like a squirrel or kangaroo and are colloquially known as squittens. In some RH cats, the forelegs are twisted with the long bones either severely shortened or absent. Mild RH can cause the post-axial form of polydactyly – enlarged paws, extra three-jointed toes on the outer, little-toe side of the paws, and no thumb. X-rays can determine the structure of the extra toes and whether the cat has the gene for RH. Cats with severe RH have unusually short front legs. The exact cause of these congenital disorders remains unclear, but evidence suggests a genetic basis. For this reason, breeding affected animals is not recommended. Under the European Convention for the Protection of Pet Animals deliberate breeding of these cats is effectively banned in the European Union for two reasons, first that it falls under hypertyping (intentional breeding of extreme characteristics), and secondly that the position of the legs is abnormal. In a scandal in the late 1990s, an experimental breeder in Texas, USA, tried to perpetuate this deformity as the "Twisty Cat" breed. All polydactyl cats are banned from German cat shows, possibly because of confusion with the impairing form of polydactyly associated with RH.

== Ear types ==
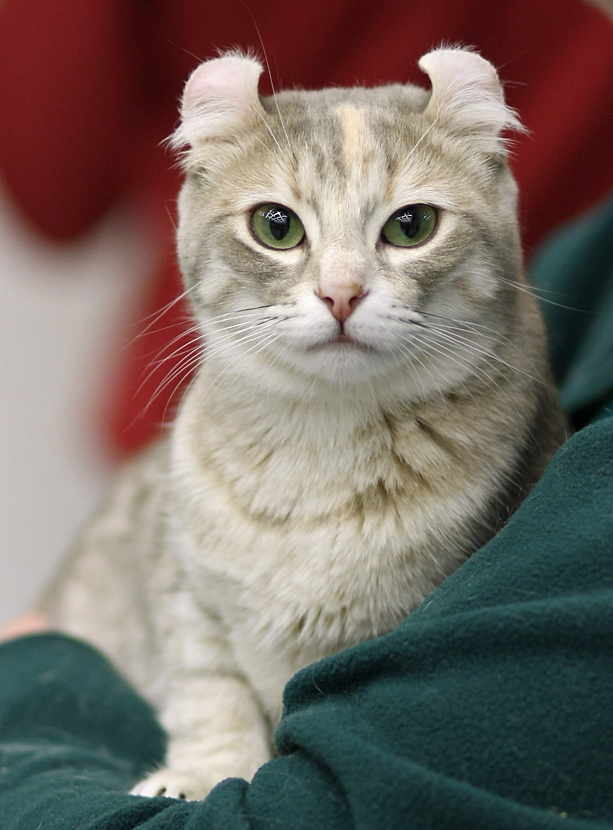
American curl cat with curled ears.

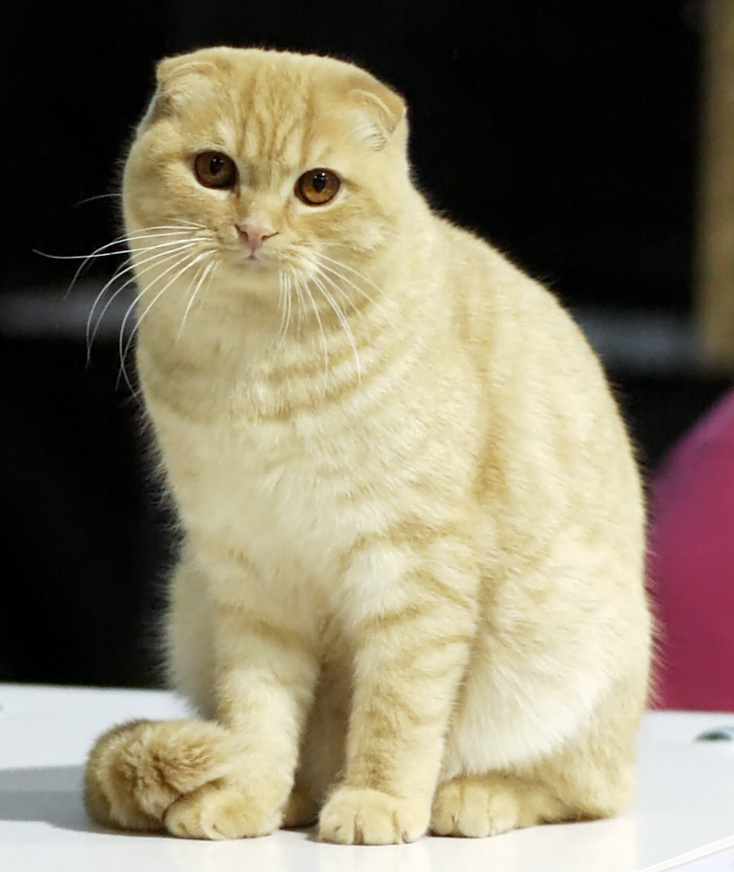
Scottish Fold cat with folded ears.

Cu
American Curl gene (dominant). Cats with this gene have ears that start out normal, but gradually curl backwards. So far, no major harmful defects have been associated with this gene, however, due to the more exposed inner ear regular cleaning is required to prevent infection. Curled ears have also been observed in free-roaming cats in the Greek islands and in a cat in Australia.
Australian Curl
a curl-eared mutation occurred in a female stray cat in Australia, but was not inherited by her offspring. When the original cat became ill, necessitating spaying, it was impossible to test-mate her sons back to her to identify a possibly recessive curled-ear mutation.
Fd
Scottish Fold gene (dominant with incomplete penetrance). Cats with this gene have ears that curl forward. There are different degrees of folding, and more genes may be involved in the expression of the Fd gene. This gene is associated with bone and cartilage defects such as thickened tail and swollen feet. The homozygous form (FdFd) causes severe osteochondrodysplasia. Because of this, many breeders only breed folds to "straights" (non-folds) to avoid homozygous folds. However, heterozygous folds may also develop osteochondrodysplasia of lesser severity.
Sumxu or Chinese Lop-Eared Cat
extinct Chinese Lop-eared cat breed reported between 1700 and 1938 around Peking, most descriptions are based on a specimen in a German museum. The mode of inheritance of its pendulous ears is not known (the name Sumxu results from mistranslations and actually refers to a variety of marten).
Four ears
a recessive mutation that produced four pinnae or ear flaps (the additional pinnae did not lead to additional ear canals and organs of hearing). In a group of four-eared cats studied in 1957, in addition to duplicated ears, the eyes were reduced in size, the jaw was slightly undershot and the cats were relatively inactive and lethargic. Researchers believed that the functioning of the brain was affected. Breeding data indicated it was most often lethal with kittens dying in utero. The majority of recently reported four-eared cats have been healthy with various ear configurations suggesting other genes were involved or developmental abnormalities rather than hereditary factors.
Rounded ears
a rounded ears mutation occurred in a cat in Italy and is being assessed for breed potential. A similar mutation occurred among free-roaming cats in Texas, USA, but died out. The ears have a rounded, rather than pointed, shape.

== Hairlessness ==
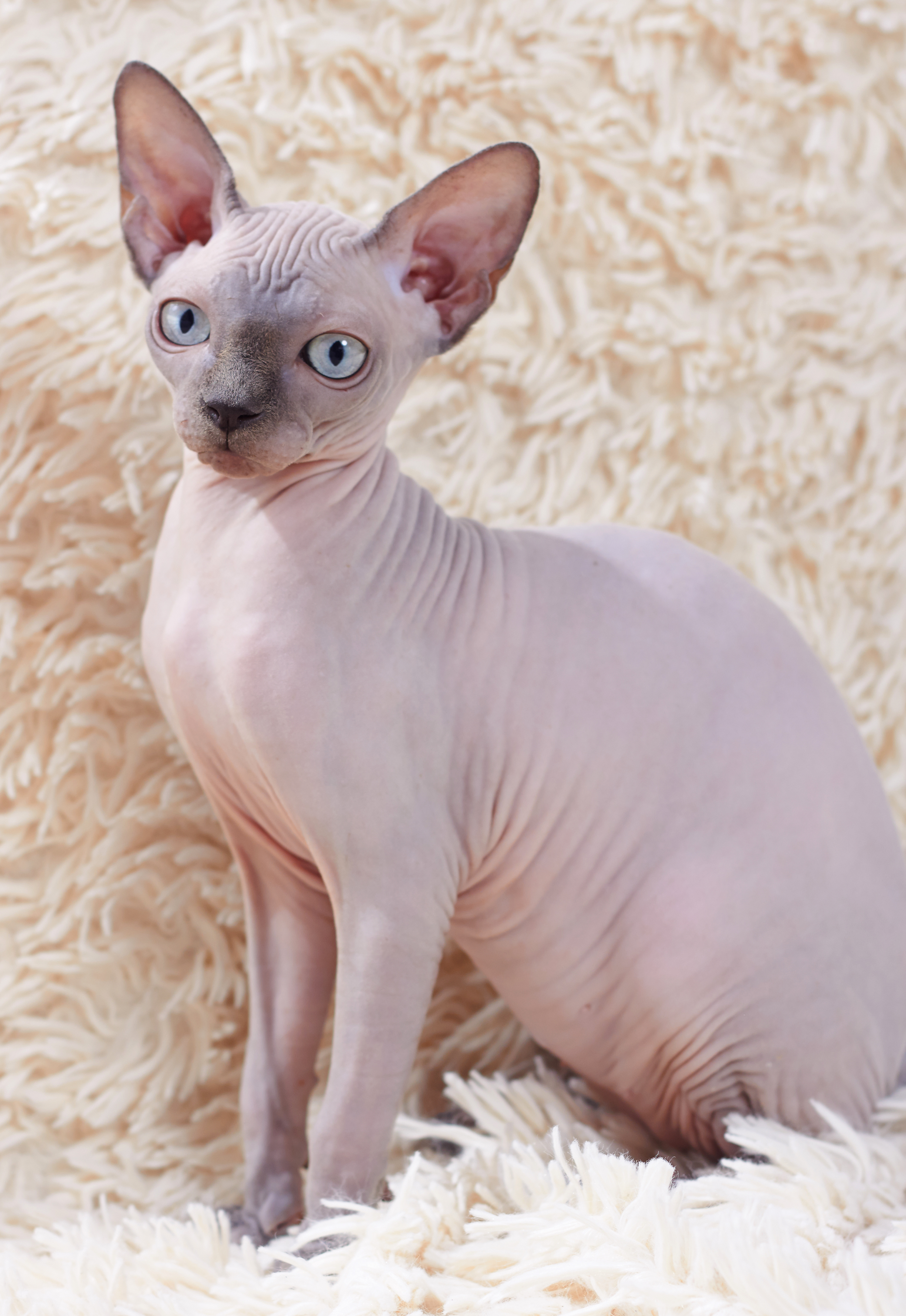
Hairless Sphynx cat.

Sphynx cat
a breed of cat known for its lack of fur. Hairlessness in cats is a naturally occurring genetic mutation and the Sphynx was developed through selective breeding starting in the 1960s. This characteristic hairlessness is caused by a recessive mutation in the keratin 71 gene. Recently crossed experimental hairless cat breeds related to the Sphynx are the Bambino, Dwelf and Elf, which all bear the same hairless genetic mutation.
Donskoy
or Don Sphynx, is another hairless cat, however not related to the Sphynx, and its hairlessness is caused by a dominant instead of recessive mutation. The Peterbald is related to the Donskoy and bears the same dominant hairless mutation.

== Breeding ethics and ban of designer cats ==
Many of the major cat registries do not allow the registry and breeding of cat breeds which bear certain of these genetic mutations, nor recognise them, due to concerns about the animal's welfare.

Breeding with parent animals that bear hypertype mutations is effectively banned in the European Union under the European Convention for the Protection of Pet Animals:

Any person who selects a pet animal for breeding shall be responsible for having regard to the anatomical, physiological and behavioural characteristics which are likely to put at risk the health and welfare of either the offspring or the female parent.

— Chapter II - Article 5

Since 2014, breeding parent cats with genetic mutations or physical abnormalities that cause health or welfare issues in their offspring has been illegal in the Netherlands. Examples of these genetic mutations and physical abnormalities that cause health or welfare issues are dwarfism, the lack of protecting fur in hairless cats, and fold-eared cats. As of January 2026, owning fold-eared and hairless cats is also prohibited in the country.

Furthermore, several countries or states have prohibited breeding with certain of the genetic mutations in cats, including Scotland, Victoria and the Australian Capital Territory (Australia), Austria, and Flanders (Belgium).
