= List of experimental cat breeds =

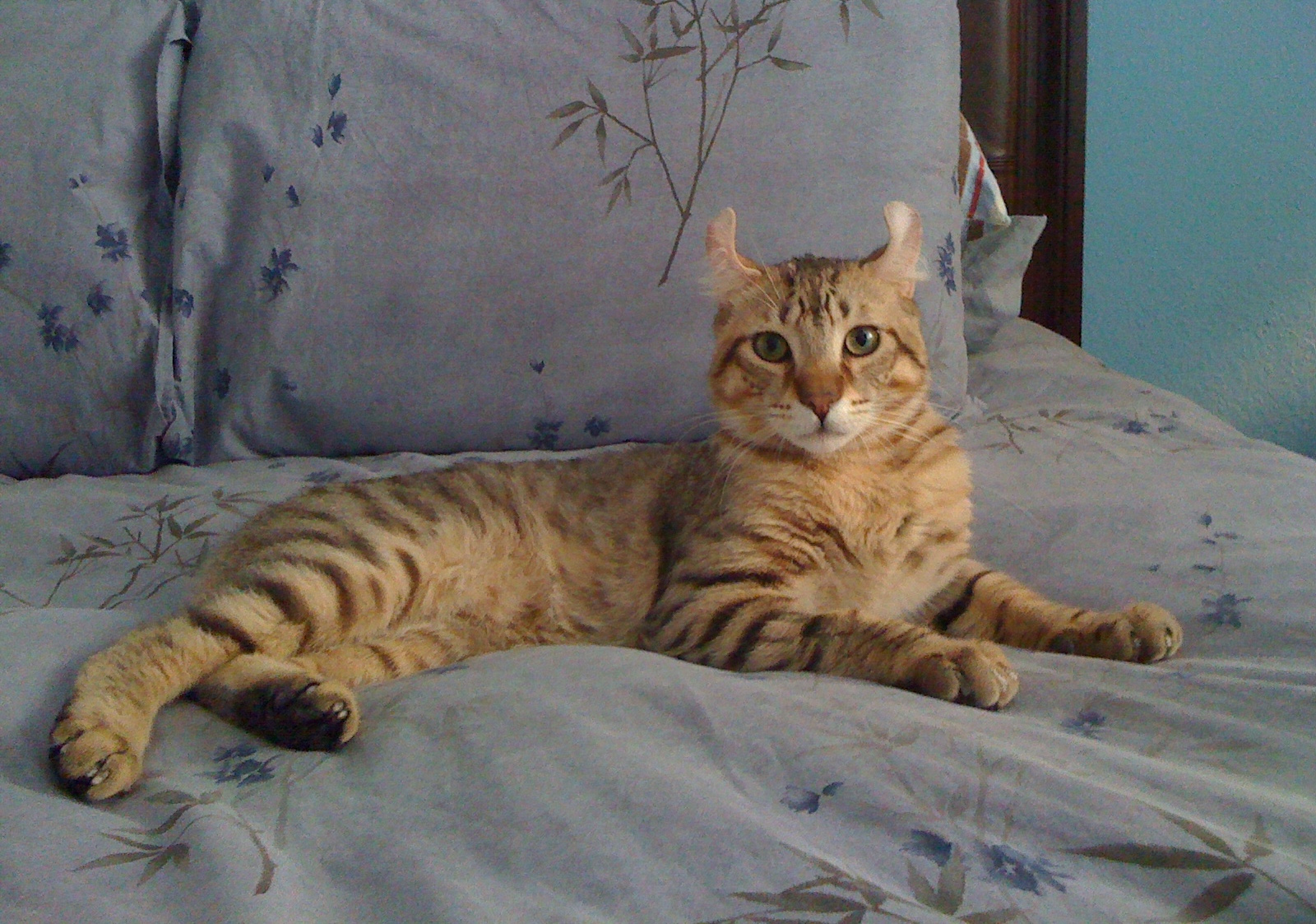
The Highlander cat is a deliberate cross between the Desert Lynx and the Jungle Curl breeds

The following is a list of experimental cat breeds and crossbreeds that do not have the recognition of any major national or international cat registries, such as The International Cat Association (TICA) in the US, Europe, and Australasia; the Governing Council of the Cat Fancy (GCCF) in the UK, the Fédération Internationale Féline (FiFE) in continental Europe, the Cat Fanciers' Association (CFA) in North America, or the more recent World Cat Federation based in Germany. Such a breed may be recognized by one of the smaller cat registries. Smaller registries include the Rare and Exotic Feline Registry (REFR), and others. This list only includes breeds recognized by at least one extant, national or international, multi-breed registry.

Breeders of some minority breeds actively seek major recognition for them, but have yet to receive it. For example, in regions where the formal cat fancy is in its infancy, naturally occurring native varieties – landraces – can be classified as minority breeds when attempts at selective breeding have begun to produce a formal natural breed with consistent traits, as is ongoing with the Aegean and Van cats. Other minority breeds are bred for private reasons and inadvertently attract an informal following. Minority breeds may be recognized by some registries, or none at all; recognition can be refused for a variety of reasons (including over-similarity to an existing breed, medical problems being statistically linked to the breed, and others). Some may have "preliminary" status in one or more registries, with experimental conformation standards already in place, but turn out to be non-viable over the longer term.

Discrepancies between breed names can often cause confusion; occasionally the name adopted by one registry is used elsewhere for an entirely different breed; for example, the breed known in Australia as "Burmilla Longhair" is analogous to the "Asian Semi-longhair" in Britain (also called the "Tiffanie"), but Australia already has a quite different breed known as the "Australian Tiffanie" and both are different from the American "Tiffany" (also known as the Chantilly-Tiffany). Such conflicts are decreasing due to better communication between registries, largely facilitated by the Internet and by the World Cat Congress.

== Aegean ==
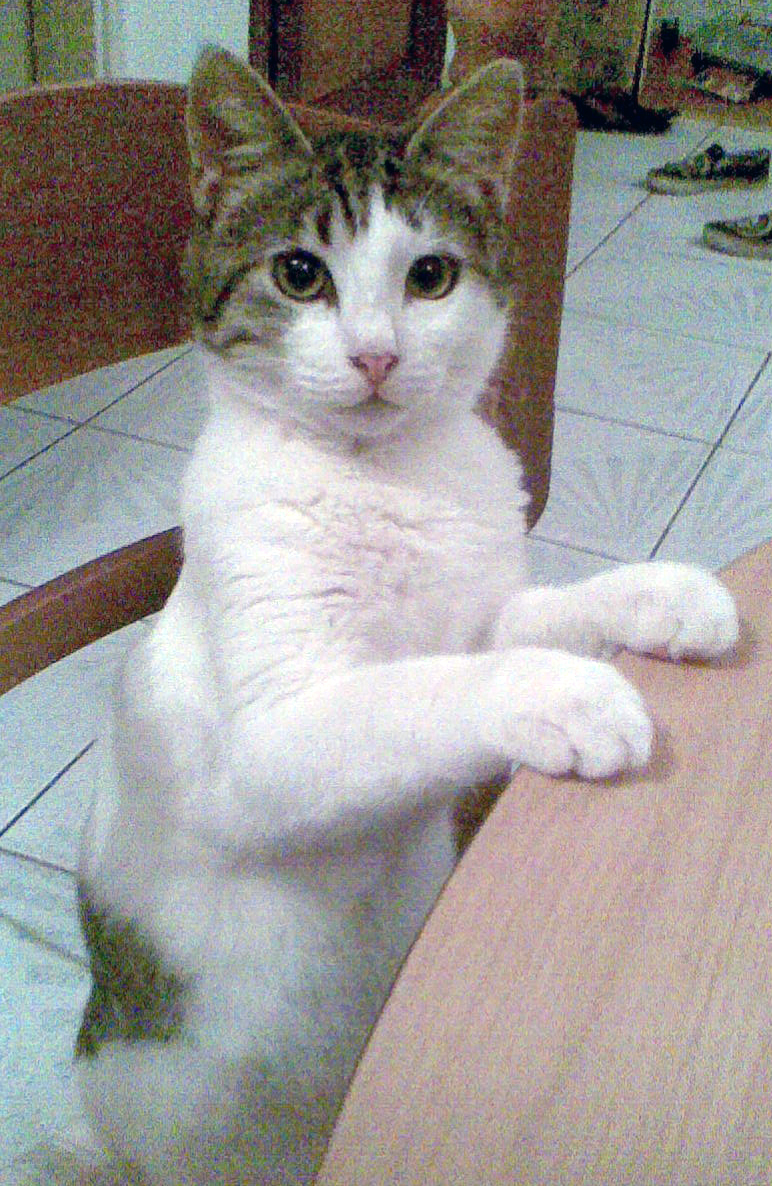
Aegean cat

The Aegean is a cat of Greek origin that has been developed since the 1990s by the Feline Federation of Greece, using cats from the Cyclades. The name comes from the fact that the cats were originally found around the Aegean Sea. They are considered a national treasure of Greece. Aegean cats are a landrace, and are one of the oldest distinct populations of the domestic cat. They have an affinity for fishing and water, and are numerous in Greek fishing ports. It is a medium-sized, muscular cat with a lighter European or Continental type body, medium-sized round paws, and green almond-shaped eyes. The coat is always two or three colors, one of which is always white. The breed is mostly free from common feline diseases.

== Alpine Lynx ==
The Alpine Lynx is a white, short-tailed cat breed that can have either curled or straight ears. They may be either short- or long-haired, and may have tufted toes. They are a medium-sized breed whose back legs are longer than their front legs. It was developed from a cross between a Highlander and a white barn cat. It is recognized by the Rare and Exotic Feline Registry.

== American Lynx ==
The American Lynx is a short-haired cat breed with a spotted coat. This breed is bob-tailed or short-tailed. The coat pattern bears some resemblance to that of the bobcat. This breed is recognized by the Rare and Exotic Feline Registry.

== American Polydactyl ==
The American Polydactyl is a polydactyl cat, meaning that it has more than the usual number of toes. This breed is currently in development. As of 2018, it is recognized (since 2004) only by the Rare and Exotic Feline Registry.

== American Ringtail ==
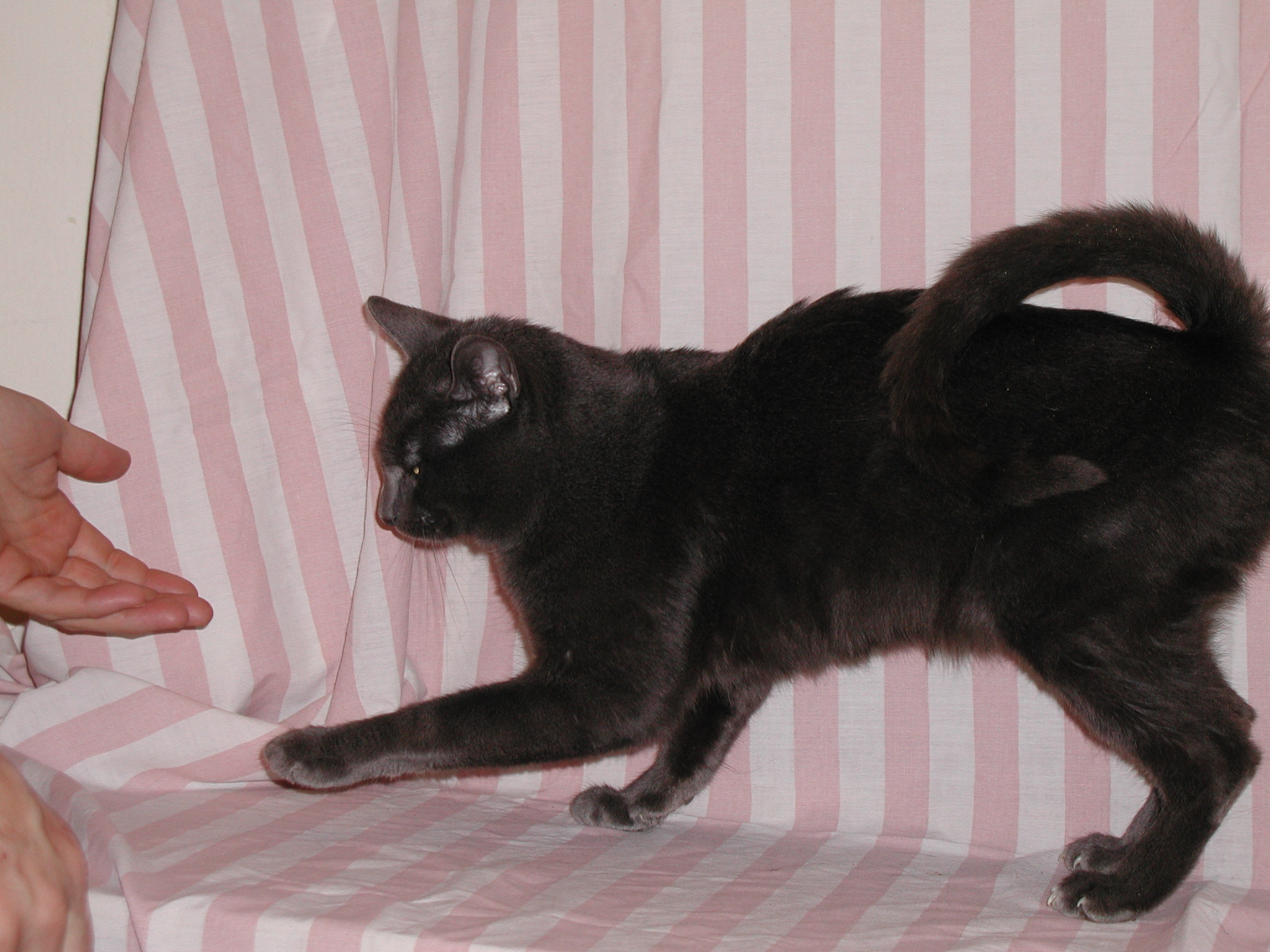
An American Ringtail cat

The American Ringtail, also known as the Ringtail Sing-a-Ling, is a cat breed with the ability to hold their tail in a ring-like shape. It is recognized as registration only by The International Cat Association.

== Aphrodite (Cyprus, Cypriot, Aphrodite's Giant, St. Helen, St. Nicholas cat) ==
The Cyprus cat is a landrace of cats native to Cyprus; it is a localized variant of the Aegean cat. As with the latter, attempts are underway to true-breed certain traits and establish a standardized breed, under a variety of names by different breeder groups. Recognition so far, under the name Aphrodite, is limited to the World Cat Federation/World Cat Congress since 2012, provisionally by The International Cat Association since 2017, and various more localized bodies such as the Cyprus Cats National Breed Association and the Cyprus Feline Society.

== Australian Tiffanie ==
The Australian Tiffanie is a cat breed derived from crosses between the short-haired Burmilla and the long-haired Chinchilla Persian. These cats resemble the old style of the Chinchilla Longhair. Some name confusion exists with this breed; this Australian cat is not the same as the Tiffanie breed in Europe (also known as the Burmilla Longhair) or the Tiffany breed in the United States. It is recognized by the Waratah State Cat Alliance.

== Bambino ==
The Bambino is a dwarf cat cross between the Munchkin and Sphynx breeds; it has the short legs of the former and the lack of fur of the latter. It is recognised by the Rare and Exotic Feline Registry.

In 2005, two cat breeders, Stephanie and Pat Osborne, started the Bambino breed at their Holy Moly Cattery in Arkansas, which later went defunct. They likely named it Bambino (Italian for "baby") because of its properties. One year later, The International Cat Association (TICA) recognized the Bambino as an experimental breed of cat.

It is technically legal to own a Bambino, but owning and breeding of it is discouraged and considered unethical due to health problems. In 2019, the Netherlands Food and Consumer Product Safety Authority ordered a couple to stop breeding the Bambino due to welfare concerns, which include painful limited mobility as a result of dwarfism.

The Bambino has also been given the name "XL Bully Cat" due to its similarities to the American Bully (XL Bully Dog).

== Bramble ==
The Bramble is a large wire-haired cat breed with a spotted coat pattern. It was derived from crossing the Bengal with brush-coated Peterbalds. It originates from the US and is recognized by the Rare and Exotic Feline Registry.

== Classicat (Jungala) ==
The Classicat is a cat breed originating from New Zealand. It is overall an Ocicat-type, but has a coat with the classic swirled tabby pattern. It is recognized by the New Zealand Cat Fancy.

== Desert Lynx ==
The Desert Lynx is a bob-tailed or short-tailed cat breed of US origin. This cat has spotted or marbled markings and resembles the bobcat, and the breed is recognized by the Rare and Exotic Feline Registry.

== Dwelf ==
The Dwelf is a dwarf cat cross of Sphynx, Munchkin, and American Curl stock, and has the defining traits of all three breeds: hairlessness, shortened legs, and curled ears. The breed is of US origin and was recognized by the now-defunct Dwarf Cat Association (or Designer Cat Association). Later, it became recognized by the Rare and Exotic Feline Registry.

== Elf ==
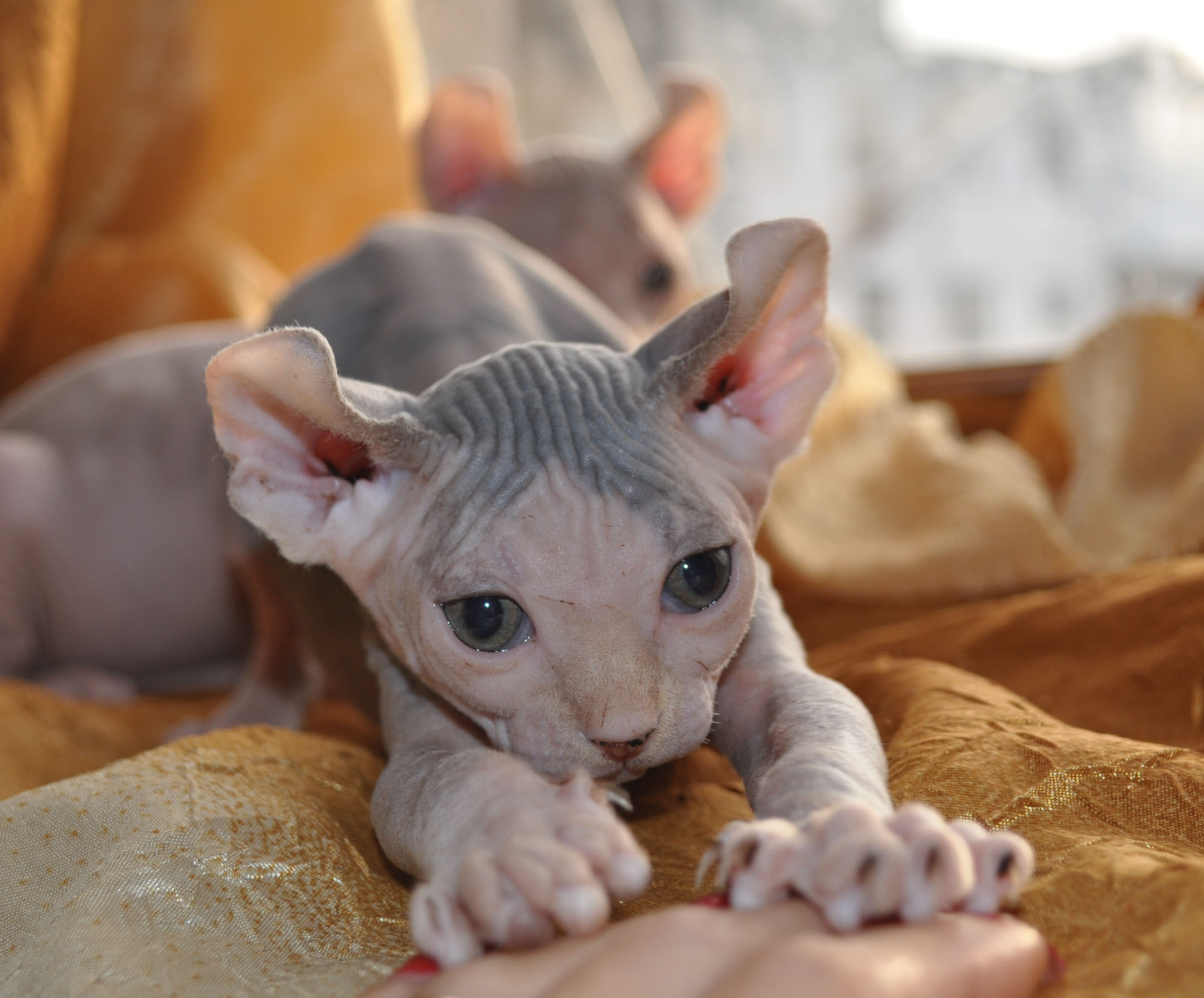
Elf cat

The Elf or Elf Sphynx is a nearly hairless variety with ears that curl backward. The gene responsible for hairlessness in the Sphynx (and thus in the Elf) produces skin that is not completely hairless; two types of hair formation occur: a few patches of light hairs particularly around the nose, tail, and toes; and a fine downy all-over covering. Care issues are as with Sphynx cats. As of 2022, this in-development variety is not recognized by major breed registries and cat-fancier organizations such as The International Cat Association (TICA) or the Cat Fanciers' Association (CFA). Some breeders have published draft breed standards for the Elf, based on those for the foundation breeds, but these documents are not entirely consistent with each other. Breeders are seeking TICA recognition as a preliminary new breed. The Elf has been included in the Australian National Cats (ANCats) breed list as experimental.

== Foldex ==
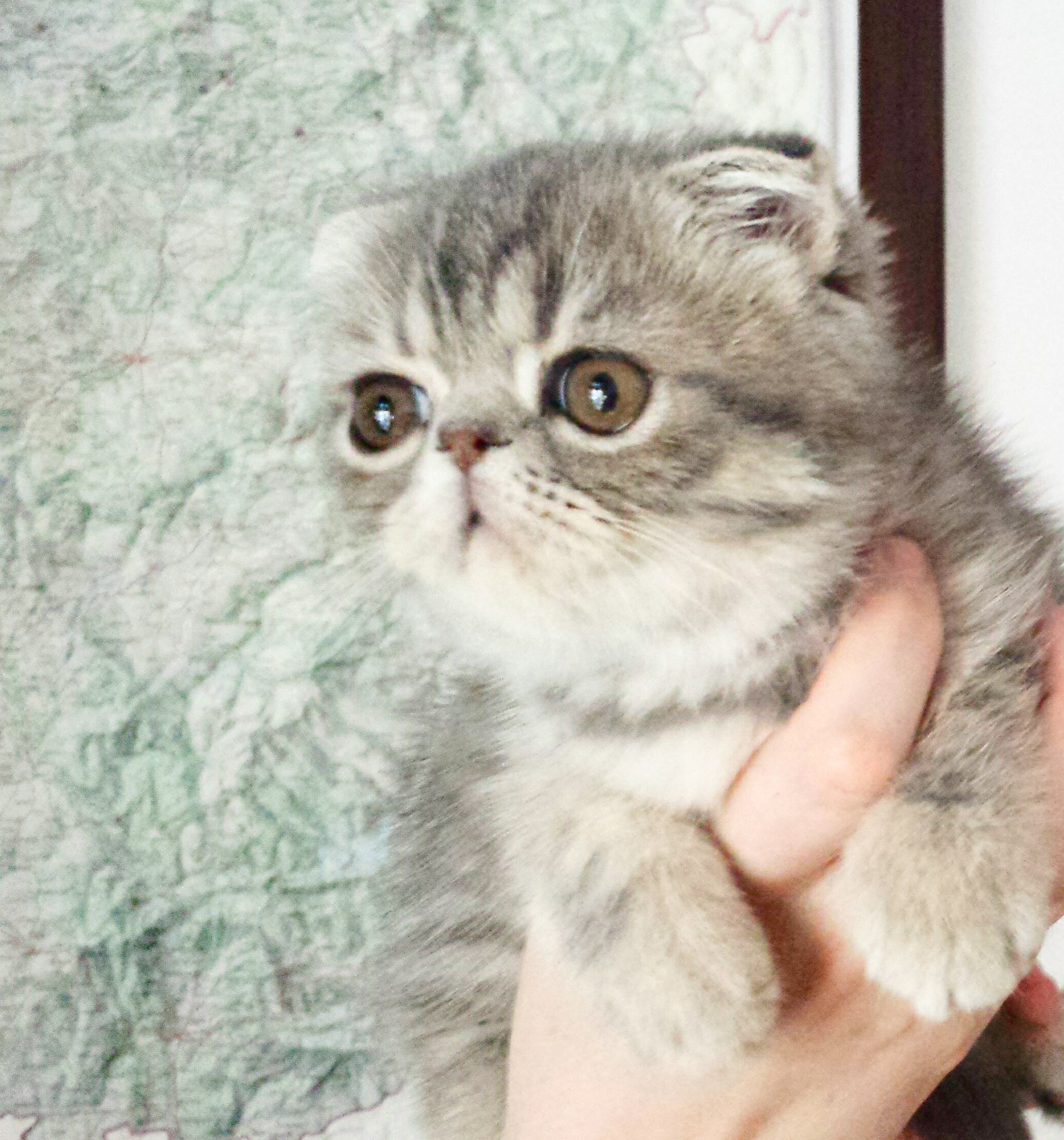
Foldex kitten (Blue Spotted Tabby)

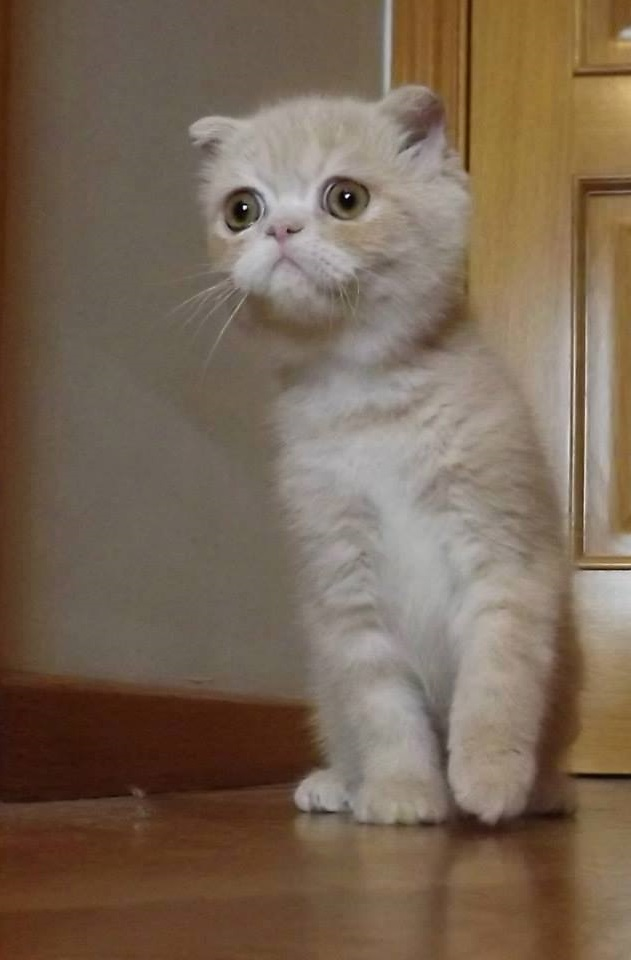
Foldex cat.

The Foldex cat, also known as the Exotic Fold, is a cat breed developed in the Canadian province of Quebec by crossbreeding a Scottish Fold and an Exotic Shorthair. Foldexes are medium-sized cats with a rounded face, short legs, and sometimes folded ears; while the latter are intended to be the defining feature of the breed, only about 50% of them exhibit it. The eyes are rounded, the ears small, and the body stout like that of Scottish Fold, with a short face between those of the two originating breeds. The coat may be of any length, colour, and pattern. The variety is recognized as a breed in its own right by one cat registry, the Canadian Cat Association (CCA), but not by any of the major international ones. Foldexes have genetic predispositions to multiple medical disorders, primarily inherited from the Scottish Fold, and their breeding has been banned in some countries as a result.

In 1995, a Foldex was first exhibited in a cat show by breed Betty-Ann Yaxley in Quebec. It was originally produced by crossbreeding a Scottish Fold with an Exotic Shorthair, resulting in a cat with a comparatively round head, shortened nose, and (ideally) folded ears. Further breeding and promotion by Jeanne Barrette resulted in the Canadian Cat Association (CCA) accepting the nascent breed in its Experimental category in November 1998. It was promoted to the CCA's New Breed category in August 2006, and granted Championship status in 2010.

The Foldex is known for its signature small, folded ears with round tips. However, only half of all Foldex inherit this trait. Those with non-folded ears are referred to as "straights" (versus "foldeds"); their ears grow straight in their adult stage as in most other cat breeds. Folded kittens' ears begin to show a visible fold between 21 and 28 days old. The Foldex's body stature is medium-built with strong muscles, short legs and a short neck. Their ears may resemble those of the Scottish Fold breed, but they only have one crease which folds forward and downwards, while Scottish Folds have multiple creases that result in their ears laying flat. Their coats have variety of colour, patterns, and lengths; the CCA standard permits any coat colour and pattern, and any length, since it also permits outcrossing to Exotic Longhair. The Foldex breed has a round face with wide-open eyes. Their nose is longer than an Exotic, but shorter than a Scottish Fold.

Foldex cats are genetically predisposed to a risk of feline polycystic kidney disease (PKD), which can cause renal failure. This predisposition is inherited from the Exotic ancestry, being a trait of Persian and related breeds. A Foldex cat can be pre-screened for the genetics that cause PKD. Foldexes are also be genetically predisposed to health conditions inherited from the Scottish Fold, including congenital osteochondrodysplasia, chondrodystrophy, osteodystrophy, and epiphyseal dysplasia, caused by the folded-ear genetic mutation (the Fd or SF gene) which leads to generalized cartilage and bone malformation, not just in the ear. This gene can also be tested for (including in potential breeding stock).

Sources disagree on whether straight-eared specimens of this and related breeds can still carry and pass on the gene for it. A laboratory at University of California, Davis, states that even having one copy of the gene will cause a folded ear and a predisposition to some medical problems, while having two copies of it will produce folded ears and debilitating joint disorders, but that any straight-eared specimen will not have the gene at all. A veterinary experts group empaneled by the German Federal Ministry of Food and Agriculture, disagreed, finding that straight-eared offspring may also carry the gene and simply not exhibit ear-folding; the Austrian government has also accepted the findings of the German body, and the government of Flanders (Belgium) has taken a similar position.

Several countries and sub-national jurisdictions have enacted animal welfare laws or regulations that prohibit breeding of fold-ear cats, including: Germany in 2005, the Netherlands in 2014, Austria in 2020, Flanders, Belgium, in 2021, Victoria (Australia) in 2020, and even the birthplace of the Scottish Fold breed, Scotland since 2018. Some countries have also banned selling or giving away fold-ear cats, or breeding with any cat that bears the fold-ear gene mutation, including any straight-eared offspring that carry it. The Flanders ban makes no straight-ear allowances and bans entire breeds that carry the gene. Furthermore, some of the major cat registries, including the Governing Council of the Cat Fancy (GCCF) and Fédération Internationale Féline (FIFé), do not recognise, nor allow for the registry of, Scottish Folds and related breeds due to their health issues.

== Genetta ==
The Genetta is an American-originating dwarf cat breed derived from crossbreeding the Munchkin and Bengal (sometimes also Ocicat) breeds in an effort to create a long-bodied, short-legged cat with a spotted, striped or marbled coat. The breed is named after–and is an attempt to superficially resemble–the African genet (Genetta sp), which is a viverrid, not a felid (though the viverrids are distantly related to cats under the Feliformia suborder). It is recognised by the Rare and Exotic Feline Registry.

== Highlander (Highland Lynx) ==
Originally developed in 1993 as the Highland Lynx, and accepted by the Rare and Exotic Feline Registry (REFR) under that name, this cat is a crossbreed of the Desert Lynx and the Jungle Curl, to add the latter's curled ears to the former. It became known as the Highlander in 2005, and was recognized as a "preliminary new breed" by The International Cat Association (TICA) in 2008, and an "advanced new breed" in 2018. Though the breed is said to resemble the bobcat and was originally given a name that included the word "lynx", it is a wholly domestic cat without any bobcat (or any other lynx species) ancestry. REFR later split the breed into the original Highland Lynx (Desert Lynx × Jungle Curl) and a separate new Highlander (a back-cross of Highland Lynx with more Desert Lynx), which conflicts with TICA's breed definition.

== Jungle Curl ==
The Jungle Curl cat is a felid hybrid cat breed of US origin, primarily a cross between the African jungle cat (Felis chaus) species (or a domestic hybrid based on it, such as the Chausie), and another domestic breed that has curled ears such as the American Curl, Highlander (Highland Lynx), or Hemmingway Curl, with the addition of several other spotted hybrid breeds, including Bengal, Savannah, and Serengeti. The Rare and Exotic Breed Registry recognizes the breed. The ears are curled, polydactyly is permitted, and the coat may be spotted or tawny, and of varying lengths.

== Kinkalow ==
The Kinkalow is a dwarf cat cross between the Munchkin and the American Curl. It has short legs and curled ears. It is recognised by the Rare and Exotic Feline Registry.

== Kucing Malaysia (Piawaian Kucing Malaysia) ==
The Kucing Malaysia, or Piawaian Kucing Malaysia, is the first indigenous Malaysian cat breed. It has a conformation similar to the Tonkinese, while its color is similar to the Ragdoll. These cats have a white blaze on the face and muzzle and white markings on the colorpoint limbs. It is recognized by the Malaysian Cat Club.

== Lambkin (Nanus Rex) ==
The Lambkin, also known as the Nanus Rex, is a short-legged dwarf cat breed of US origin with a densely curled coat. They are derived from crossing the Munchkin and the Selkirk Rex. This breed is recognized by the Rare and Exotic Feline Registry and formerly by the now-defunct Designer Cat Association or Dwarf Cat Association.

== Mandalay ==
The Mandalay is a cat breed originally derived from crosses between domestic short-haired cats and the Burmese. Later, Abyssinians were used to introduce the cinnamon and fawn genes. These cats resemble the Asian Shorthair that is bred in Europe. There should be no evidence of sepia-pointing; i.e., contrast between points and body. This breed originated in New Zealand and is recognized by the New Zealand Cat Fancy.

== Minskin ==
The Minskin is a dwarf cat breed developed from the Munchkin, Burmese, Sphynx, and Devon Rex breeds; it has short legs, is mostly hairless or with a very short coat, and has point coloration at the extremities. It is recognised by REFR, and recognized in the "preliminary new breed" category by The International Cat Association (TICA) since 2018.

== Minuet (Napoleon) ==
The Minuet, also known as the Napoleon, is a dwarf cat breed that crosses the Munchkin and Persian (or sometimes the Persian variants Himalayan or Exotic Shorthair). This results in a cat with a Persian's brachycephalic ("peke-face") appearance, but with short legs. Coat length and coloration will depend on the non-Munchking parentage. This breed is of US origin and has been recognized by the Rare and Exotic Feline Registry and formerly by the now-defunct Designer Cat Association or Dwarf Cat Association. It was recognized by The International Cat Association (TICA) as experimental in 2001, renamed by TICA from Napoleon to Minuet in 2015, and approved for TICA championship show status in 2016. The breed is recognized under the original Napoleon name by the Rare and Exotic Feline Registry. However, like other dwarf-cat breeds, it is banned by many registries.

== Mojave Spotted ==
The Mojave Spotted (formerly Mojave Desert Cat) is a polydactyl cat with a spotted coat. They are derived from crosses between Bengal bloodlines and those of naturally polydactyl cats from the Mojave Desert region in the US. This breed is recognized by the Rare and Exotic Feline Registry.

== Owyhee Bob (Mountain Bob) ==
The Owyhee Bob is a cat breed that is a mix of the Siamese and Manx cats, and is of United States origin. The most distinctive feature of this cat is its color and build, and it is slow to mature like the Manx. The Owyhee Bob is a colorpoint breed (like the Siamese), of medium to large size. The body is medium in length, hard and muscular with a broad chest. The head shape is medium to large with full cheekbones and whisker pads, giving a rounded appearance to the muzzle. The strong chin gives a balanced appearance to the head. The ears are medium to large, wide set, full at the base and tapering, standing straight and upright, sometimes feathering to a rounded tip that is often tufted in the longer-haired cats. The large oval eyes are slightly slanted and wide set, and are always Siamese blue. Legs are medium in length and are sturdy and well-muscled. Paws are large and round (and can be polydactyl). Females range from 8 to 12 pounds and males from 12 to 16 pounds, with some getting larger. The tails come in rumpy, stumpy and longy, with some breeders docking the long tails (in countries where this is still legal). They come in all coat lengths except hairless. The coat is soft and plush, like that of a rabbit, and should not be curly or wavy. The Owyhee Bob is sometimes said to have a temperament that is more like that of a dog than a cat; they can be taught to sit, lie down, and play fetch. They are a vocal breed. They are currently recognized only by the Rare and Exotic Feline Registry.

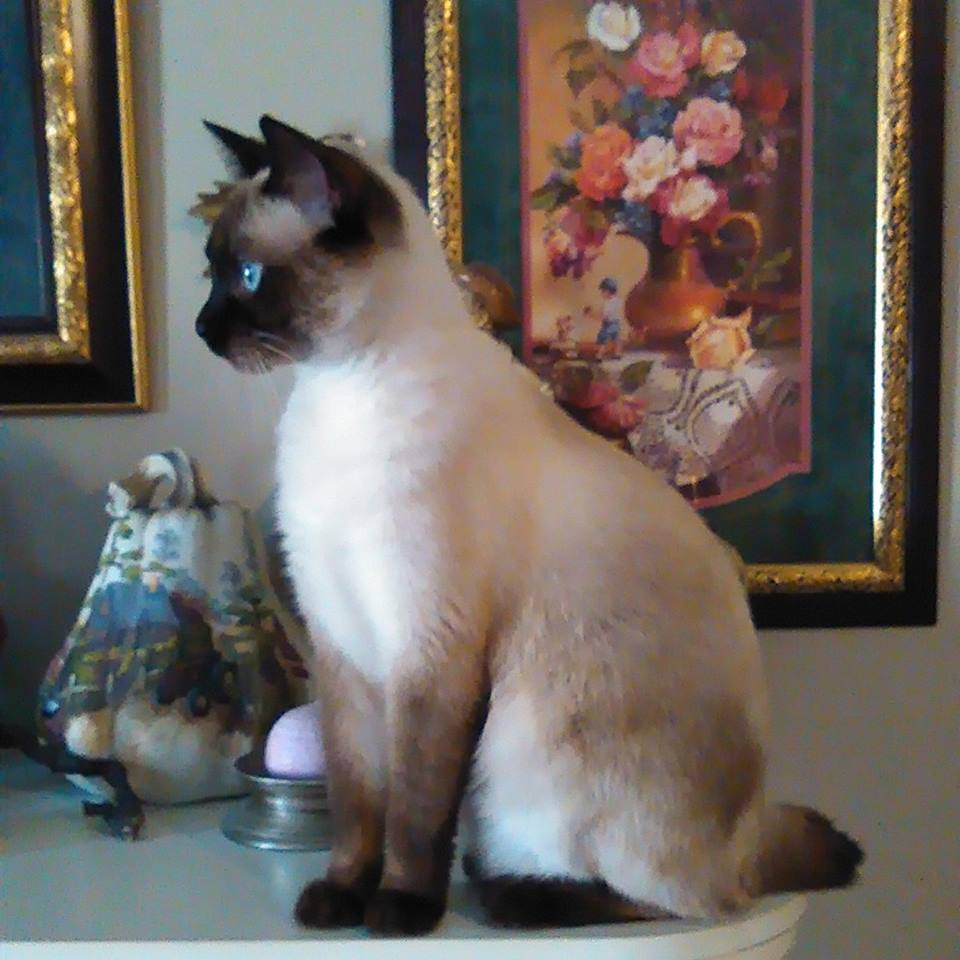
Classic seal point

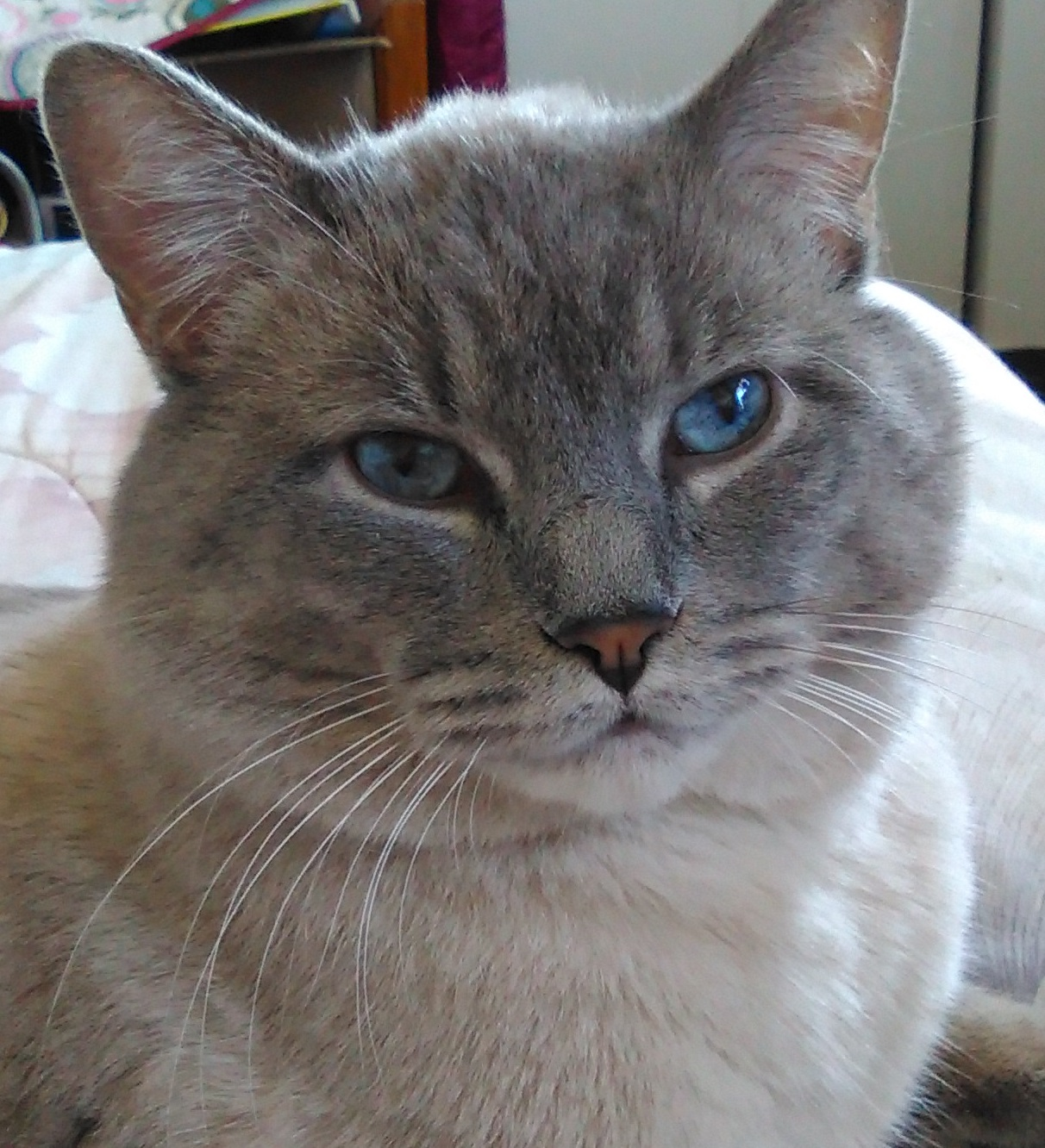
Head shot of a mature blue-point male

== Pantherette ==
The Pantherette is a felid hybrid cat breed of US origin, in development since the early 2000s, and was said to have still been in development in a 2014 book. It is intended to resemble a miniature black panther. Pantherette is a crossbreed of black (melanistic) Bengals (a hybrid of the domestic cat and the Asian leopard cat), with full-tailed specimens of the Pixie-Bob breed, as well as the Maine Coon and another experimental Bengal crossbreed known as the Mojave Spotted); some unsubstantiated claims have suggested also some direct crossing to wild leopard cat subspecies, though this is unlikely given the modern restrictions on international trade in wildlife, and the breeders' own sites do not make this claim. Pantherettes are large, muscular, and short-haired, with gold to green eyes. Breed developers Mike and Marie Bloodgood of Kentucky have asserted a trademark over the name. The breed was "recognized" by a small breeder club called the International Progressive Cat Breeders' Alliance (last updated in 2004, and defunct since 2017), and its subsidiary International Pantherette Breeders' Association (which produced a draft breed standard in 2001, no longer permitting outcrosses to other breeds in 2004, and not updated since then), but these were both operated by the Bloodgoods themselves. Pantherette remains listed by the Rare and Exotic Feline Registry, but with no information about the breed as of 2024. The breeders' own websites and other public statements about it date to 2004–2006, and new information about the breed stopped appearing in other sources around 2012, so the breeding program may have been abandoned.

== Safari ==
The Safari is a felid hybrid developed by crossing Geoffroy's cat (Leopardus geoffroyi), a wild South American species, with domestic cats.

== Skookum (LaMerm) ==
The Skookum is a dwarf cat breed with curly fur, derived from crossing the Munchkin with the LaPerm, a Rex breed. This breed originates in the US and was previously known as the LaMerm. It was recognized by the now-defunct Dwarf Cat Association, and remains recognized by the Rare and Exotic Feline Registry.

== Tasman Manx ==
The Tasman Manx is a curly-furred Manx-type cat breed that arose spontaneously in some Australian and New Zealand Manx crossbreeding lines. All can trace their ancestry to a single Persian stud that had European ancestry. This same cat may also be responsible for the Bohemian Rex (or Czech Curly Cat). Apart from the curly fur, these cats have the characteristics and conformation of the Manx. This cat is now recognised by NZCF.

== Van cat ==
The Van cat is a landrace, native to the Lake Van area of Turkey (and not to be confused with the standardized Turkish Van breed, or the Turkish Angora breed). A state-sponsored breeding program is under way to true-breed some specimens into a standardized cat breed with fixed traits.

== See also ==
- Cat body-type mutation
- Cat registry
- Cat genetics
- Designer crossbreed
- Felid hybrid
- List of cat breeds
- Lists of domestic animal breeds
- Ojos Azules, a former experimental breed extinct since the 2000s, when breeders abandoned the project due to lethal genetic mutations
