= Aegean cat =

Aegean
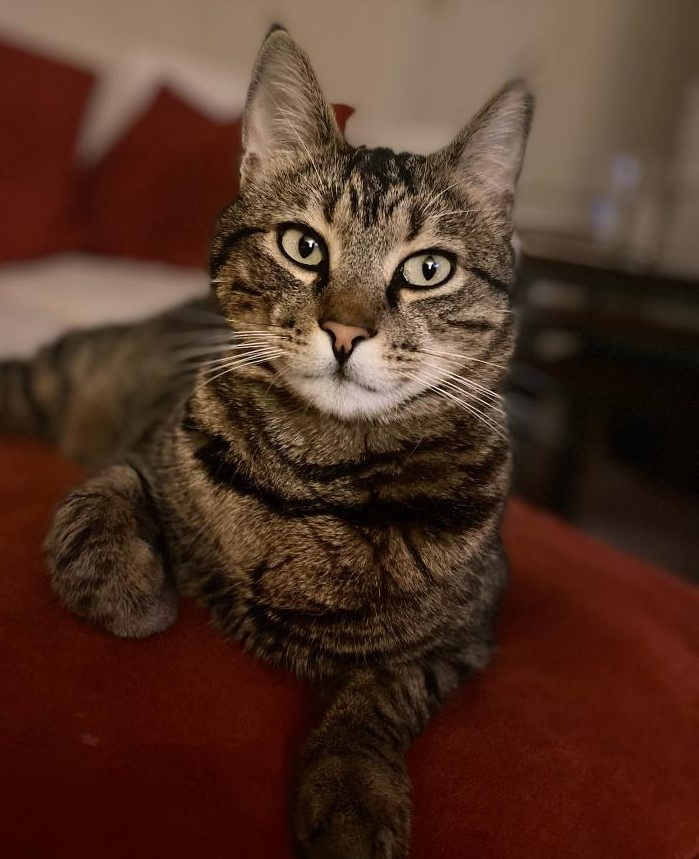
- Male black tabby Aegean cat
- Origin: Greece
- Foundation bloodstock: landrace domestic shorthairs from the Cycladic islands
- Variety status: Not recognised as a standardised breed by any major breed registry.

Notes
- Occurs naturally throughout Greece and Turkey

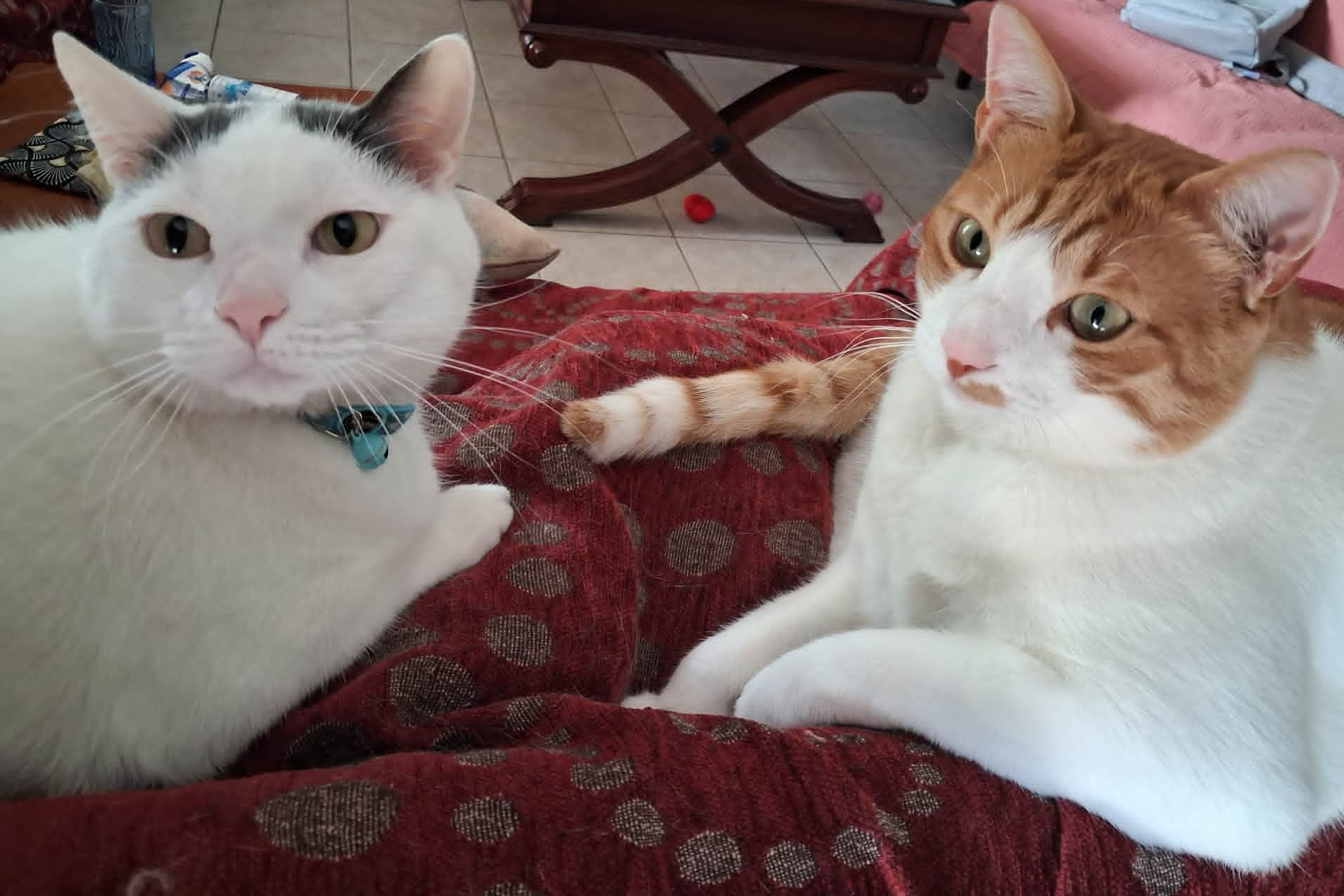
Two male Aegean cats, laying on a sofa. Aegean cats can adapt easily inside an indoors setting. They tend to be energetic, especially in their youth, but also social, greeting their owners at the door.

Aegean cats (Greek: γάτα του Αιγαίου gáta tou Aigaíou) are a naturally occurring landrace of domestic cat originating from the Cycladic Islands of Greece and western Turkey. It is considered a natural cat; a landrace developed without human interference. Selective breeding to develop the Aegean cat into a formal breed began in the early 1990s by breeders in the fledgling Greek cat fancy, but the Aegean has yet to be recognised by any major fancier and breeder organisation. It is considered to be the only native Greek landrace variety of cat.

== History ==
The Aegean cat, as its name suggests, originates from the Cycladic Islands in the Aegean Sea, where they occur as a natural landrace. Aegeans are considered one of the oldest domesticated cat breeds, cats having been introduced to the islands during the Bronze Age. They are common as feral cats in Greece and Turkey, where they are found amongst fishing ports asking for food offerings. In Greece, Aegean cats are considered a national treasure. Feral Aegean cats are notable predators of Aegean wall lizards in the Cyclades.

== Aegean cats as pets ==
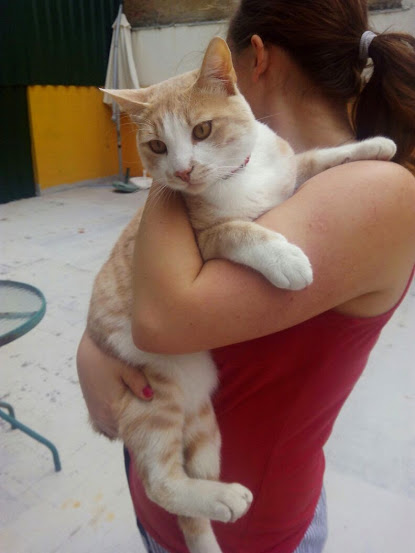
A 7-month old domesticated Aegean kitten may reach the size and physical condition of its full-grown mainland European counterparts

Although the Aegean has only very recently begun to be bred systematically, it has been domesticated for many centuries and thus has become adapted very well to humans. It is a social pet that tolerates living in an apartment rather well. It is intelligent, active, lively and also communicative, not hesitating to draw a person's attention.

== Aegean cat characteristics ==
Aegean cats are a medium-sized, muscular, semi-longhaired cat. The coat is bicolour or tricolour with one of the colours being almost always white. White usually takes up between 25% and 90% of the body. The colour of their coat might include many other colours and patterns. Their paws are medium in size and have a round shape. Their tail can be long and "hooked". The ears have a wide base and rounded tips and are covered by hair. The eyes have an almond shape and their colour can be any shade of green, blue and yellow.

Aegean cats are noted for their affinity for water and fishing. Because the breed was allowed to develop through natural selection, rather than selective breeding, Aegean cats are free from most feline genetic diseases.
