= Sphynx cat =

Hairless breed of cat

Sphynx
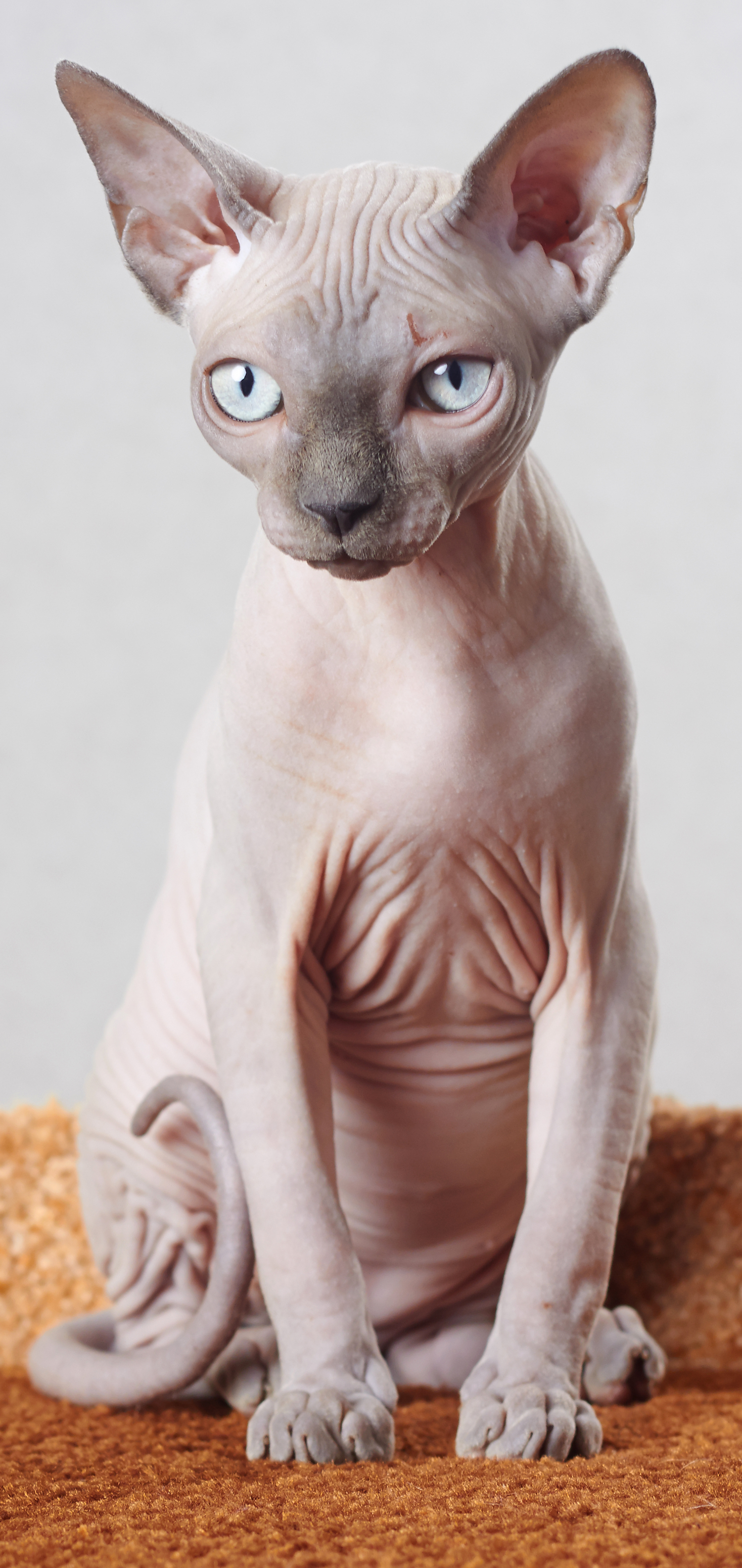
- Origin: Canada

Breed standards
- CFA: standard
- FIFe: standard
- TICA: standard
- ACFA/CAA: standard
- CCA-AFC: standard

The Sphynx cat (pronounced SFINKS, /ˈsfɪŋks/) also known as the Canadian Sphynx, is a breed of cat known for its lack of fur. Hairlessness in cats is a naturally occurring genetic mutation, and the Sphynx was developed through selective breeding of these animals, starting in the 1960s.

The skin of these cats has the texture of chamois leather, and may have fine hairs or be completely hairless. Whiskers may be present, either whole or broken, or may be totally absent. Per the breed standards, they have a somewhat wedge-shaped head with large eyes and ears, long legs and a long tail, and neat rounded paws. Their skin is the color that their fur would be, and all the usual cat markings (solid, point, van, tabby, tortie, etc.) may be found on the Sphynx cat's skin. Because they have no fur, Sphynx cats lose body heat more readily than coated cats, making them both warm to the touch and prone to seeking out warm places.

== Breed standards ==
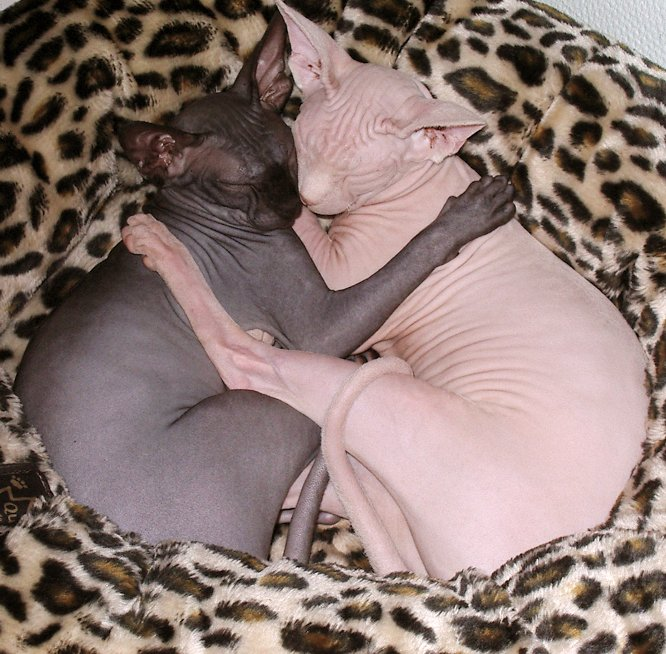
Two Sphynx sleeping, black and white colors

The breed standard from The International Cat Association (TICA) calls for:

- Wedge-shaped heads with prominent cheekbones
- Large, lemon-shaped eyes
- Very large ears with hair on inside, but soft down on outside base
- Well-muscled, powerful neck of medium length
- Medium length torso, barrel-chested, and full, round abdomen, sometimes called a pot belly
- Paw pads thicker than other cats, giving the appearance of walking on cushions
- Whiplike, tapering tail from body to tip, (sometimes with fur all over tail or a puff of fur on the tip, like a lion)
- Muscular body

== History of the cat breed ==
The modern Sphynx cat is distinct from Russian hairless cat breeds, like Peterbald and Donskoy. Although reports of hairless cats date back centuries, breeders have been developing the modern Sphynx breed since the early 1960s. Two different sets of hairless felines discovered in North America in the 1970s provided the foundation cats for what was shaped into the existing Sphynx breed.

The current North American and European Sphynx breed is descended from two lines of natural mutations:

- Dermis and Epidermis (1975) barn cats from the Pearson family of Wadena, Minnesota
- Bambi, Punkie and Paloma (1978) stray cats found in Toronto, Ontario, Canada, and raised by Shirley Smith

=== Toronto ===
The Canadian Sphynx breed was started in 1966 in Toronto, Ontario, Canada, when a hairless male kitten named Prune was born to a black and white domestic shorthair queen (Elizabeth).

After purchasing these cats in 1966 and initially referring to them as "Moonstones" and "Canadian Hairless", a science graduate of the University of Toronto combined efforts with his mother Yania, a longtime Siamese breeder, and Keese and Rita Tenhoves to develop a breed of cats which was subsequently renamed as Sphynx. The Bawas and the Tenhoves were the first individuals able to determine the autosomal recessive nature of the Sphynx gene for hairlessness while also being successful in transforming this knowledge into a successful breeding program with kittens which were eventually capable of reproducing. The Tenhoves were initially able to obtain for the new breed provisional showing status through the US' Cat Fanciers' Association (CFA) but ultimately had the status revoked in 1971, when it was felt by the CFA Board that the breed had concerns over fertility. The first breeders had rather vague ideas about Sphynx genetics and faced a number of problems.

In 1978, cat breeder Shirley Smith found three hairless kittens on the streets of her Toronto neighborhood; it is unclear if, or how, they relate to Elizabeth or her unknown mate who fathered Prune 12 years earlier. In 1983, Smith sent two of her foundlings, named Punkie and Paloma, to Dr. Hugo Hernandez in the Netherlands to breed them to a white Devon Rex named Curare van Jetrophin. The resulting litter produced five kittens: two males from this litter (Q. Ramses and Q. Ra) were used, along with Punkie's half-sister, Paloma.

=== Minnesota ===
The first noted naturally occurring foundation Sphynx originated as hairless stray barn cats in Wadena, Minnesota, at the farm of Milt and Ethelyn Pearson. The Pearsons identified hairless kittens occurring in several litters of their domestic shorthair barn cats in the mid-1970s. Two hairless female kittens born in 1975 and 1976, Epidermis and Dermis, were sold to Oregon breeder Kim Mueske, and became an important part of the Sphynx breeding program. Also working with the Pearson line of cats was breeder Georgiana Gattenby of Brainerd, Minnesota, who outcrossed with Cornish Rex cats.

== Genetics and breeding ==
The standard for the Sphynx differs between cat associations such as The International Cat Association (TICA), Fédération Internationale Féline (FIFE) and Cat Fanciers' Association (CFA). Other hairless cat breeds have standards that differ from those of Sphynx. For example, the Don Sphynx and the Peterbald. The genes which cause hairlessness in these breeds differs from the ones which cause hairlessness in the Sphynx.

=== Breeding ===
In 2010, DNA analysis confirmed that Sphynx hairlessness was produced by a different allele of the same gene that produces the short curly hair of the Devon Rex (termed the "re" allele), with the Sphynx's allele being incompletely dominant over the Devon allele and both being recessive to the wild type. Other associations may vary, and the Russian Blue is a permitted outcross in the Governing Council of the Cat Fancy (GCCF).

=== Genetics ===
The Sphynx's distinctive hairlessness is primarily due to a mutation in the KRT71 gene, which also affects other breeds, such as the Devon Rex and Selkirk Rex, albeit with different outcomes. This gene is responsible for the keratinization of the hair follicle. In the Sphynx, the mutation, known as "hr", leads to a complete loss of function, damaging the structure of the hair. Normally, KRT71 helps produce strong hair that is securely anchored to the skin. However, due to the "hr" mutation, the hair of Sphynx cats lacks a solid root or bulb, making it extremely weak. Consequently, the hair is fragile and loosely attached, causing it to fall out easily and contributing to the breed's nearly hairless appearance. Sphynx cats may still retain very soft, short hair on parts of their body, such as the nose, tails, and toes, but overall, their coat is significantly reduced and lacks the typical structure seen in other cats.

In the Devon Rex mutation, a residual activity of the protein still exists. The Selkirk Rex allele (sadr) is dominant over the wild type gene, which is dominant over the Devon Rex allele (re) and the Sphynx (hr), which forms an allelic series of : KRT71SADRE > KRT71+ > KRT71re > KRT71hr.

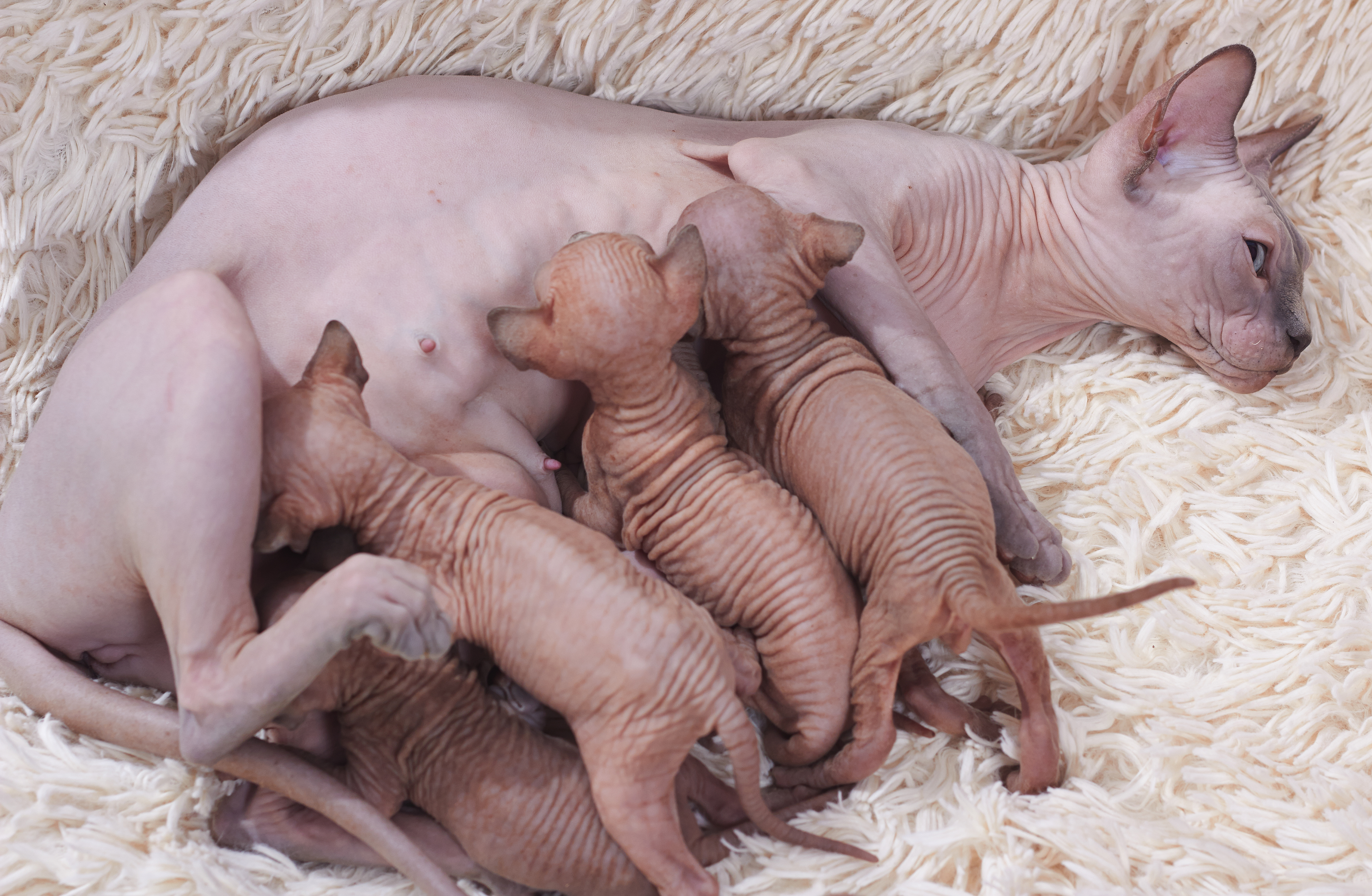
Sphynx mother with kittens

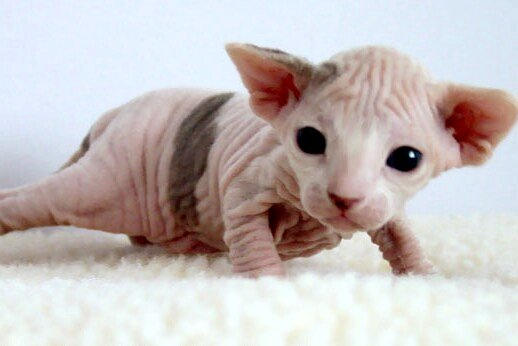
Two-week-old Sphynx kitten

== Behavior ==
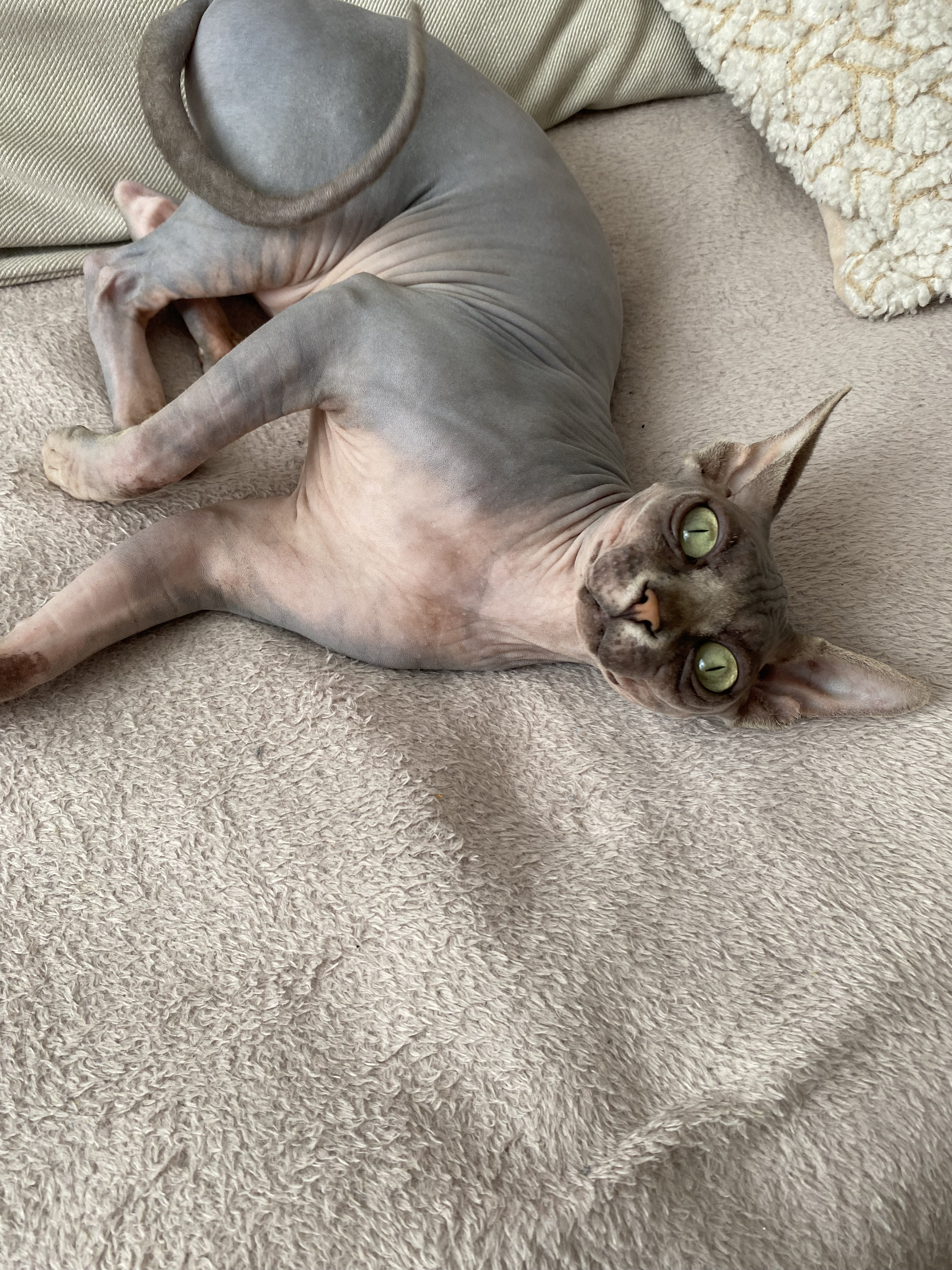
A Sphynx cat being playful

Sphynx are known for their extroverted behavior. They display a high level of energy, intelligence, curiosity and affection for their owners. They are one of the more dog-like breeds of cats, frequently greeting their owners at the door, and are friendly when meeting strangers. Sphynx cats tend to be highly attached to their owners, often demanding large amounts of attention. This breed tends to cuddle for body warmth due to their lack of fur. A study was conducted by the Journal of Veterinary Behavior in 2012, and while further research needs to be conducted, purebred Sphynx cats were rated by their owners as friendlier than purebred European cats.

== Care ==
Care should be taken to limit the Sphynx cat's exposure to outdoor sunlight at length, as they can develop sunburn and skin damage similar to that of humans. In general, Sphynx cats should never be allowed outdoors unattended, as they have limited means to conserve body heat when it is cold. In some climates, owners provide coats or other clothing in the winter to help them conserve body heat.

While they lack much of the fur of other cat breeds, Sphynxes are not necessarily hypoallergenic. Allergies to cats are triggered by a protein called Fel d1, not cat hair itself. Fel d1 is a protein primarily found in cat saliva and sebaceous glands. Those with cat allergies may react to direct contact with Sphynx cats. Even though reports exist that some people with allergies successfully tolerate Sphynx cats, they are fewer than those who have allergic reactions.

The skin of the Sphynx cat is known for its excessive production of a greasy secretion, which often results in the accumulation of a sticky, dark brown, or reddish-brown layer that necessitates regular cleaning. Furthermore, Sphynx cats typically produce more earwax than most hairy domestic cats. This increased wax production is attributed to the minimal to absent hair within their ears, which allows for the accumulation of dirt, skin oils (sebum), and ear wax, thereby requiring frequent cleaning. Additionally, they often accumulate oils and debris under their nails and within their numerous skin folds due to the lack of fur. Regular maintenance of these areas, including the nails and skin folds, is essential for the health and hygiene of the breed.

== Health ==
The Sphynx faces challenges because of its lack of protective fur. Skin cancer may be a problem if exposed to sunlight for long durations of time.

The lack of hair can cause health issues with kittens in the first weeks of life because of susceptibility to respiratory infections. It is recommended that breeders do not separate their kittens from their mothers before they are 14 weeks old. This ensures the kitten is mature enough to cope with new environment.

In a review of over 5,000 cases of urate urolithiasis the Sphynx was over-represented, with four recorded cases out of a population of 28.

=== Hypertrophic cardiomyopathy ===
The breed does have instances of the genetic disorder hypertrophic cardiomyopathy (HCM). Other domestic cat breeds prone to HCM include Persian, Ragdoll, Norwegian Forest cat, Siberian cats, British Shorthair and Maine Coon; however, any domestic cat including mixed breeds can acquire HCM. Studies are being undertaken to understand the links in breeding and the disorder. Cats are screened for HCM disease with echocardiography (ultrasound of the heart), as well as with additional tests determined by the veterinarian cardiologist including electrocardiogram (EKG, ECG), chest radiographs (X-rays), and/or blood tests.

The Sphynx cat has a high rate of heart disease, either as HCM or mitral valve dysplasia. In a 2012 study of 114 Sphynx cats, 34% were found to have an abnormal heart, with 16 cats having mitral valve dysplasia and 23 cats having HCM. These prevalences were found in cats with an average age of 2.62 years. Male cats developed more severe disease than female cats and often developed it earlier, at an average age of 19 months for males and 29 months for females. Since the prevalence of genetic heart disease is high in this breed, many breeders will recommend screening for HCM yearly.

As HCM progresses into an advanced stage, cats may experience congestive heart failure (CHF) or thromboembolism.

=== Congenital myasthenic syndrome ===
Congenital myasthenic syndrome (CMS), previously referred to as muscular dystrophy, myopathy or spasticity, is a type of inherited neuromuscular disorder associated with alpha-dystroglycan deficiency, found in Sphynx and in Devon Rex cats as well as variants of these breeds, which can occur between the first 3 to 23 weeks of their life. This condition has also been described, but is rarely seen. Cats affected by CMS show generalized muscle weakness and fatigue, as well as ventroflexion of the head and neck, head bobbing, and scapulae protrusion.

== See also ==
- Donskoy cat
- List of cat body-type mutations
- List of cat breeds
