= CFA International Cat Show =

Annual cat show hosted by the Cat Fanciers' Association

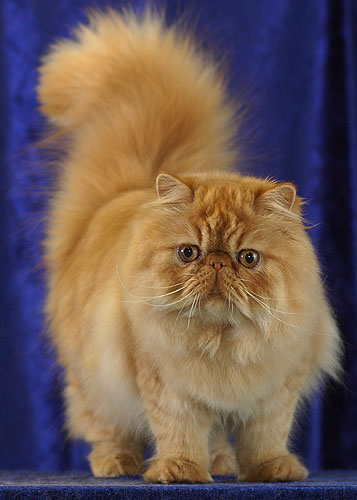
The Persian breed has won "Best of Show" seventeen times at the CFA International Cat Show.

The CFA International Cat Show is a cat show hosted by the Cat Fanciers' Association. The Cat Fanciers' Association was founded in 1906 after it separated from the American Cat Association.

The CFA International Cat Show has been held on an annual basis since 1994 with the exceptions of 2007, 2010, and 2020-2022. Considered the Rolls-Royce of international cat shows, it is the largest show of its type in the US. Cleveland has hosted the event a record five times. Males or neutered males have won "Best in Show" eighteen of the twenty-seven times the show has been held. The Persian cat breed has won "Best in Show" seventeen of the past twenty-seven shows. The show was renamed the CFA-Royal Canin World Championship in 2012. Dr. Elsey's Precious Cat Litter became lead sponsor in 2013. In 2015 it returned to using the "CFA International Show" name.

== Competition ==
In 2019, the show was held on October 12–13 in Cleveland, Ohio. The show was traditionally held the weekend before Thanksgiving in November in the United States. At each show, there are twelve to sixteen specialty judging rings, which are for both long-haired and shorthaired cat breeds, including kittens, Championship cat (non-spayed or neutered pedigree cats over eight months old), and Premiership cat (spayed or neutered pedigreed cats over eight months old). Day one of the show is preliminaries for best in breed such as Persian, Maine Coon, and Tonkinese. The second and final day of the competition shows the best in each cat breed in all three categories mentioned then compete for the best in each category overall, then for "Best in Show", which the overall winner of the competition. Top five winners in each category and overall are presented.

== Charity ==
Proceeds from the show go to the Winn Feline Foundation. Since 1968, the foundation has raised over $2 million with the entire amount going to cat health research.

== Foundation ==
CFA Foundation was created on June 22, 1990, the original idea to having a foundation was to educate people on cat history, but has since turned into a museum, Feline Historical Museum, with a complete library full of more than 1,400 books about all things cat related

== List of Best in Shows ==
Year	Location	Name of cat	Breed of cat	Gender of cat	Owner(s) – location	Breeder(s) – location	Number of cats and kittens in competition
1994	Atlanta	El-Dia Blue Danube	Blue Mackerel Tabby Oriental Shorthair	Male	Barbara L. Phelps	Not listed.	N/A
1995	Chicago, Illinois	Sol-Mer Sharif	Brown Tabby American Shorthair	Male	Mary Jo Mersol-Barg	Not listed.	Over 1300
1996	Anaheim, California	Agonistes Commotion of Scrimshaw	Black Persian	Male	Not listed	Not listed	1144
1997	Atlanta	Tinbat Morgan's Passing	Ruddy Abyssinian	Male	Not listed	Not listed	1245
1998	Kansas City, Missouri	Pajean's Bougalie	Cream/ White Bi-Color Persian	Male	Pamela and Jean Bassett Baton Rouge, Louisiana	Not listed	1244
1999	Kansas City	Noblessa's Peace Maker of Stunning	Red Persian	Male (Neutered)	Kris Vanderbeck – Charlevoix, Michigan	Not listed	Over 1300
2000	Kansas City	Wishes Lyric	Copper-eyed White Persian	Female	Connie Stewart Temple City, California	Same	1300
2001	Houston	CO-MC Candy Kisses of Caliente	Black/ White Manx	Spay	Richard and Terry Brown – Grand Prairie, Texas, and Jeanne McPhee – Houston	Not listed	1000
2002	Houston	Catsafrats Shine On of Agonistes	Black Persian	Male	John Ramirez, Ken White, and Donna & Bruce Isenberg – all Culver City, California	Not listed	Over 1000
2003	Houston	Ruemerz Walk This Way of Teahs	Seal Point Himalayan Persian	Male	Donna Debelius and Tim Steiner – Linthicum, Maryland	Not listed	Over 900
2004	Houston	Buphar's Beyonce of Inthewind	Dilute Calico Persian	Female	Maurice Ruble, Jr, and Linda Fisher – Parkville, Missouri	Not listed	Over 700
2005	San Mateo, California	One-O-One Mascalzone Latino	Black Exotic Shorthair	Male	Marcela Marenco – Santa Margherita Ligure, Italy	Not listed	823
2006	San Mateo	Jadon Comefly With Me of Kenkat	Blue Persian	Spay	Donna Cook, Susan Cook Henry, and Leah Fowler – all from Warrenton, Virginia	Not listed	721
2007	Not held.						
2008	Atlanta	Kuorii Santos of Cuzzoe	Black Persian	Male	Eric Valencia and Justin Pelletier – Raleigh, North Carolina, and Linda Accomb – Fallbrook, California	Paolo Carnevaletti – Italy	729
2009	Atlanta	Kuorii Gorilla of Cuzzoe	Black Persian	Male	Eric Valencia and Justin Pelletier – Raleigh, North Carolina	Paolo Carnevaletti – Italy	630
2010	Cancelled.						
2011	Indianapolis	Rhamjoge Better Believe It	Calico Persian	Spay	Matthew and DeLinda Pearson	Not listed	N/A
2012	Columbus OH	Wild Rain Let's Dance of Dotdotdot	Chocolate spotted Ocicat	Male	Roger and Nancy Brown and David and Carol Freels	Not listed	NA
2013	Novi MI	Belamy Desiderata of Wishes	Calico Persian	Female	Connie Stewart, B. Mayes, D. Adler	Not listed	N/A
2014	Oaks PA	Velvetkist Pack'N Heat of Krimpurrs	Cream and White Persian	Neuter	Beth Holly and Noralyn Heisig	Noralyn Heisig- Maryland	N/A
2015	Oaks PA	Briar-Mar's Good to Be Me	Red and White Classic Tabby with White Manx	Male	Omar Gonzalez and Gary Veach	Omar Gonzalez, Gary Veach, and Suki Lee	N/A
2016	Novi MI	Cinema's Liberace of Calcat	White Persian	Neuter	Deutsch, Hardeman, Ury, Lewis, Wardlaw	Blake Myers and Dennis Adler	N/A
2017	Portland OR	Velvetkist Don't Touch My Tutu	Dilute Calico Persian	Female kitten	Noralyn Heisig	Noralyn Heisig	N/A
2018	Cleveland OH	Briar-Mar's Mockingjay of Deydream	Brown patched tabby and White van Manx	Female	Erin and Joy Yoders-Day		N/A
2019	Cleveland OH	Pinkpawpal Cassiopeia	Brown patched tabby and White Persian	Female	Pattama Weeranon and Chate Ruengruglikit	Pattama Weeranon and Chate Ruengruglikit	N/A
2020	Not held.						
2021	Not held.						
2022	Not held.						
2023	Cleveland OH	Omnia Mea Kot Da Vinci of AbyCastle	Ruddy Abyssinian	Male	Lauren Castle Flynn and Natalya Timashkova	Olga Beresneva	N/A
2024	Cleveland OH	Gemquest My Pet Dragon	Red and white bicolor Persian	Male	Eric Simpson	Eric Simpson, Robert Selman, Cynthia A. Lewis, Beth Feininger	N/A
2025	Cleveland OH	Burmania Pepin of Elessar	Black Bombay	Male	Isabelle Marchand, Mireille Sicart	Vivian Baylor, Isabelle Marchand	N/A

== Official Sites ==
CFA International Show website CFA Facebook page

== See also ==
- Supreme Cat Show
