= LaPerm =

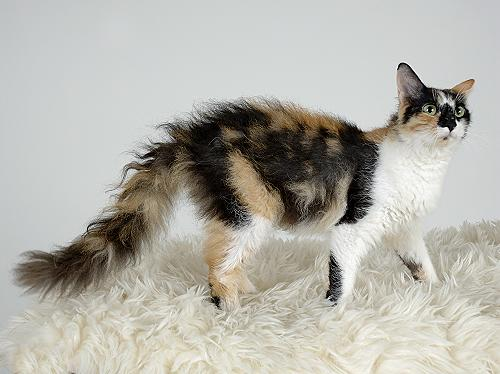
- Calico LaPerm cat
- Origin: United States

Breed standards
- CFA: standard
- FIFe: standard
- TICA: standard
- WCF: standard
- ACF: standard
- GCCF: standard
- Other: WCF(Shorthair); SACC

The LaPerm is a breed of cat. A LaPerm's fur is curly (hence the name "perm"), with the tightest curls being on the throat and on the base of the ears. LaPerms come in many colors and patterns. LaPerms generally have a very affectionate personality.

== Breed profile ==
The LaPerm is a rex breed which originated in the United States and is now present in many other countries worldwide. The breed is genetically unique and not related to any other rex cat varieties, having a dominant gene causing their curly coats. They have an elegant and athletic build and are affectionate, active, and outgoing in character. They are reputed to be hypoallergenic cats, provoking a significantly lower level of an allergic response in humans than normal cats. They are also often described as low-shedding. Their most significant feature is their coat, which is made up of soft waves, curls, and ringlets, resembling a shaggy perm.

== History ==
The LaPerm originated in the early 1980s from a spontaneous mutation among farm cats. The breed founders were Linda and Richard Koehl of The Dalles, Oregon. Their cat Speedy gave birth to a curly-coated kitten named Curly, the foundation cat to which all LaPerms trace their lineage. Over the following decade, a largely free-breeding colony of curly-coated cats developed on the property before the Koehls contacted members of the cat fancy and began a formal breeding program. The breed was named after its curly coat, which resembles a shaggy perm. The name follows the Chinookan tradition of adopting French words while incorporating the definite article to create a new word; for example, in Chinook Wawa 'pipe' is lapeep and 'apple' is lapom (la pipe and la pomme, respectively, in French).

== Description ==
The LaPerm is described as a moderate breed with no extreme features, while retaining its original type. The coat, however, is distinctive. The breed standard describes a medium-sized, muscular foreign-type body with relatively long legs and neck. The head is a modified wedge with rounded contours and a muzzle slightly broader than the wedge. In profile, the nose is straight, with a break between the eyes leading to a slightly flat forehead. LaPerms also have a broad nose, flared ears, and medium to large almond-shaped eyes.

Like other rex breeds, all colors and patterns are acceptable. Tabbies, reds, and tortoiseshell patterns are common, reflecting the breed's origins. Some less common colors seen in the breed's early days were later selected for, including lilac, chocolate, and colorpoint. Recognized patterns include ticked tabby, shaded patterns, and pointed varieties; the LaPerm is also showable in the Karpati pattern.

The coat is described as having a textured feel rather than a silky one, with a slight “drag” to the touch, similar to mohair. It is usually soft, although shorthairs tend to have a crisper texture than longhairs. The coat is loose and springy and stands away from the body, without a thick undercoat. Coat length and fullness can vary with the season and the maturity of the cat, but the coat is essentially wavy or curly, with the longest and most defined curls often seen in the ruff and around the neck. There may also be longer curly fur inside the ears, tufts at the ear tips, and longer, silky hair on the backs of the ears (“ear muffs”). Longhairs have a curly, plumed tail, while shorthairs have tails sometimes described as bottlebrush-like, and both have long, curled whiskers. The coat may also form a natural parting along the back.

== United States ==
The first LaPerm cats were those belonging to the breed founders, Linda and Dick Koehl, on their farm in Oregon. Other breeders who worked with the Koehls during the breed's early development in the United States included Solveig Pfleuger (Manawyddan), a geneticist and cat show judge who chaired The International Cat Association's Genetics Committee, Anne D Lawrence (Uluru), Beth Fillman (Calicorose), and Dee Borgardt (Deebor and Dairyland). Additional breeders involved in the early breeding program included Pete Meisinger & Donna Lawry (Woodlandacre and Hattkatts), Maureen Neidhardt (Lakotaspirit), Lynne Daggett (Lowriders), and Mary Sharum (Sekani). The LaPerm Society of America (LPSA) was formed in 1997 and became affiliated with the Cat Fanciers' Association (CFA) in 2000. The LPSA states that it is dedicated to furthering the breed's advancement in CFA and other registries.

LPSA members who contributed to the breed's early development and whose cattery prefixes appear in LaPerm pedigrees include A. (Anne) D. Lawrence (Uluru), Erika Fetz (Vankkadia), Cheryl Cook (PacificGem), Diane Dunn (Lakme), Andrea Brew (Moonrise), Sandy Brew (Sunfall), Dennis Ganoe (Dennigan), and Debbie Estep (Shoalwater). The International Cat Association (TICA) granted the LaPerm championship status in 2003; a cat described as the first TICA LaPerm champion is Dennigan French Maid of Shoalwater, bred by Dennis Ganoe and owned by Debbie Estep. CFA granted LaPerm championship status beginning in May 2008. The first champion was Ch Sunfall's BC Kahaha Towanjila. The first grand was Grand Premier Uluru BC Cloudfeet of CavalierCats owned by Cathy Hurley (July 11, 2009).

== United Kingdom ==
The first LaPerm imported into the United Kingdom was a female, Champion Uluru BC Omaste Po of Quincunx, a lilac tortie and white longhair bred in the United States by A. (Anne) D. Lawrence and Maureen Neidhardt. She was imported by Anthony Nichols (Quincunx) on 23 May 2002. Because the Pet Travel Scheme (PETS) had not yet been expanded to include the United States, Omaste first went to the Netherlands and stayed with Dutch breeder Corine Judkins to qualify for a pet passport before Nichols collected her. While there, Judkins arranged for Omaste to be mated, and Omaste arrived in the UK pregnant. Her litter of five kittens (born 2 June 2002) became foundation stock for the UK breeding program.

Further imports followed, including cats from Europe, New Zealand, and the United States. Judy Whiteford (Aswani) and Kate Munslow (Canonna) were involved from the first litter and later imported additional cats. Corine Judkins (Crearwy) subsequently moved to Wales with her cats, including the stud that sired the first UK litter. Additional breeders who contributed to the UK breeding program and whose lines appear in UK pedigrees include Edwina Sipos (Cicada), Penni Cragg (Wakanda), June Gillies (Gallego), Kate Ekanger (Cloudborn), Sue Amor (Amorcatz), and Sue Pyrke (Bane). The UK breeding program has focused on advancing generations from outcrosses by combining outcross, established, and imported lines.

The UK now has an active LaPerm breeding program and is the home of the LaPerm Cat Club. The breed progressed through the Governing Council of the Cat Fancy (GCCF) recognition stages between 2004 and 2012 and is exhibited at GCCF cat shows, including the LaPerm Cat Club's annual show. In 2004, the breed gained Preliminary Recognition, and the LaPerm Cat Club was formed. In June 2008, the LaPerm gained Provisional Recognition in the GCCF, and the first cat to gain an Intermediate Certificate was Aswani Miranna Keys. In June 2012, the LaPerm gained full championship recognition with the GCCF, and the first certificate winner was also Aswani Miranda Keys. The first LaPerm to become a GCCF champion was a female, Ballego Happy-Gladys, who went on to also become the first Grand Champion, and the first LaPerm to become a GCCF premier was Pr Wakanda Harriet Potter. The first male champion was Ch Quincunx Umberto Ecarl. The first LaPerm with an Imperial title was also Aswani Miranda Keys, the title gained at the first LaPerm Cat Club breed show. The first male LaPerm with an Imperial title was Imperial Grand Premier Cloudborn Barb Dwyer, bred by Kate Ekanger and owned by Nicola and Roy Lovell.

== Around the world ==
Breeding programs for LaPerms have spread to a number of countries outside of the United States. One account identifies early introductions to Canada by Constance Sansoucy and Martine Sansoucy (Butterpaws), to New Zealand by Twink McCabe (Coiffurr) and Glynne Jackson (Wakijaki), to Australia by Christine Brelsford (Curlz) and later by Anne-Louise Magee (Frisson), to South Africa by Johan Lamprecht (Les Beaux Chats) and later by Grant Leih (Silkenclaw).

Exports from the United States began in the late 1990s; a The International Cat Association (TICA) LaPerm breed presentation notes exports to Japan in 1997–1998. A timeline published by the LaPerm Cat Club also lists 1997 as the year the first LaPerm arrived in Japan. A breed profile by A. D. Lawrence notes that LaPerms became established in several countries, including Germany, South Africa, the Netherlands, Japan, England, and New Zealand, and describes European Champion Uluru BC Wiyaka as the first LaPerm champion. In Germany, early imports are described as including Ch Uluru BC Wiyaka, while the breeding program there is associated with Sabine Albrecht (Isanyati) and Sylvie Groenveld (Smeralda's). In the Netherlands, early imports went to Corine Judkins (Crearwy) and a breed club was established (LaPerm Raskatten Vereniging), with cattery prefixes that appear in pedigrees including Frank Stapel and Rina Stapel (Taricats), Karin Langeveld (Takoda), and Angela Bruynswyck (Brunswick's).

The first Scandinavian breeder is identified as Elinore Kopp (Shangri-La) in Sweden, who imported Grand Champion Quincunx Qinkifurr and Champion Crearwy BC Madryn Merch Cari from the UK. The first Russian breeder is identified as Svetlana Ponomareva (Russicurl). The first LaPerm in Taiwan is identified as Triple Tiara Newron, bred by Yumi Masuda and imported from Japan by Archi Wang. Provisional recognition was granted by Fédération Internationale Féline (FIFe) in 2013, effective 1 January 2014, and full recognition was granted in 2015. One account identifies Champion S*Bla Katten KombiSmart as the first titled LaPerm in FIFe.

== Breeding policies ==
Breeding policies vary between registries, but several permit controlled outcrossing to maintain genetic diversity within the breed. Approved outcrosses depend on the registry: The International Cat Association permits outcrossing to non-breed domestic longhair and shorthair cats, the Cat Fanciers' Association allows domestic longhair and shorthair outcrosses subject to its registration rules and timelines, and the Governing Council of the Cat Fancy permits a small list of pedigree breeds as well as domestic longhair and shorthair cats.

When outcrossing to non-pedigree domestic cats, breeding guidance recommends selecting healthy cats of moderate type that closely match the desired LaPerm look and avoiding overly thick coats. This reflects the breed's origin in a population of non-pedigree cats and is described as a way to introduce fresh bloodlines (“hybrid vigour”) into the gene pool.

In the UK, registration rules can affect how kittens from outcross matings are recorded and shown. The GCCF breeding policy notes that the full register is reserved for LaPerms with three preceding generations of LaPerm-to-LaPerm breeding; cats with a domestic parent or grandparent are recorded on a reference register, and kittens become eligible for showing once the domestic cat is in the third generation (great-grandparent), with unknown ancestry pushed beyond the three-generation pedigree. However, in some countries, such as the UK, there can be legal complications to selling kittens from such matings as pedigrees because of the Trades Description Act 1968, through which it has been established that the legal definition of a pedigree cat in the UK is normally one with a fully recorded three-generation pedigree. After outcrossing to a cat of unknown parentage, at least three generations must be bred to establish a full pedigree record.

In TICA outcrossing has mainly been with the domestic short-haired cat and domestic long-haired cat, although registration rules do allow other breeds to be used and bred down from towards the F3 generation, which is eligible for entry in TICA cat shows.

In Cat Fanciers' Association (CFA) breeders used the Ocicat for two years, terminating on 1 May 2002; LaPerms registered during this period were permitted to have an Ocicat parent, and by extension, one or two Abyssinian grandparents, as the Abyssinian is an approved outcross of the Ocicat. Currently, CFA breeders may only use non-pedigree domestic cats, and after 2025, no outcrosses will be permitted in CFA. However, CFA accepts LaPerms for both breeding and showing with other breeds in their pedigrees if they are imported from another registry.

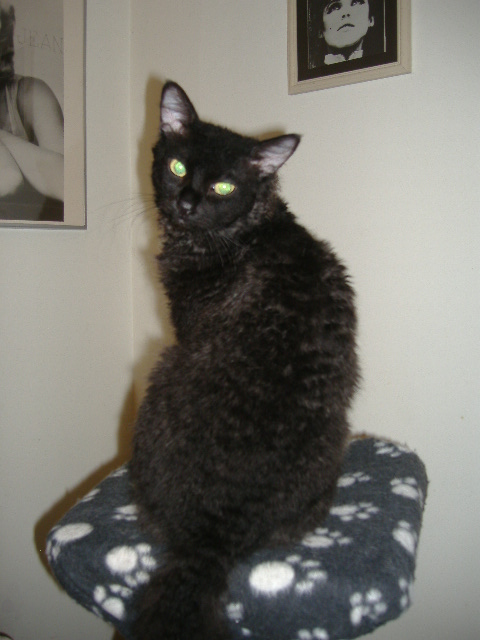
Black LaPerm

The GCCF has the most strict of the registration policies and only LaPerms with a full three-generation pedigree (i.e., parents, grandparents, and great-grandparents) of the only LaPerm to LaPerm breeding are permitted on the full register. Only LaPerms or cats from a list of approved breeds are permitted in the 4th and 5th generations. Cats with non-approved breeds anywhere within their five-generation pedigrees, particularly those with other rex genes, cannot be registered as LaPerms. In order not to cause any damaging restriction to the breed's genepool, a supplementary register also exists for the registration of LaPerms bred as part of an outcross breeding program. LaPerms can only be registered on the supplementary register if, within their five-generation pedigrees, only LaPerms and cats from the approved outcross list are present. In the GCCF, this list comprises the Somali/Abyssinian, Asian/Tiffanie/(European)Burmese, Ocicat and Tonkinese. Domestic Shorthairs and Domestic Longhairs can be used in outcrossing, but certain restrictions apply, and the initial offspring are placed on the reference register and cannot be shown without first being assessed and approved by three judges. In other registries, the approved list (with some slight variations) is used for outcrossing, and cats of unknown parentage are not always permitted.

In FIFe, which has its most active LaPerm breeders in Sweden and the Netherlands, outcrossing is done on a case-by-case basis. In antipodean countries, Somalis, Tiffanies, and Orientals have also been used, but Domestic Shorthairs and Domestic Longhairs are now the preferred choices of an outcross.

== Gallery ==
LaPerm Photos

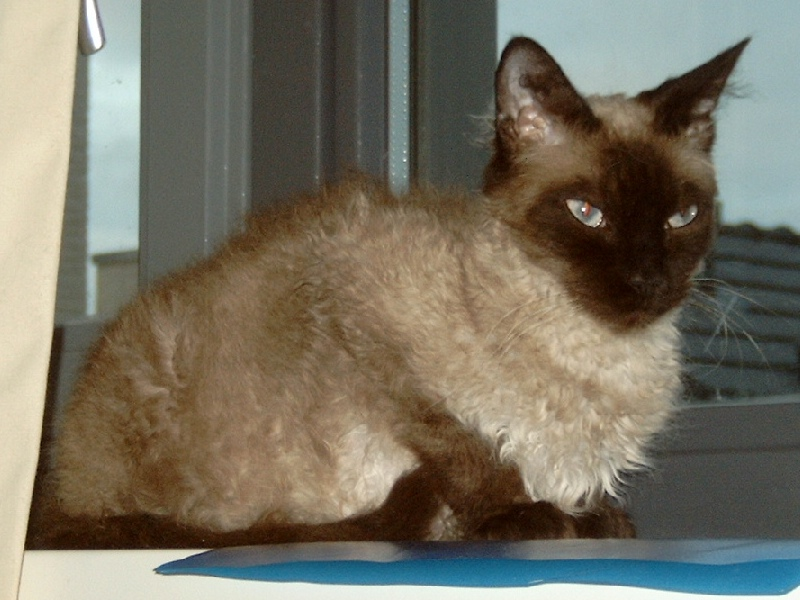
Seal Point LH LaPerm

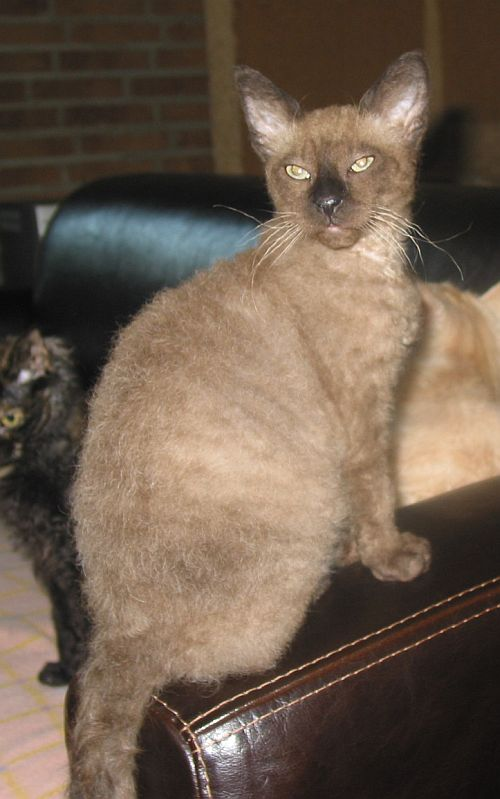
Seal Mink LaPerm

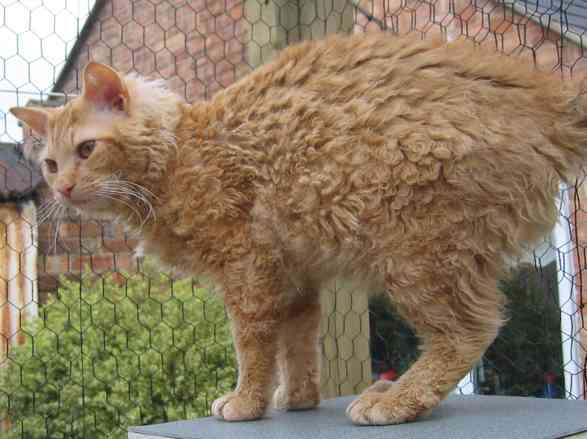
Red Tabby LH LaPerm

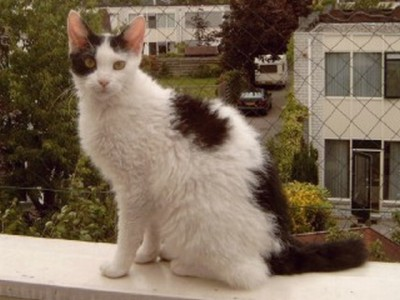
Black and White SH LaPerm

Lilac Point LaPerm Straight Hair Variant

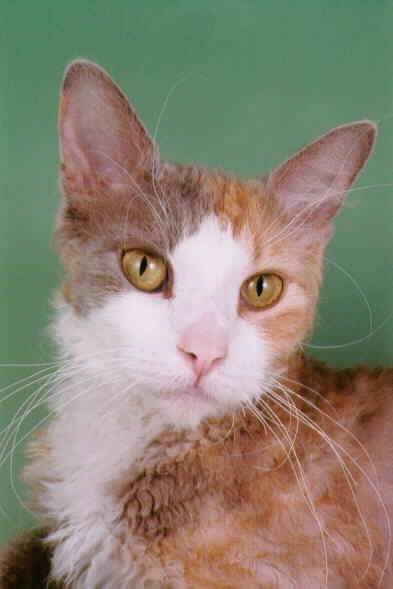
Champion Uluru BC Omaste Po of Quincunx, lilac tortie & white LH LaPerm

== Sources ==
- Morris, Desmond. 1996. Cat World: A Feline Encyclopaedia
- Lawrence, A.D. 2000. The LaPerm Cat: The New Wave In Cats For The Millennium.
- Helgren, J. Anne. 2001. Rex Cats.
- Various. 2007. LaPerm Cats: The Cat To Curl Up With.
