= Domestic Shorthair =

Domestic Shorthair may refer to:

- Domestic short-haired cat, the most common type of non-purebred house cat; "Domestic Shorthair" is a cat show competition category name for this landrace, as used by some but not all fancier organizations which permit them
- American Shorthair, a formal cat breed; "Domestic Shorthair" was its original name in some US-based fancier organizations
