= American Wirehair =

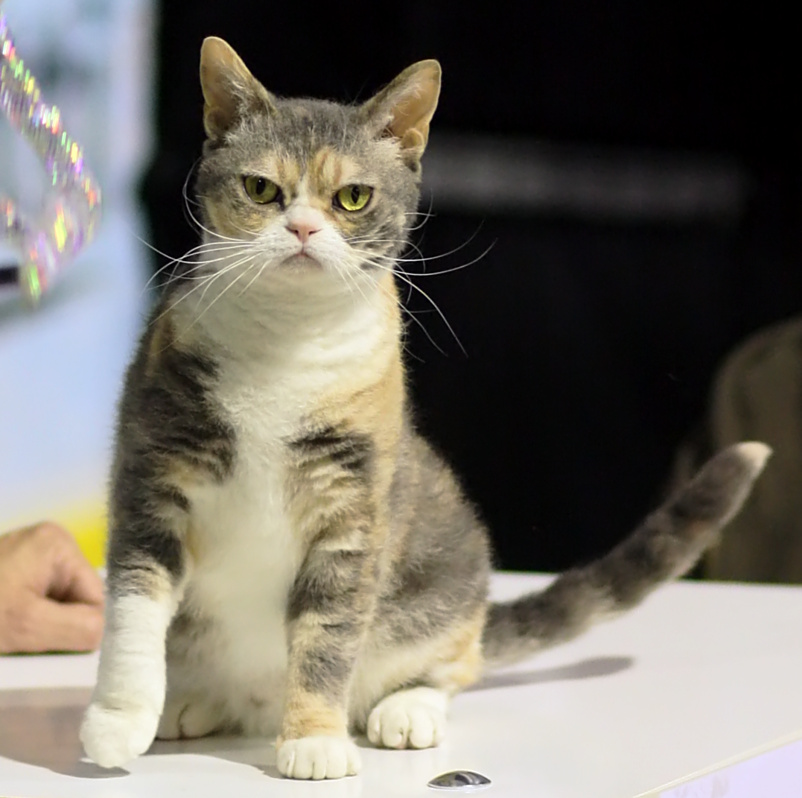
- American Wirehair sitting in a cat show
- Origin: United States

Breed standards
- CFA: standard
- TICA: standard
- ACFA/CAA: standard
- CCA-AFC: standard
- Other: FIFe

The American Wirehair is a breed of domestic cat originating in upstate New York, which is characterized by its wiry fur and crinkly whiskers caused by a genetic mutation. As of 2017, though the breed is well-known, it is ranked as the rarest of the 41 Cat Fanciers' Association breeds.

== History ==
The American Wirehair is a spontaneous mutation of the American Shorthair. It first occurred as a random mutation among a litter of five born to a pair of barn cats in 1966 in Vernon, in upstate New York. This single red-and-white male had wiry fur. The dominant genetic mutation, which causes the wirehair, was found to be different from the Rex mutation of other curly-coated breeds—such as the Cornish Rex or Devon Rex. The owner of the cats called a local breeder of Rex cats, Mrs. Joan O'Shea, to look at the kitten. She bought the kitten for $50, along with one of his normal-coated female littermates, to start a breeding program. The wirehaired male was named Council Rock Farms Adams of Hi-Fi ('Adam' for short), and the female Tip-Top.

Breeding between the two produced wirehaired kittens, many of which were sold off to other interested breeders. As the population grew, cats were exported to Canada and Germany, where they are especially popular. The breed did well, and in 1967 it was recognized by the CFA, and in 1978, it was accepted for championship competition. American Wirehairs have yet to make an appearance in Britain and Australia, among other countries.

== Characteristics ==
American Wirehairs are similar to American Shorthairs, with the exception of a springy, wiry coat, including ear fur, and whiskers. This coat is similar to the wire coats of some dog breeds, such as terriers. Their fur requires little grooming, although lighter cats may require sunblock. Wirehairs are of a moderate, sturdy build, with round heads, high cheekbones, and a pronounced muzzle. Females are generally smaller than males. American Wirehairs display the full spectrum of possible cat coat colors, although Himalayan, Chocolate and Lilac are not accepted for competition. When evaluating this breed, the emphasis is mostly on the quality of the coat - out of a total of 100 points for quality coat, an American Wirehair can get 45. This type of coat is easy to maintain because the gene determining the hardness of the coat is dominant. The Wirehair coat trait is dominant, so any breeding between a Wirehair and another cat can produce wired kittens. Wirehairs have green or golden eyes, except for some white ones that have blue or amber eyes.

=== Behaviour ===
The Wirehair has an even, balanced temperament which is essentially identical to that of its American Shorthair relative. Wirehairs are equally content to play or fall asleep in their owners' laps. They have been described as cute and somewhat humorous. They are gentle and quiet, but also playful and active. They have quiet voices.

== See also ==
- List of cat body-type mutations
- List of cat breeds
