= The International Cat Association =

Worldwide genetic cat registry

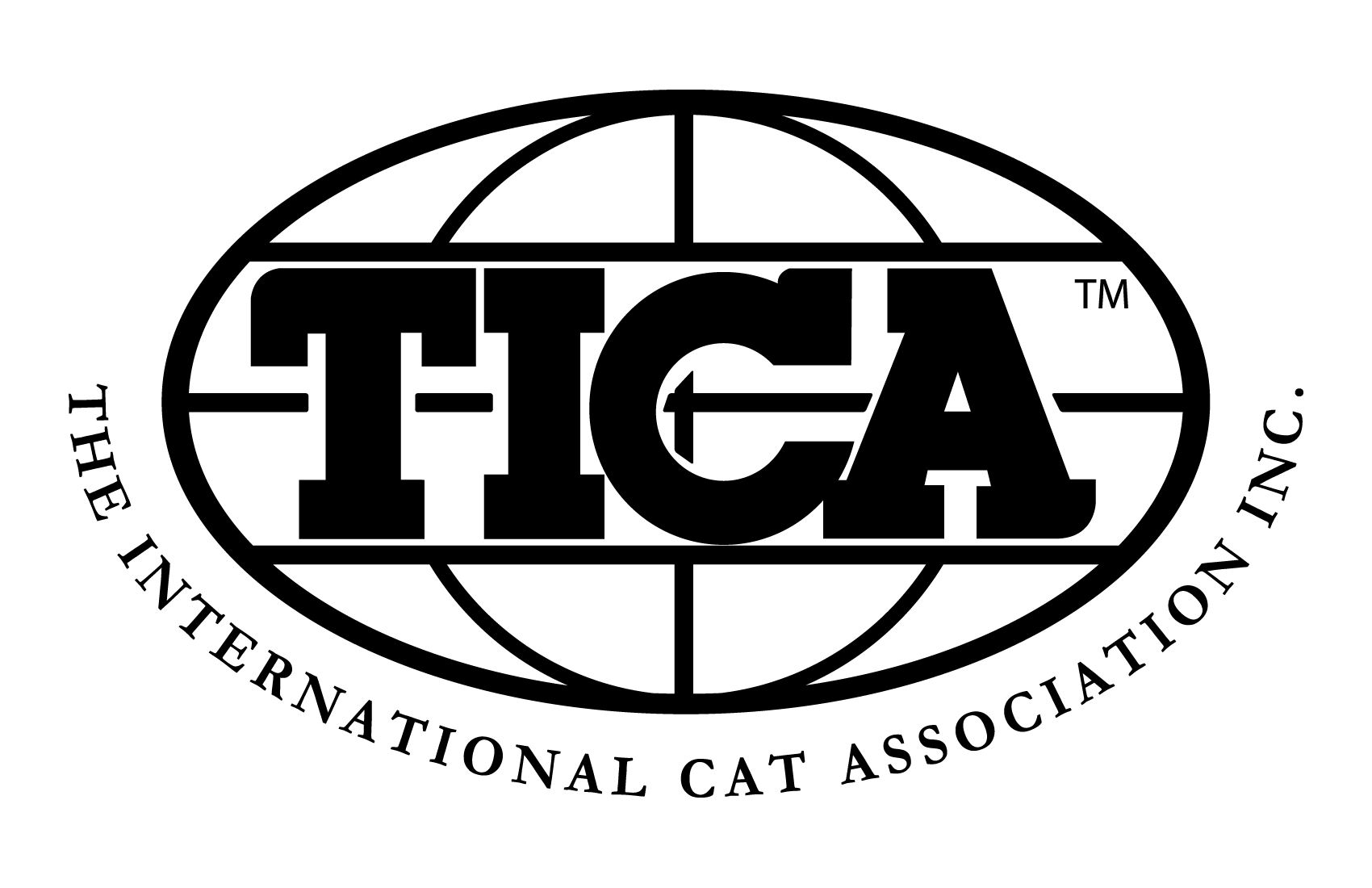
- Abbreviation: TICA
- Formation: 22 June 1979; 47 years ago
- Founders: Georgia Morgan; Larry Paul; Arthel Schuermann
- Founded at: Branson, Missouri, U.S.
- Region served: Worldwide
- Services: Cat pedigree registry
- Members: 4,000
- President: Vicki Jo Harrison
- Vice President: Ralph Stadter
- Board of directors: Akiko Ishimura, Jeff Shi, Liesbeth van Mullem, Kurt Vlach, Nicky Goulter, Liz Brown, Lisa Dickie, Brenda Russo, Carol Barton, Christian Cherau, Elaine Hawksworth-Weitz, Luiz Paulo Faccioli, Jim Armel, Rene Knapp, Laurie Schiff
- Affiliations: World Cat Congress
- Website: www.tica.org

The International Cat Association (TICA) is considered the world's largest genetic cat registry. Originally a North American organization, it now has a worldwide presence. The organization has a genetic registry for pedigreed and household pet cats and is one of the world's largest sanctioning bodies for cat shows. TICA is one of the nine members of the World Cat Congress, making it one of the major and reputable cat registries for pedigree registration of cat breeds worldwide.

== Activities ==
TICA's activities include:

- encouraging its members to be owners, lovers and breeders of cats who work together to promote the preservation of pedigreed cats and the health and welfare of domestic cats
- maintaining a certified pedigree registry
- providing cat shows which promote both pedigreed and non-pedigreed cats
- promoting positive relations between breeders in the US and other countries
- setting up a foundation to encourage research on feline health issues and to provide lists of resource materials on health issues to its members

== TICA catteries ==
Breeding catteries register their cattery name following the TICA naming standards. Certificates are awarded to Outstanding Catteries that meet strict health codes for the cats and their environment. As of December 2024, 33 catteries meet these requirements.

== TICA cat shows ==
TICA administers the rules for the licensing and management of hundreds of cat shows annually in 104 countries. The TICA show season runs from 1 May to 30 April of a given year at which point all Regional and International Award points are reset. All TICA shows are open to the public.

A TICA cat show is a number of smaller shows all running at the same time in various “rings” throughout the show hall. Each ring is run by a licensed TICA judge who evaluates each cat based on a written standard that describes the ideal for each particular breed. Household pets and household pet kittens (cats of random or unknown breeding, or pedigree cats that for one reason or another cannot show in championship classes), are not judged against a standard but instead are evaluated on overall condition, health, appearance and personality.

=== Classes ===
TICA recognizes cats for competition in 8 classes. Each class is judged separately. For example, alters are not judged against kittens. Each cat entered in the show is assigned an identifying number based on its class and coat length so that exhibitors know when their cats are needed in a ring.

Class	Description	Numbers
Kittens	Kittens of breeds and colors recognized by TICA for championship status. Kittens must be between 4 months and 7 months old on the day of the show. Kittens may be whole or spayed/neutered.	Longhair: 1-50; Shorthair: 51-100
Championship	Adult cats of breeds and colors recognized by TICA for championship status. Cats must be 8 months of age or older on the day of the show. In this class the cats can not be spayed or neutered.	Longhair: 101-200; Shorthair: 201-300
Alters	Adult spayed or neutered cats of breeds and colors recognized by TICA for championship status. Alters must be 8 months of age or older on the day of the show.	Longhair: 301-350; Shorthair: 351-400
Household Pet Kittens	Non-pedigree kittens or pedigree kittens that can not be shown in kitten class for some reason. Household Pet Kittens (HHP Kittens) must be between 4 months and 7 months old on the day of the show. HHP Kittens may be whole or spayed/neutered.	Longhair Kittens & Adults: 401-450
Household Pet Adults	Non-pedigree cats or pedigree cats that can not be shown in an adult class for some reason. Household Pets (HHPs) must be 8 months old or older on the day of the show and must be spayed or neutered	Shorthair Kittens & Adults: 451-500
Preliminary New Breed	This is a special class for the evaluation of new breeds. The intent of the new breed classes is the eventual recognition of these breeds for championship competition. Preliminary New Breed is for those breeds who are at the beginning of this process.	501-550
Advanced New Breed	This is a special class for the evaluation of new breeds. The intent of the new breed classes is the eventual recognition of these breeds for championship competition. Advanced New Breed is for those breeds who have demonstrated merit to advance in the program.	551-600
New Traits	This class is for the evaluation of new traits, such as new colors or hair lengths of existing recognized breeds where these traits are not currently recognized for championship competition. The intent of New Traits class is the eventual recognition of these traits for championship competition.	601-650

In the rare instance where there are more cats than fit in the range of numbers, the next class starts with the first available number. For example, if there are 55 longhair kittens, then those kittens are 1-55, the shorthair kittens would start at 56.

=== Rings ===
==== Judging ring ====
A typical judging ring is usually made up of an L- or U-shaped arrangement of cages, with the judge's table in the center. Three people normally work in each judging ring: the judge, clerk and steward.

All TICA judges are trained and licensed to thoroughly evaluate each breed of cat in order of how well they represent their individual breed standard.

The clerk acts as an executive assistant to the judge. They are responsible for the accuracy of all records of the ring. Each clerk keeps a marked catalog of the results of the ring and validates that what the judge writes in their own records is how the awards were presented in their evaluation to the audience.

A steward helps keeps the cages clean and disinfected in between cats in order to prevent illnesses from spreading.

==== Types of rings ====
There are two types of judging rings at TICA shows, Allbreed and Specialty. Allbreed rings will have all longhair cats and shorthair cats within each class judged together in competition with one another. In a Specialty ring, longhair cats within each class are only judged against longhair cats and shorthair cats are only judged against shorthair cats.

Regardless of the ring type, each judge evaluates every cat entered in the show.

=== Process ===
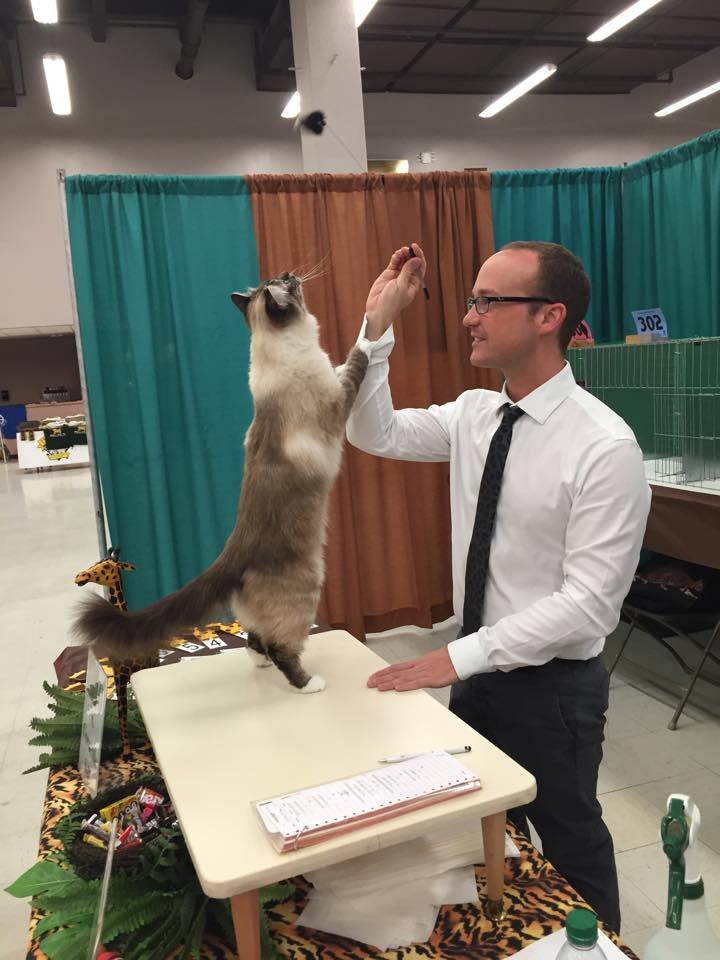
A TICA judge evaluates a 2-year-old Birman Alter at a show in Albuquerque, New Mexico, U.S.

The cat show competition is structured like a pyramid. First, all of the entries are divided into their respective classes. Within each of these classes, cats are called to the judging ring according to breed, division and color/pattern.

The judge handles each cat placed in the judging ring. Each cat is taken from their cage, placed on the judging table and evaluated against the written standard for the breed. Some judges will use toys to get a better look at a cat's eye shape, ear size and placement and overall balance.

Although some associations make a cat's title known, the only information provided to a TICA judge about each cat is its: breed, color, sex and age. The judge has no way of knowing if it is the cat's first show or how it has performed in other rings.

==== Judging pyramid ====
After the judge is done evaluating each cat in a breed group, they will hang a colored ribbon on the cat's cages to award Best of Color and Division. TICA does not have Best of Breed ribbons but the judge will announce their choices and also note their selections in the Judge's Book. The clerk will also write down each of these selections for the record.

Place	Color	Division
Best	Blue	Black
2nd	Red	Purple
3rd	Yellow	Orange
4th	Green	-
5th	White	-

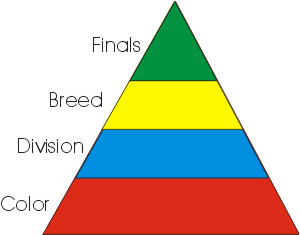
TICA judges narrow down their top cats by deciding Best of Color, Division and Breed out of all the competing cats.

- Best of Color: The judge will first award the best of color through the 5th Best of Color for each breed. For example, if seven blue British Shorthairs are competing; the judge will select and rank five of the seven. The cat is judged against the whole breed standard, not just color. Out of the seven British Shorthairs competing they are judged against how the fulfill the full British Shorthair standard. “Best of Color” does not necessarily mean that the cat has the best blue coat.

All Household Pets and Household Pet Kittens will receive a Best of Color award regardless of how many cats of a particular color there are.

- Best of Division: From the color winners, the judge will select a Best, Second and Third Best of Division. For example, the seven blue British Shorthairs belong to the Traditional Solid Division. Other solid colored British Shorthairs (white, lilac, cream) would also be judged in the Solid Division. Tabbies would be judged in the tabby division and so forth.

Household Pet Kittens do not receive division awards.

- Best of Breed: Once a judge has selected their First through Third of Division cats, they will select Best, Second and Third Best of Breed from all of the breed's divisions.

Household Pet and Household Pet Kittens do not receive breed awards.

===== Finals =====
After the judge has seen all of the cats in a particular class, they decide on their best exhibits of each breed and then ask for them to be returned to the ring for a final. Finals are essentially a "Best in Show" for that particular ring.

Earlier placements are taken into consideration during finals as a cat that came in Second of Breed cannot place higher than a cat who was Best of Breed and so forth.

The judge will then explain their placings – between Top 5 and 10 depending on how many cats are competing. If there are 20 cats or less competing in one class the judge will award a Top 5, 21 cats are a Top 6, and so on, up to 25 cats or more which awards a Top 10. The only exception to this rule is the Household Pet and Household Pet Kitten class where a maximum of 10 places are awarded regardless of the number of cats in competition. So If only 8 Household Pet Kittens/Cats are competing the judge will award 8 placements.

=== Scoring ===
==== Points ====
All points earned are tracked by the TICA Executive Office in Harlingen, Texas. Points are awarded for placing in Color, Division and for each final awarded. Points are calculated ring-by-ring and tracked from the Judge's Book, a copy of which is sent to the Executive Office after a show.

Title points start accumulating with a cat's first adult show. Any balance of points from a previous title will be applied toward the next title. If a Championship Cat is altered it can keep the titles and points won as a whole cat or they can choose to start over.

Points are assigned best on color and division awarded in each ring. Points are not earned for breed placements.

===== Color and division =====
Color	Division	Points
Best	Best	25
2nd	2nd	20
3rd	3rd	15
4th	-	10
5th	-	5

===== Finals =====
Points are also assigned based on the cat's placement in a final. The scores are different between Allbreed and Specialty rings.

Place	Allbreed Points	Specialty Points
Best	200	150
2nd	190	140
3rd	180	130
4th	170	120
5th	160	110
6th	150	100
7th	170	90
8th	130	80
9th	120	70
10th	110	60

For example, if a Chocolate Spotted Ocicat were to be awarded Best of Color and Best of Division, he would earn 50 points. First of color and second of division, would be 45 points and so on. If that same Ocicat were awarded Best Allbreed in a final, they would also earn 200 points on top of the 50 points for Color and Division.

=== Titles ===
Title points are computed by using the final award points plus Best of Color and Best of Division Points. Cats also need to earn a certain number of finals to achieve each title. With the exception of Championship Kittens and Household Pet Kittens, each class has its own set of titles although they are tiered equally and the requirements to reach them do not change. All cats begin their show career as a Novice (NOV), once a show is scored and titles are conferred by the Executive Office, the cat can add the title abbreviation to their registration.

Cats registered in isolated areas which do not see as many shows as other areas (as in Alaska) only require half the point values to achieve the titles and a lower number of finals.

Championship	Alter	Household Pet	Points Needed	Plus	Isolated Area
Champion (CH)	Champion Alter (CHA)	Master (MS)	300	Finals from 4 different judges, one must be AB	Finals from 2 different judges
Grand Champion (GRC)	Grand Champion Alter (GCA)	Grand Master (GRM)	1000	6 finals from 4 different judges, 3 in top 5 SP or top 10 AB	3 finals from 2 different judges, 1 in top 5 SP or top 10 AB
Double Grand Champion (DGC)	Double Grand Champion Alter (DGCA)	Double Grand Master (DGM)	2000	1 final in top 5 SP or top 10 AB as GRC/GRCA/GRM	1 final in top 5 SP or top 10 AB as GRC/GRCA/GRM
Triple Grand Champion (TGC)	Triple Grand Champion Alter (TGCA)	Triple Grand Master (TGM)	3000	1 final in top 5 SP or top 10 AB as a DGC/DGCA/DGM	1 final in top 5 SP or top 10 AB as a DGC/DGCA/DGM
Quadruple Grand Champion (QGC)	Quadruple Grand Champion Alter (QGCA)	Quadruple Grand Master (QGM)	4000	1 final in top 5 SP or top 10 AB as a TRC/TGCA/TGM	1 final in top 5 SP or top 10 AB as a TRC/TGCA/TGM
Supreme Grand Champion (SGC)	Supreme Grand Champion Alter (SGCA)	Supreme Grand Master (SGM)	6000	1 BEST as a QGC/QGCA/QGM	1 BEST as a QGC/QGCA/QGM

Note: The Supreme title cannot be earned on the same day of the show as the Quadruple Title

=== Regional and International Awards ===
All TICA-registered kittens, cats, alters, HHPs and HHP Kittens can compete for Regional and International Awards during the show year. For adult cats, the Top 50 rings are used in computing season scores. For all kittens the top 30 rings are used. If a cat reaches the ring cap, the lowest score will be dropped in favor of a higher score. Points are computed by using the final award points plus cats defeated.

Color and Division points are not used for scoring Regional and International Points.

Regional and international points are computed by using the final award points plus cats defeated. For example, if there were 58 cats competing and your cat got 6th place in an Allbreed final the cat would earn 202 points, 150 (6th place) + 52 (as 5 cats placed higher and you placed higher than 52 of them) = 202 points towards Regional and International Awards. The same rules would apply in a specialty ring using the SP Ring finals chart.

=== Award ceremonies ===
The highest scoring cats, kittens, alters, household pet kittens and household pets are honored with Regional and International awards. Regional awards are presented at an award banquet hosted by each of the TICA regions. International Awards are presented at the Annual Convention and Awards Banquet on Labor Day weekend.

Each region takes turns hosting the Annual Convention. The Annual has previously been hosted in the U.S. in Bellevue, Washington, Worcester, Massachusetts, and Columbus, Ohio, and in Austria in Salzburg, Salzburg. Also presented at the banquet are the Best of Breed Cats for the show season.

== Recognized breeds ==
As the world's largest genetic registry of pedigreed cats, TICA currently recognizes seventy-three breeds of cats for championship competition. In addition, the number of breeds can change as new breeds are developed.

Listed in alphabetical order by breed, as of 2024:

=== Championship breeds ===
Breeds of cats that have been accepted for championship and are recognized as being eligible to compete in TICA sanctioned shows and eligible for appropriate titles and/or computation of Annual Awards. These cats must be eight months of age or more and may be male, female, neuter or spay. Pedigreed kittens (under eight months of age) do not earn titles, but are eligible to compete in TICA sanctioned shows and may earn points towards Annual Awards.

- A - Abyssinian, American Bobtail, American Bobtail Shorthair, American Curl, American Curl Longhair, American Shorthair, American Wirehair, Australian Mist
- B - Balinese, Bengal, Bengal Longhair, Birman, Bombay, British Longhair, British Shorthair, Burmese, Burmilla, Burmilla Longhair
- C - Chartreux, Chausie, Cornish Rex, Cymric
- D - Devon Rex, Donskoy
- E - Egyptian Mau, Exotic Shorthair
- H - Havana, Himalayan
- J - Japanese Bobtail, Japanese Bobtail Longhair
- K - Khao Manee, Korat, Kurilian Bobtail, Kurilian Bobtail Longhair
- L - LaPerm, LaPerm Shorthair, Lykoi
- M - Maine Coon, Maine Coon Polydactyl, Manx, Minuet, Minuet, Munchkin, Munchkin
- N - Nebelung, Norwegian Forest Cat
- O - Ocicat, Oriental Longhair, Oriental Shorthair
- P - Persian, Peterbald, Pixiebob, Pixiebob Longhair
- R - Ragdoll, Russian Blue
- S - Savannah, Scottish Fold, Scottish Fold Longhair, Scottish Straight, Scottish Straight Longhair, Selkirk Rex, Selkirk Rex Longhair, Siamese, Siberian, Singapura, Snowshoe, Somali, Sphynx
- T - Tennessee Rex, Thai, Tonkinese, Toyger, Turkish Angora, Turkish Van

=== Advanced new breeds ===
The second level of the Championship Advancement Class Program. These breeds are eligible to be shown in TICA sanctioned shows but do not earn titles or points towards Annual Awards and must follow specific rules to be eligible for championship status.

- H - Highlander, Highlander Shorthair
- S - Serengeti

=== Preliminary new breeds ===
The beginning level of the Championship Advancement Class Program. These breeds are eligible to be shown in TICA sanctioned shows but do not earn titles or points towards Annual Awards and must follow specific rules to be eligible for the next step in achieving championship status.

- A - Aphrodite Longhair, Aphrodite
- M - Minskin
- T - Tennessee Rex, Tennessee Rex Shorthair, Toybob Longhair, Toybob

=== Registration only ===
TICA accepts cats for registration only. Under this status the association agrees to provide registration facilities for development of the breed in question. There is no guarantee that TICA will accept the breed for advancement.

- O - Ojos Azules
- S - Sokoke

=== Non-championship breeds ===
This class consists of Household Pets and Household Pet Kittens. Household pets earn titles comparable to Championship cats and are eligible to compete in TICA sanctioned shows and may earn points towards Annual Awards. Household pet kittens do not earn titles, but are eligible to compete in TICA sanctioned shows and may earn points towards Annual Awards.

=== Experimental breeds ===
The Experimental Record is for tracking the parentage of cats not yet recognized in TICA for the Stud Book or Foundation Registries. Tracking of these proposed breeds will provide a precise chronicle of the proposed breed's progress and development. Records will include analysis of any genetic problems inherent in a particular breeding program thus proving or disproving its future acceptance as a viable, healthy breed.

== Regions ==
TICA is divided into of 14 regions. Regions are grouped together geographically.

=== Americas ===
- Great Lakes - Illinois, Indiana, Iowa, Kentucky, Manitoba, Canada, Michigan, Minnesota, Missouri, Nebraska, North Dakota, Nunavut Canada, Ohio, Saskatchewan Canada, South Dakota, Wisconsin
- Mid Atlantic - Delaware, District Of Columbia, Maryland, New Jersey, Pennsylvania, Virginia, West Virginia
- Mid Pacific - Northern California, Nevada, Utah
- Northeast - APO, Connecticut, Maine, Massachusetts, New Brunswick Canada, New Hampshire, New York, Newfoundland Canada, Nova Scotia Canada, Ontario Canada, Prince Edward Island Canada, Quebec, Rhode Island, Vermont
- Northwest - Alaska, Alberta Canada, British Columbia Canada, Idaho, Montana, N W Territory Canada, Oregon, Washington, Wyoming, Yukon
- South America - Argentina, Bolivia, Brazil, Chile, Colombia, Costa Rica, Ecuador, El Salvador, Panama, Paraguay, Peru, Uruguay, Venezuela
- South Central - Arkansas, Colorado, Kansas, Louisiana, Mexico, Oklahoma, Texas
- Southeast - Alabama, Bermuda, Florida, Georgia, Guadeloupe, Martinique, Mississippi, North Carolina, Puerto Rico, South Carolina, Tennessee, Us Virgin Islands
- Southwest - Arizona, Hawaii, Southern California, New Mexico

=== Asia ===
Brunei, China, Hong Kong, Indonesia, Israel, Japan, Kuwait, Malaysia, North Korea, Pakistan, Philippines, Qatar, Saudi Arabia, Singapore, South Korea, Taiwan, Thailand, UAE

=== Europe ===
- Northern Europe - Belgium, Belarus, Denmark, Estonia, Finland, Germany, Latvia, Liechtenstein, Lithuania, Luxembourg, Norway, Poland, Russia, Sweden, The Netherlands, Ukraine
- Southern Europe - Albania, Austria, Bosnia and Herzegovina, Bulgaria, Croatia, Cyprus, Czech Republic, France, Gibraltar, Greece, Hungary, Italy, Macedonia, Malta, Moldova, Monaco, Montenegro, Portugal, Romania, Serbia, Slovakia, Slovenia, Spain, Switzerland, Turkey
- Western Europe - Channel Islands, England, Iceland, Ireland, Isle of Man, Northern Ireland, Scotland, Wales

=== International ===
Australia, New Caledonia, New Zealand, South Africa

== TICA Trend ==
The International Cat Association publishes the TICA Trend, an official bi-monthly magazine that is distributed to the association's members as part of their membership. The Trend contains current TICA news, a calendar of upcoming shows, and articles on cat health and care, breeding and showing. The magazine also spotlights cats that have earned titles at shows. The Trend also contains board of director meeting minutes, financial reports for each region, and a list of all licensed and trainee clerks and judges. Judith Milling is the current editor of the Trend.
