= Toybob =

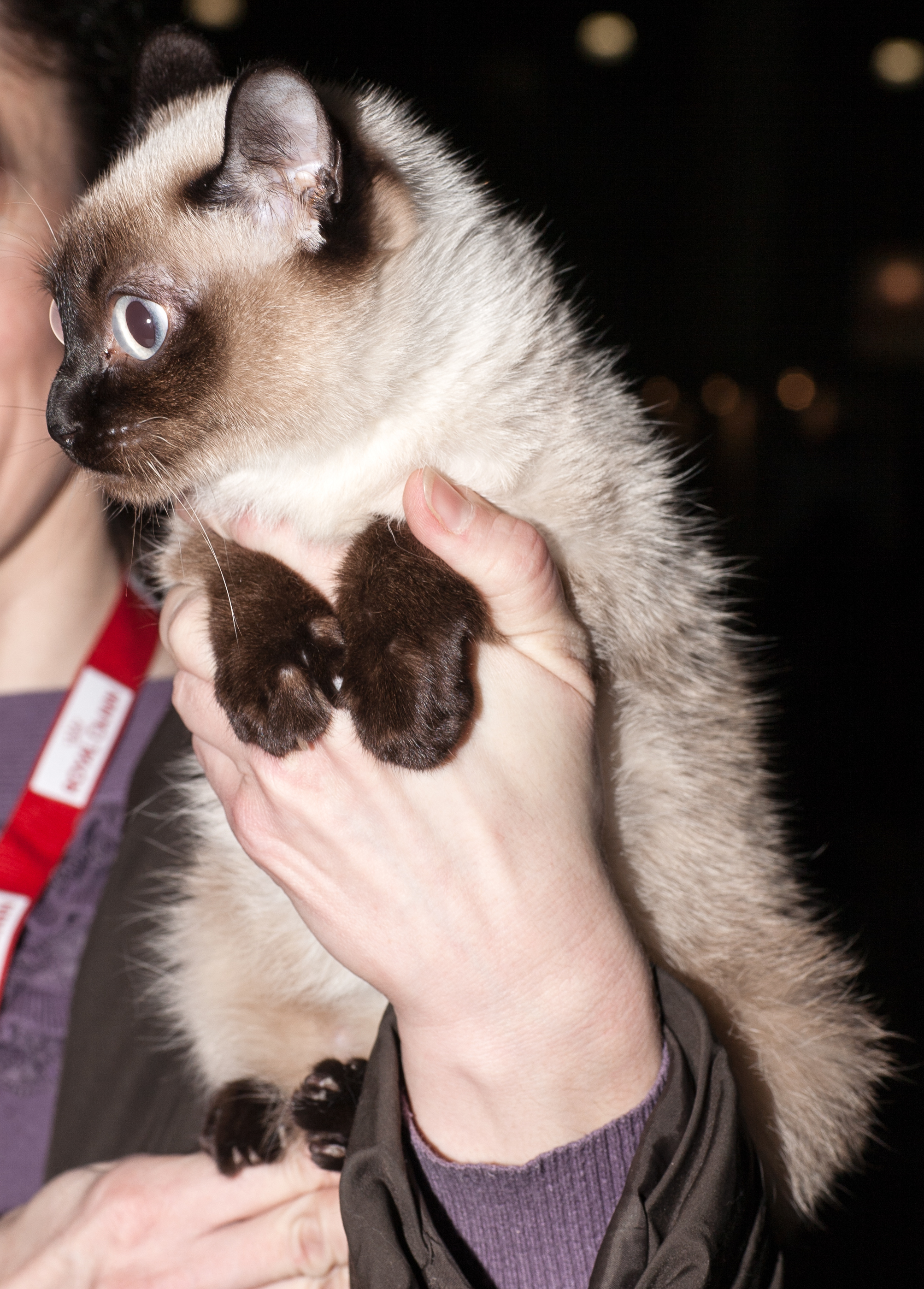
- Seal point Toybob
- Other names: Scyth-Toy-Bob, Skif-Thai-Don
- Origin: Russia

Breed standards
- CFA: standard
- ACFA/CAA: standard

The Toybob is a breed cat distinct for its small size and short kinked tail that originated in Russia. It is often considered to be "the smallest breed of cat" due to a spontaneous mutation.

It bears the Siamese colourpoint mutation gene.

== Recognition ==
In 2009 the Toybob was placed by The International Cat Association (TICA) into the "Experimental" category. In January 2017 the Toybob was given "Registration" status by TICA, allowing for registration facilities but with no guarantee of further advancement.

It was recognised by the Cat Fanciers' Association in 2019.

== See also ==
- List of experimental cat breeds
- List of cat breeds
