= Cat Fanciers' Association =

American Cat Registry

- The Cat Fanciers’ Association, Inc.
- Abbreviation: CFA
- Predecessor: American Cat Association
- Formation: 1906; 120 years ago
- Founded at: Manasquan, New Jersey, U.S.
- Type: Nonprofit
- Legal status: Foundation
- Headquarters: Alliance, Ohio, U.S.
- Region served: Asia, Europe, North America
- President: Richard Mastin
- Vice President: Russell Webb
- Website: cfa.org

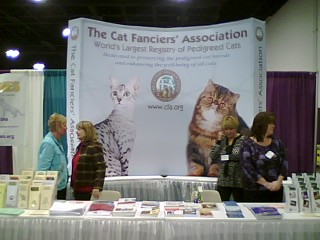
Cat Fanciers' Association (CFA) booth at the 2008 CFA International Cat Show in Atlanta, U.S., on November 22, 2008.

The Cat Fanciers' Association (CFA) was established in the United States in 1906. The CFA is currently the world's largest registry of pedigreed cats. It is one of the nine members of the World Cat Congress, making it one of the major and reputable cat registries for pedigree registration of cat breeds worldwide.

Originally headquartered in Manasquan, New Jersey, the CFA moved to Alliance, Ohio in 2010. The association's stated mission is preserving and promoting pedigreed breeds of cats while also enhancing the well-being of all cats. CFA's first licensed cat shows were held in Buffalo, New York and Detroit, Michigan in 1906. The association today has a known presence in Europe, China, and Japan along with its well-established activity in the United States and Canada.

In 2022, CFA recognized 42 breeds for its Championship Class and three in its non-competitive classes (the Khao Manee, Lykoi, and Toybob). The current president of the CFA is Richard Mastin.

== List of CFA-recognized pedigreed cats ==
By alphabetical order according to breed division:

- A - Abyssinian cat - American Bobtail - American Curl - American Shorthair - American Wirehair
- B - Balinese (including Javanese) - Bengal - Birman - Bombay - British Shorthair - Burmese - Burmilla
- C - Chartreux - Colorpoint Shorthair - Cornish Rex
- D - Devon Rex
- E - Egyptian Mau - European Burmese - Exotic
- H - Havana Brown
- J - Japanese Bobtail
- K - Khao Manee - Korat
- L - LaPerm - Lykoi
- M - Maine Coon - Manx
- N - Norwegian Forest Cat
- O - Ocicat - Oriental
- P - Persian (including Himalayan)
- R - Ragamuffin - Ragdoll - Russian Blue
- S - Scottish Fold - Selkirk Rex - Siamese - Siberian - Singapura - Somali - Sphynx
- T - Toybob - Tonkinese - Turkish Angora - Turkish Van

== Services ==
The CFA offers a number of services to catteries, purebred feline owners, and the general public. One service the CFA offers is certified pedigree lists for registered cats. Registered cat pedigrees going back from three to six generations are available.

== Catteries ==
Breeding catteries register their cattery name following the CFA naming standards. Certificates are awarded to Catteries of Excellence that meet strict health codes for the cats and their environment. As of this writing, 40 catteries meet these requirements. Riversiderags is the only Ragdoll cattery at present to make this award from both TICA and CFA.

PaJean Cattery, an iconic cattery devoted to Persian cats, has produced the most long-haired Grand Champions in the world and the most Cat of the Year honors. The cattery was founded by Pamela Bassett and her mother, the late Jean Bassett.

== Other activities ==
CFA recognizes 42 pedigreed breeds for showing in the Championship Class and three breeds as Miscellaneous (this became effective with the 2016–17 show season). Since 1994, the CFA has hosted the CFA International Cat Show, described as the "Rolls-Royce of cat shows", the largest of its kind in the U.S.. Despite being cancelled in 2007 and 2010, the CFA International made a comeback in 2011 as the CFA World Show in Indianapolis, Indiana and has boasted renewed entries and interest since its re-branding and the acquisition of corporate sponsorships. In 2015, the show's name was restored to the CFA International Cat Show.

Other activities of the CFA include setting breed standards and offering breeding guidelines, training show judges, promoting and inspecting catteries, supporting and publicizing research on cat health issues, influencing legislative issues, providing disaster relief and breed rescue programs, publishing books and magazines and informing the general public on topics relating to cats.

== Description of CFA cat shows and titles ==
While no two shows are identical, CFA cat shows follow certain procedures and guidelines:

A CFA cat show actually consists of a number of simultaneous cat shows running at the same time within the same place. Depending on the size of the show, there are anywhere from 4 to 12 "rings" (or miniature shows) which generally run 1 to 2 days in length. Each "ring" has its own judge who independently scores cats and awards the top 10 places (or top 15 depending on the size of the show).

Rings are of two kinds:

- "All Breed" rings allow cats of every breed approved by the CFA to be judged...from Sphynx to Persian and everything in between.
- "Specialty" rings separate out cats into one of two types: the "Longhair" category include cats like Persians, Maine Coons, and other long-haired cats, while the "Shorthair" include Burmese, Sphynx, American Shorthair and other short-haired cats.

Points are awarded to cats based on percentages of the number of cats "beaten" in the ring, determined according to their placement in the final (for national/regional points) or out of the number of champions/premiers in show (for grand points).

- At the end of each show season, the top 25 cats in the organization with the most points for the show season are awarded the coveted title of "National Winner" (NW).
- Cats in the top 25 of their "region" are awarded the prestigious title of "Regional Winner" (RW). There are nine regions in the CFA, with regions 1-7 consisting of various American states and Canadian provinces, divided by geography and relative population, while regions 8 and 9 consist of the entirety of Japan and Europe, respectively. All other countries (including China) compete under the International Division.
- Adult cats who are not neutered and achieve a point ranking of over 200 points are awarded the title of "Grand Champion".
- Neutered cats can be shown in a class called "Premier" and achieve the title of "Grand Premier".
- Cats which meet the standards of the breed as confirmed by six judges at one show are awarded a "winners ribbon" by each judge and are awarded the lowest title of "Champion".
- Kittens from the age of 4 to 8 months compete in a separate "Kitten" class, and are also able to achieve the title of "National Winner" and "Regional Winner", but can not become Grand Champions or Grand Premiers until reaching adulthood at 8 months of age.
- Adult cats being shown at a show with no existing title are referred to as "Open", although they are still eligible to compete for grand points.

== See also ==
- List of cat breeds
- List of cat registries
