= Exotic Shorthair =

Breed of cat

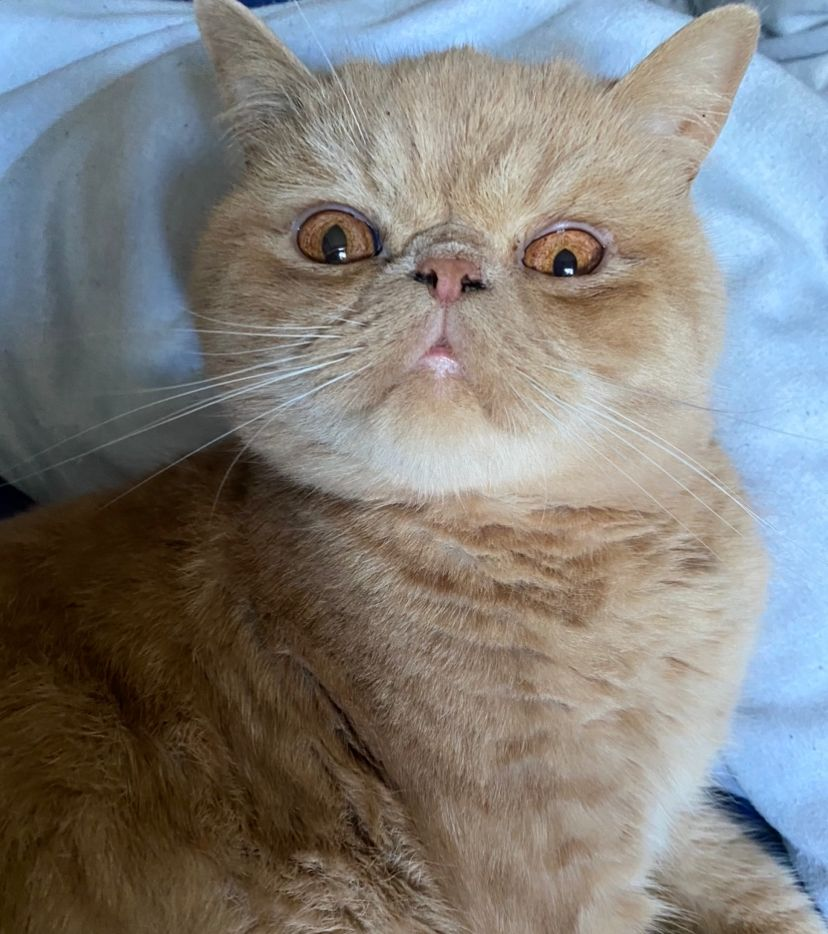
- Ginger Exotic Shorthair
- Origin: United States
- Foundation bloodstock: American Shorthair; Persian Cat; Burmese (occasionally); Russian Blue (occasionally)

Breed standards
- CFA: standard
- FIFe: standard
- TICA: standard
- GCCF: standard

The Exotic Shorthair is a breed of cat developed as a short-haired version of the Persian. The Exotic is similar to the Persian in appearance with the exception of the short dense coat.

== History ==
In the late 1950s, the Persian was used as an outcross by some American Shorthair breeders. This was done in secret in order to improve their body type, and crosses were also made with the Russian Blue and the Burmese. The crossbreed look gained recognition in the show ring, but unhappy American Shorthair breeders successfully produced a new breed standard that would disqualify American Shorthairs that showed signs of crossbreeding. One American Shorthair breeder who saw the potential of the Persian/American Shorthair cross proposed and eventually got the Cat Fanciers' Association judge and American Shorthair breeder Jane Martinke to recognize them as a new breed in 1966, under the name Exotic Shorthair. In 1987, the Cat Fanciers' Association closed the Exotic to shorthair outcrosses, leaving Persian as the only allowable outcross breed.

== Description ==
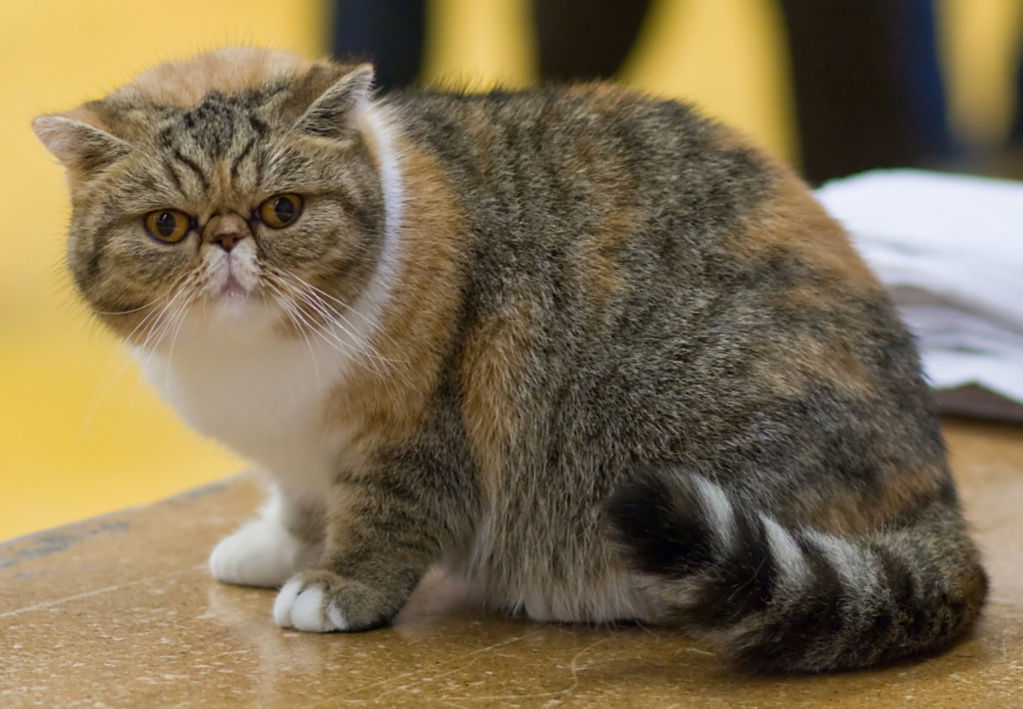
An Exotic Shorthair cat.

=== Appearance ===
The Exotic Shorthair is a medium to large-sized breed, closely resembling the Persian in overall build. It has a large, round head with prominent full cheeks and large round eyes that contribute to its distinctive expression. The ears are small, rounded at the tips, and set low on the head, enhancing the breed's broad, rounded appearance. The tail is relatively short in proportion to the body, maintaining the breed's compact and balanced silhouette. Just like the British Shorthair and the Persian the Exotic Shorthair comes in all different colour variations.

== Longhair Exotics ==
Because of the regular use of Persian as outcrosses, some Exotics may carry a copy of the recessive longhair gene. When two such cats mate, there is a 1 in 4 chance of each offspring being longhaired. Longhaired Exotics are not considered Persians by the Cat Fanciers' Association, although The International Cat Association accepts them as Persians. Other associations like the American Cat Fanciers Association register them as a separate Exotic Longhair breed.

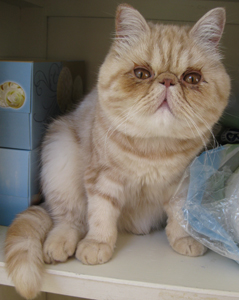
Male Exotic Shorthair – 12 months

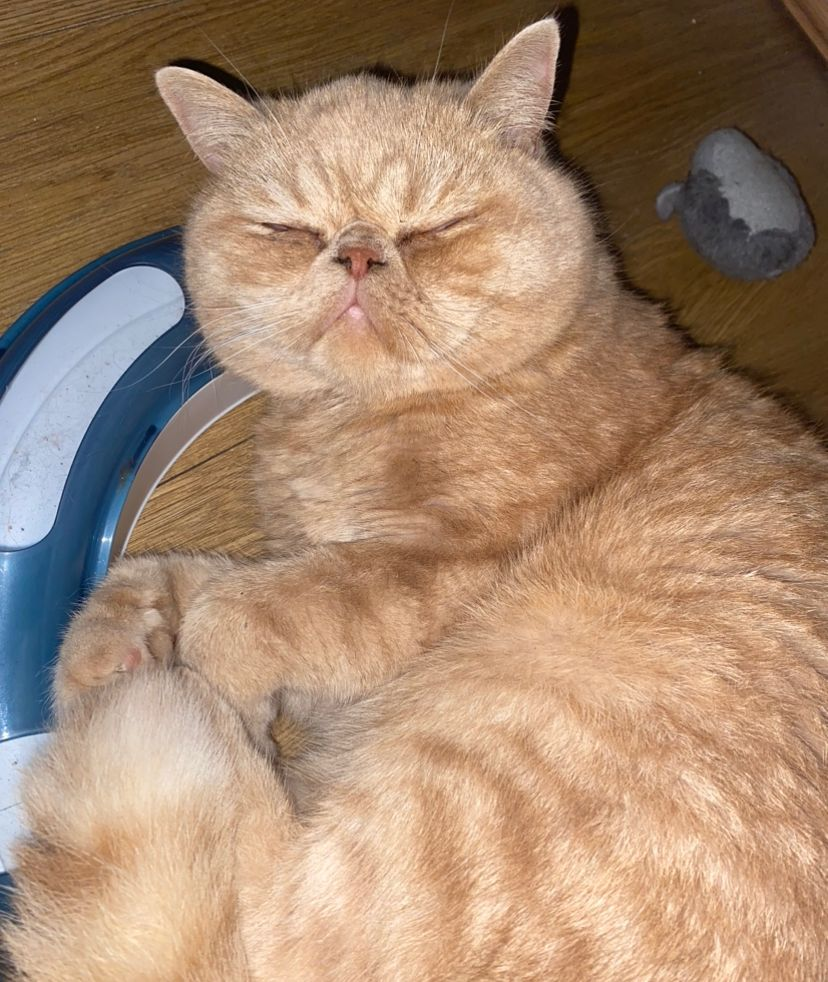
A sleeping Exotic Shorthair

== Health ==
Like the Persian the Exotic Shorthair is a brachycephalic breed, meaning that it has problems as a result of having the nose and eyes in close proximity to each other, giving the appearance of a pushed-in face. Some conditions common in the Exotic Shorthair are listed below.

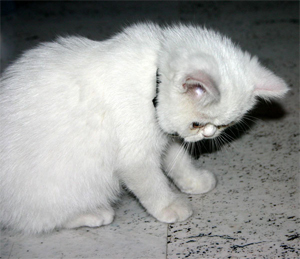
12-week-old white female Exotic Shorthair

- Brachycephalic airway obstructive syndrome. Also referred to as brachycephalic respiratory syndrome or congenital obstructive upper airway disease, this causes upper airway abnormalities ranging in severity. The syndrome can cause increased airway resistance, inflammation of structures in the airways, and increased strain on the heart. Treatment includes weight loss, surgery, and avoiding humid or hot conditions.
- Corneal sequestrum. A necrosis of the cornea of unknown origin.
- Dystocia. An abnormal labor due to large-domed skulls.
- Feline polycystic kidney disease (PKD). Exotic Shorthairs, as well as Persians and other Persian-derived cats, have a high chance of inheriting PKD, a disease that can lead to kidney failure. Several studies using ultrasound scan screening have shown that the prevalence of PKD in Exotics is between 40 and 50% in developed nations. DNA screening for PKD is recommended for all Exotic cats used in breeding programs to reduce the incidence of kidney disease by spaying and neutering PKD positive cats.

In a review of over 5,000 cases of urate urolithiasis the Exotic Shorthair was significantly under-represented, with only one of the recorded cases belonging to an Exotic Shorthair.

== Recognition ==
The Exotic has steadily gained popularity among cat fanciers with the help of the devoted advocates of the breed who saw the value in a Persian and Shorthair crossbreed.

- In 1967, the Exotic Shorthair was first accepted for Championship status by the Cat Fanciers' Association.
- In 1971, the first Exotic Shorthair achieved the status of Grand Champion.
- In 1986, the Fédération Internationale Féline recognized the Exotic Shorthair.
- In 1991, an Exotic was the Cat Fanciers' Association's Cat of the Year.
- In 2012, the Cat Fanciers' Association's Best Cat was an Exotic.
