= Somali cat =

Breed of cat

Somali
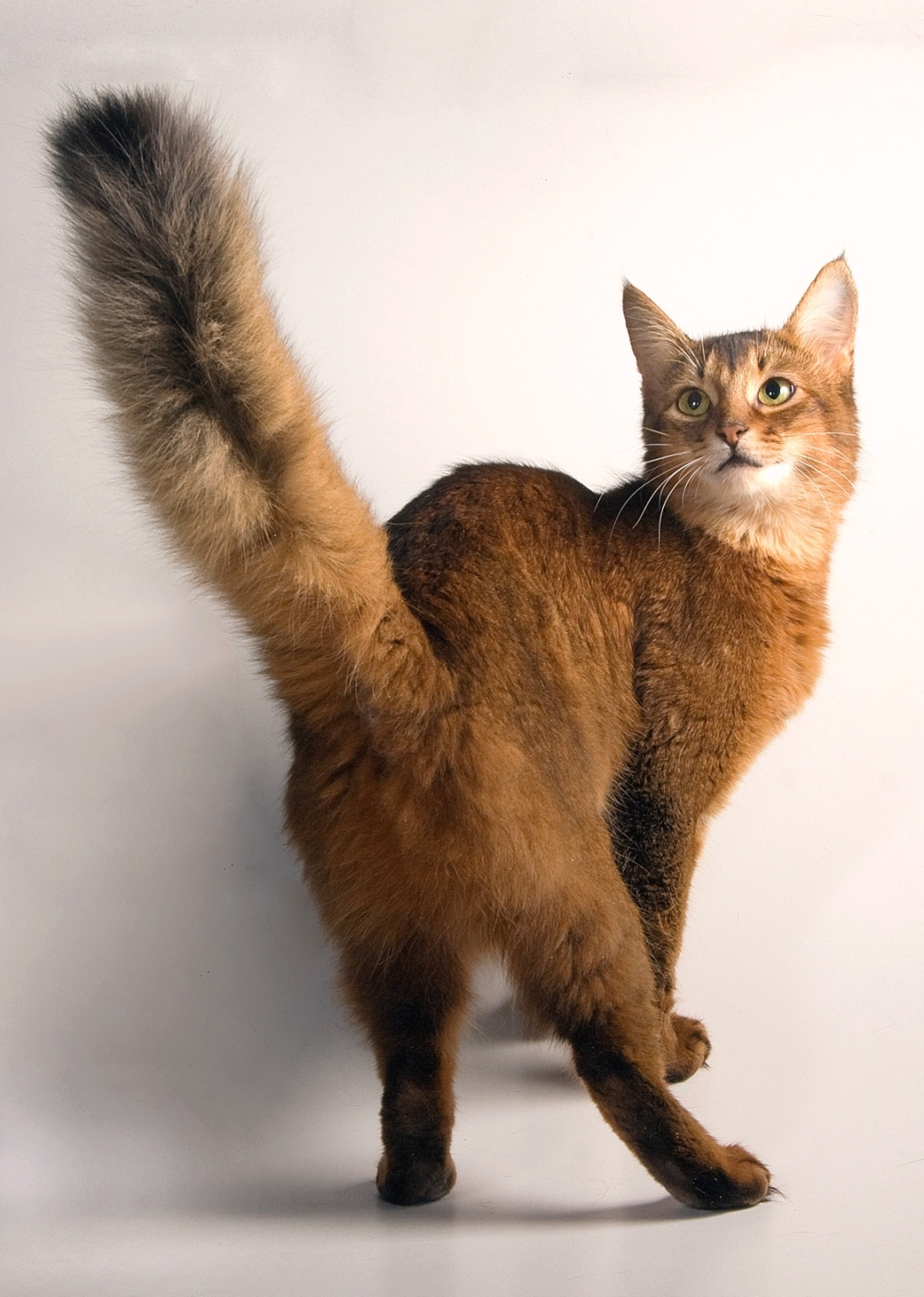
- A ruddy Somali Cat
- Common nicknames: Fox cat; long-haired Abyssinian
- Origin: North America
- Foundation bloodstock: Abyssinian cats

Breed standards
- CFA: standard
- FIFe: standard
- TICA: standard
- ACF: standard
- ACFA/CAA: standard
- CCA-AFC: standard
- GCCF: standard

The Somali cat is a pedigree breed of domestic cat descended from the Abyssinian cat. Due to inheriting two copies of the recessive gene for long hair, they have a characteristic luscious coat. The Somali cat is often described as a long-haired Abyssinian and the first Somali cats appeared in the litters of Abyssinians as long-haired kittens, though how the gene was introduced into the Abyssinian gene pool is still a mystery.

== History ==
In the 1940s, a British breeder named Janet Robertson exported some Abyssinian kittens to Australia, New Zealand and North America. Descendants of these cats occasionally produced kittens with long or fuzzy coats. In 1963, Mary Mailing, a breeder from Canada, entered one into a local pet show. Ken McGill, the show's judge, asked for one for breeding purposes.

The first known long-haired Abyssinian, named 'Raby Chuffa of Selene', appeared in North America in 1953. Breeders assume that the long-haired gene was passed down through his ancestry. Most breeders were appalled by the sudden difference in appearance in their litters and refused to mention them. However, some breeders were intrigued and continued to breed the long-haired Abyssinian. At first, other Abyssinian breeders looked down upon the new development of the Somali and refused to associate them with the Abyssinian. They worked hard to keep the long-haired gene out of their own cats.

An Abyssinian breeder from the US, Evelyn Mague, also received longhairs from her cats, which she named "Somalis". Mague put out a call for other cats to breed with her own long-haired Abyssinians and found the many other breeders internationally that had been breeding long-haired Abyssinians for several years already. Don Richings, another Canadian breeder, used kittens from McGill, and began to work with Mague. The first Somali recognised as such by a fancier organisation was Mayling Tutsuta, one of McGill's cats.

The name "Somali" is in reference to the African nation, Somalia. Somalia borders Abyssinia, which is modern day Ethiopia. The name of the breed is a unique interpretation of the Ethiopian-Somali conflict; Mague charitably assumed that since the land borders were a human creation, so are the genetic borders between the Abyssinian cat and the long-haired Abyssinian.

== Breed registration ==
In 1975, the CFA founded the International Somali Cat Club. Mague also founded the Somali Cat Club of America, which included members from Canada as well. The SCCA worked to grant the breed championship status by the CFA, which occurred in 1979. The new breed was accepted in Europe in 1982. By 1991, the breed was broadly (though not universally) accepted internationally.

Within the GCCF, short haired Somalis are recognised separately from Abyssinian cats.

=== Popularity ===
Somalis are a relatively rare breed worldwide. In the 2024 statistics of FIFe, one of the major global cat registries, the breed ranked at position 25 out of 54 breeds in popularity, comprising 0,2% of their total registered kittens that year, which translates to 230 cats.

== Characteristics ==
=== Appearance ===
Somalis are recognised for their energetic and social nature. Their appearance with sleek bodies, long tails, and large pointed ears have earned them the nickname of "Fox Cat". Their ticked coats contain between four and twenty colours on each hair are very fine in texture making their coats softer to the touch than those of other cat breeds. The cat itself is medium-large in size.

==== Colours and patterns ====
All Somali cats have a ticked tabby pattern. The usual or ruddy coloured Somali has a golden brown ground colour ticked with black, so the official genetic term is black ticked tabby. The coat colour names in Somalis refer to the ticking colour. There are 28 colours of Somali in total although certain organisations accept only some of these colours. All organisations that register Somalis permit:

- black, (a.k.a. 'usual', 'ruddy', 'tawny')
- blue
- cinnamon (a.k.a. 'sorrel', 'red')
- fawn

Most clubs also recognise these four colours in combination with silver. Other colours that may be accepted by some registries include chocolate, lilac, red, and cream, and in combination with tortoiseshell and silver (e.g. lilac-tortie silver).

== Health ==
The Somali is one of the more commonly affected breeds for pyruvate kinase deficiency. An autosomal recessive mutation of the PKLR gene is responsible for the condition in the breed.

Somalis may also have hereditary retinal degeneration due to a mutation in the rdAc allele. This mutation is also seen in Abyssinians, Siamese cats, and other related breeds.

== Coat colour overview ==
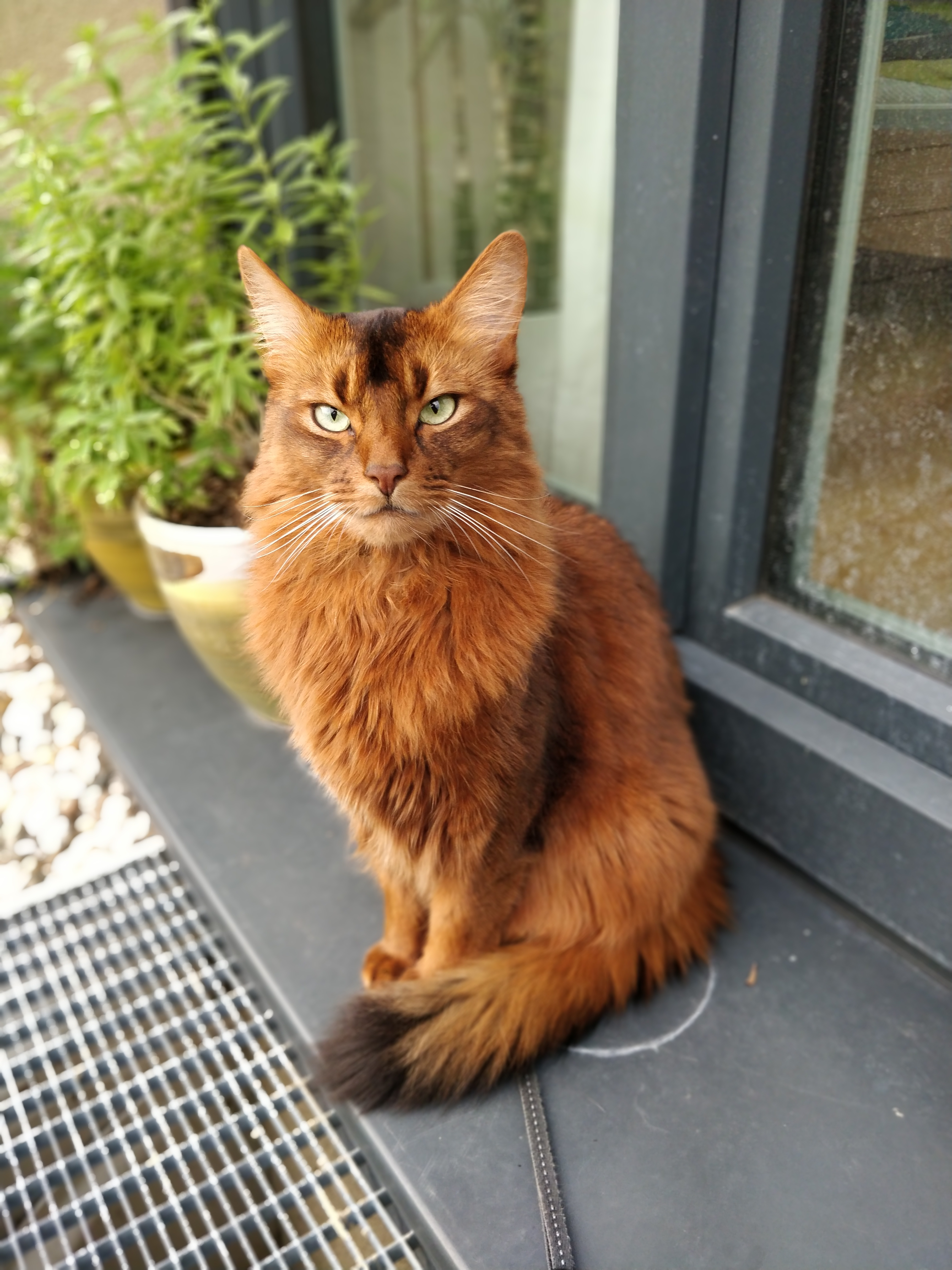
Ruddy

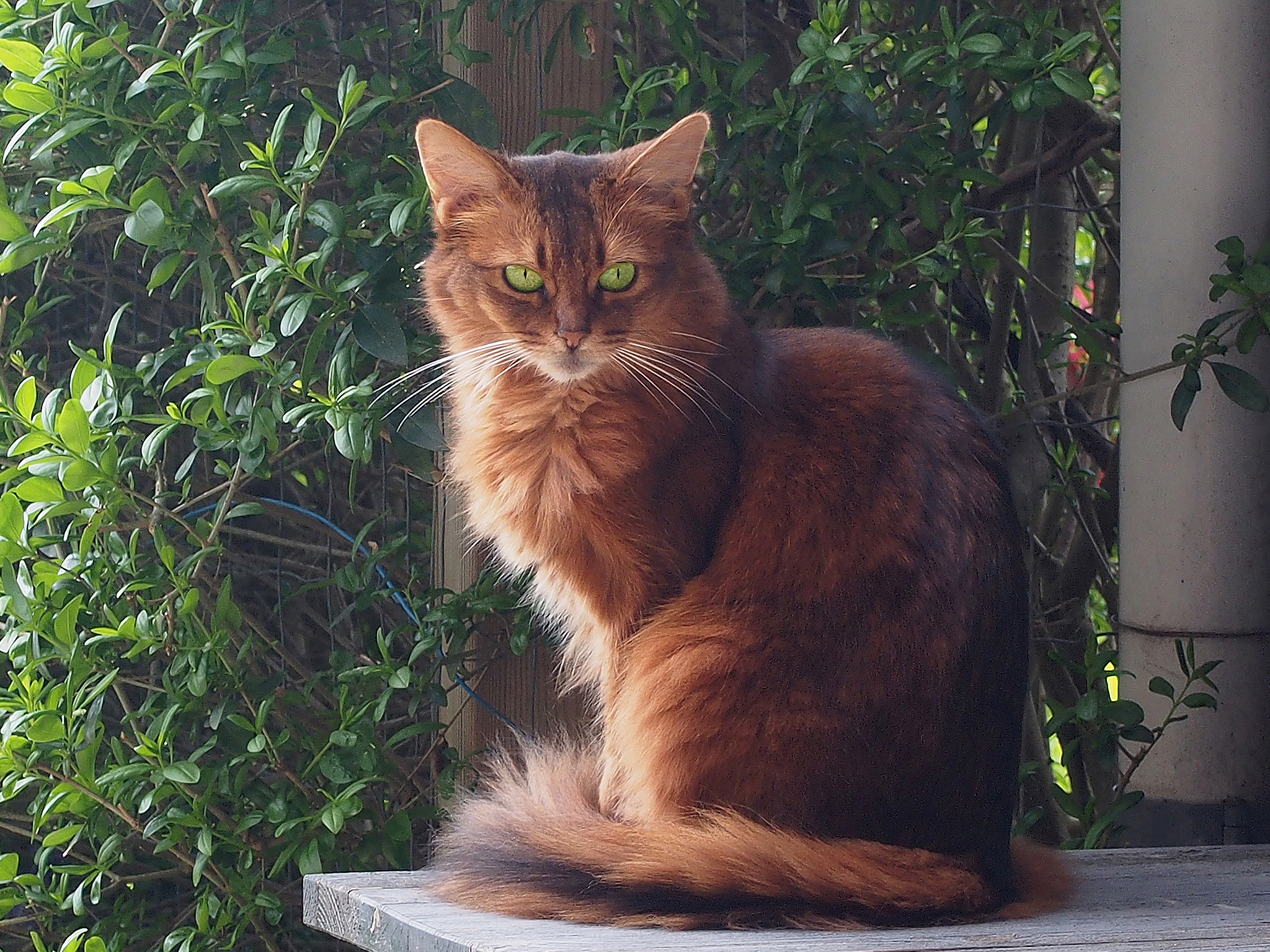
Ruddy female

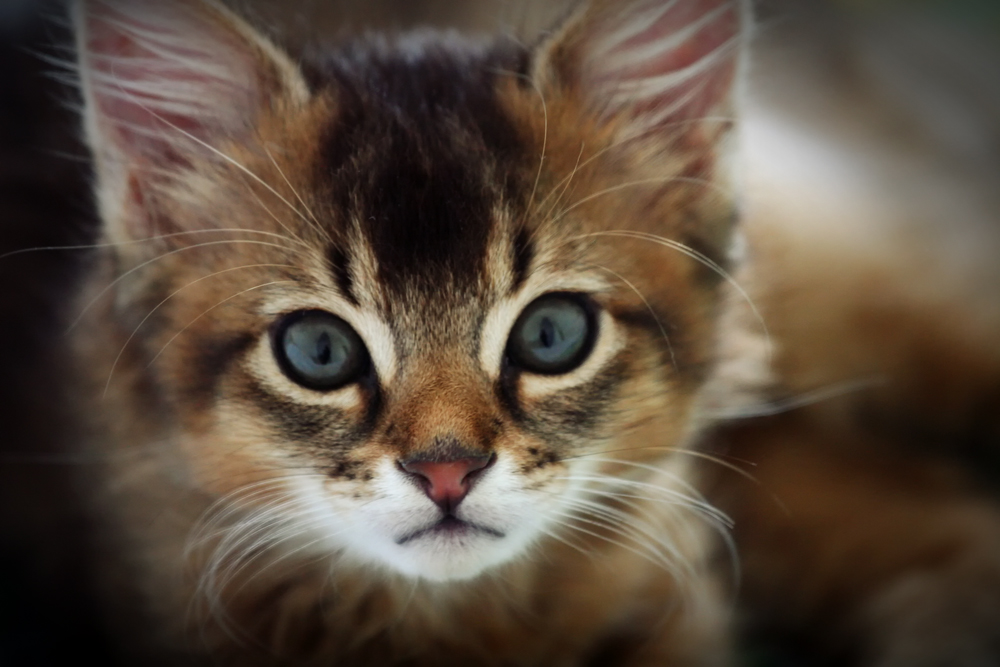
Ruddy (usual) kitten

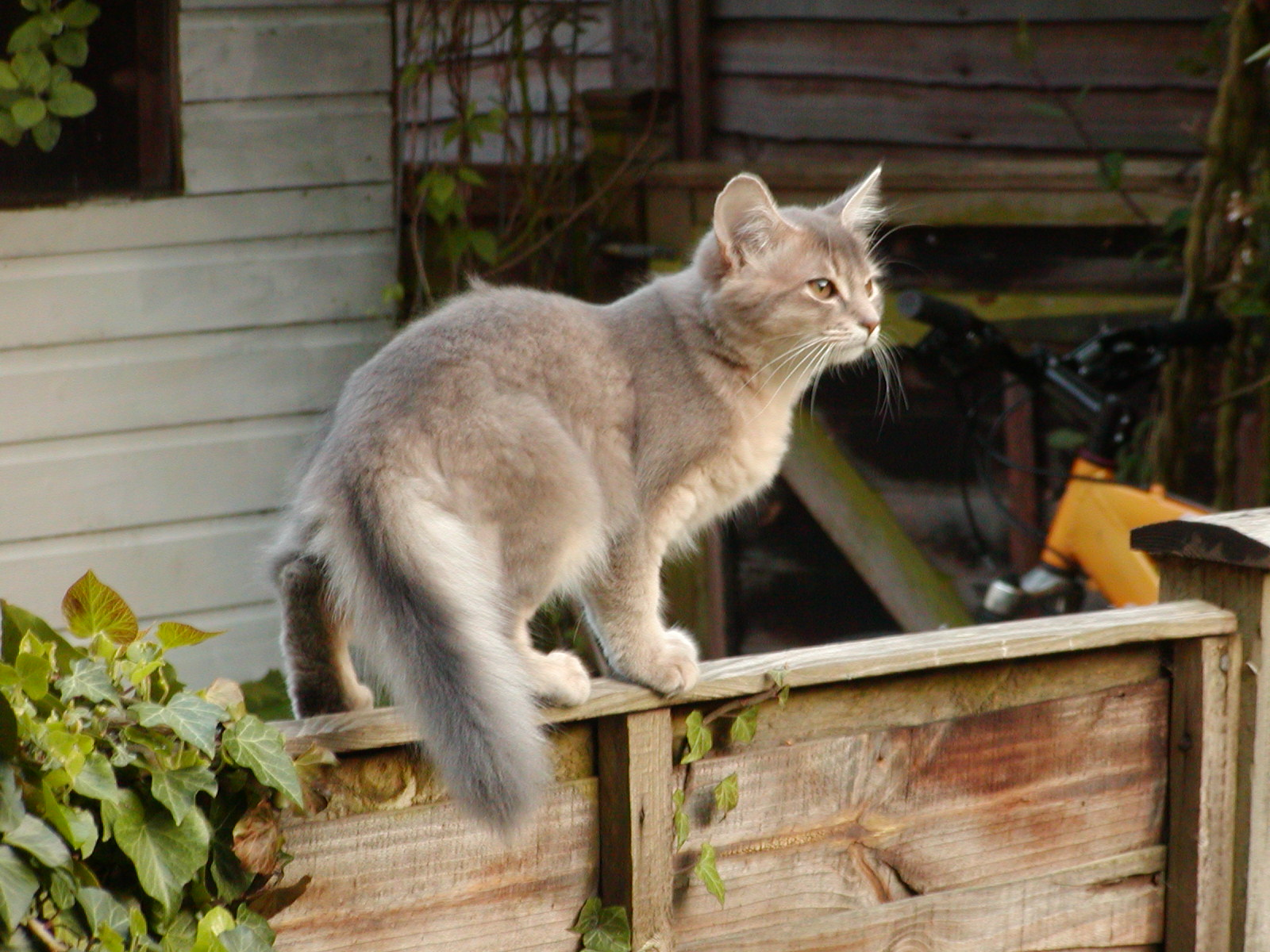
Blue kitten

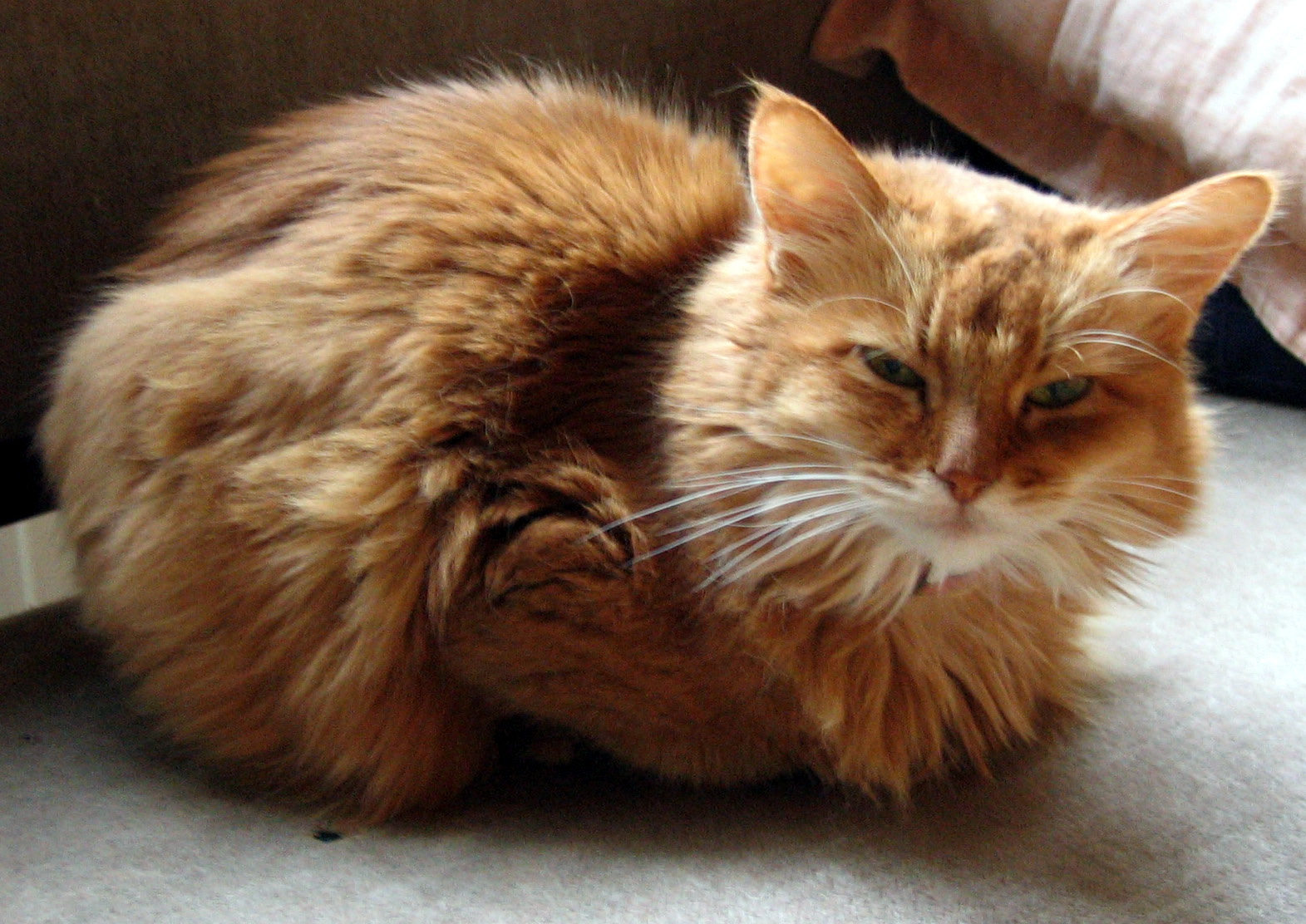
Sorrel

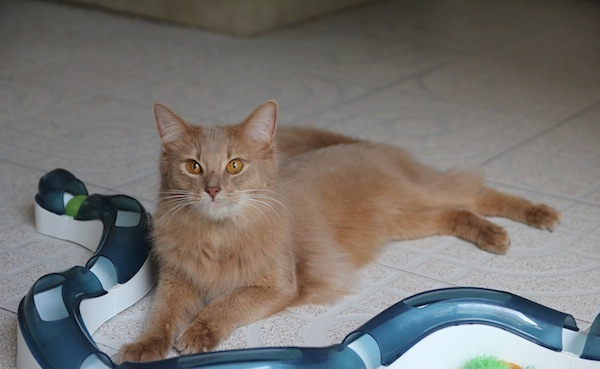
Fawn

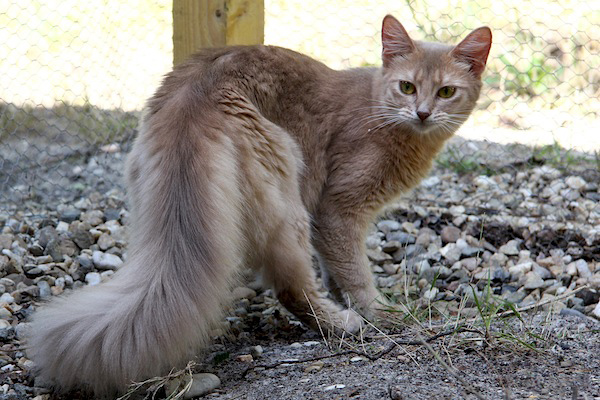
Lilac

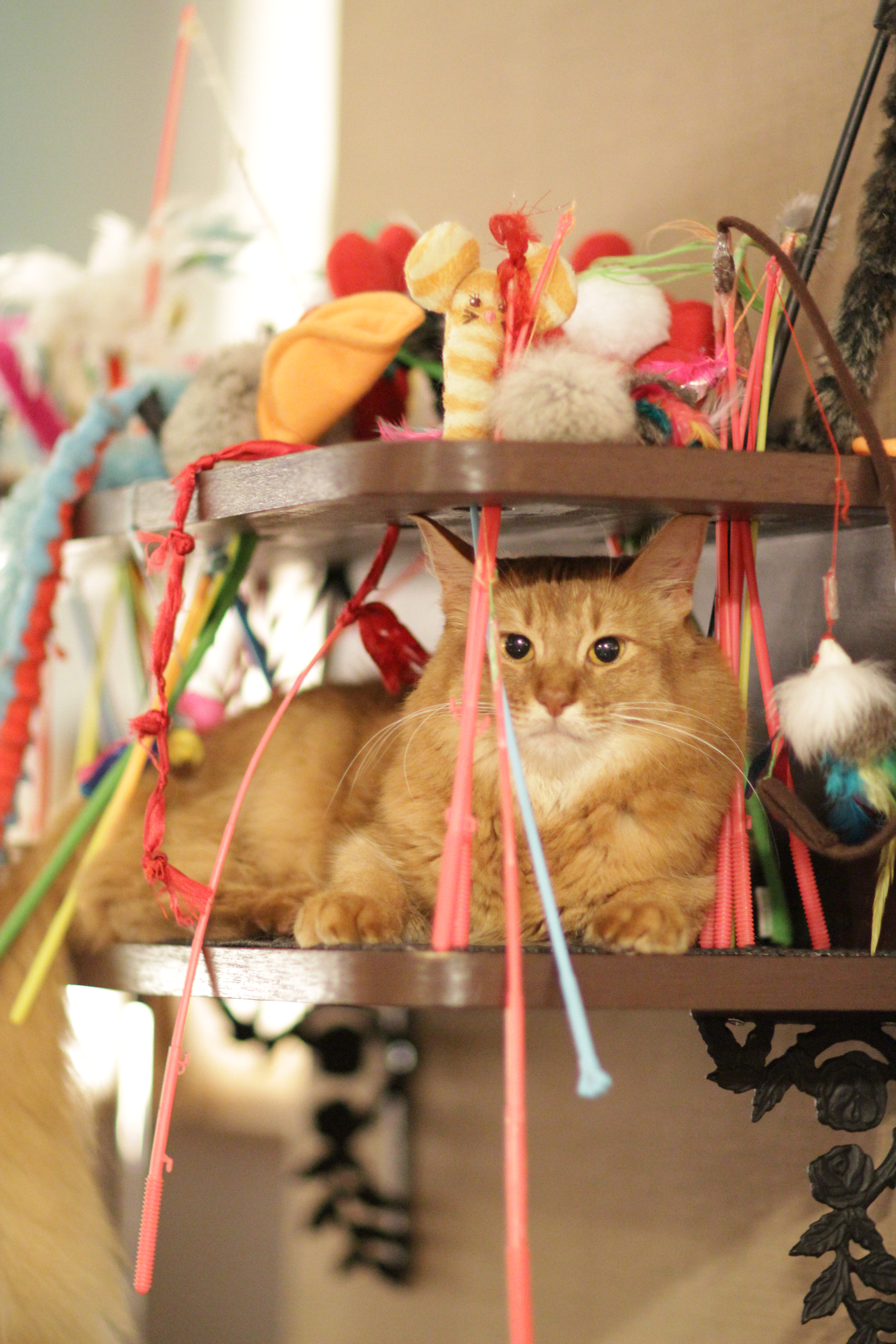
Female in a cat café
