= Ocicat =

Breed of domestic cat

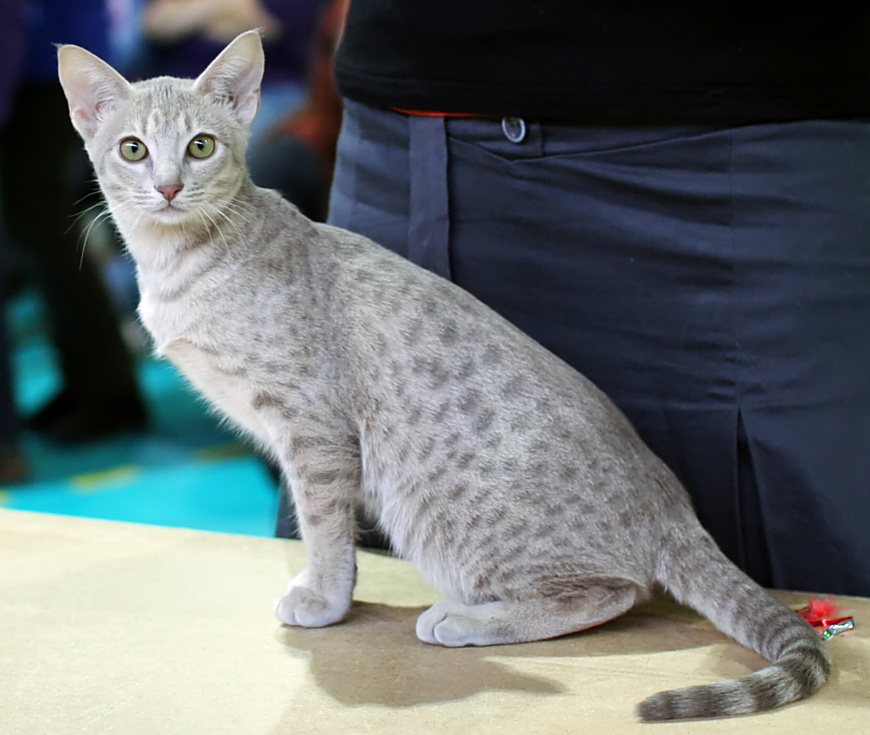
- Lilac spotted tabby Ocicat
- Origin: United States
- Foundation bloodstock: Siamese, Abyssinian, American Shorthair

Breed standards
- CFA: standard
- FIFe: standard
- TICA: standard
- ACFA/CAA: standard
- CCA-AFC: standard
- GCCF: standard

Notes
- Slightly larger than regular domestic cats.

The Ocicat is an all-domestic breed of domestic cat which resembles a wild cat but has no (recent) wild DNA in its gene pool. It has a spotted tabby coat, and is named for its resemblance to the ocelot. The breed was established by crossbreeding the Siamese and Abyssinian, and later on American Shorthair would be added.

== History ==
=== Origin ===
The Ocicat was created spontaneously by Virginia Daly (Dalai) of Berkley, Michigan, US, who in 1964 attempted to breed a cat with the mixed features of the typical reddish-brown ticked tabby agouti pattern of a black Abyssinian and the oriental-built with colourpoint pattern of the Siamese. Daly bred a black ('ruddy') ticked tabby Abyssinian male, carrying cinnamon, named Dalai Deta Tim of Selene to a female black ('seal') point Siamese named Dalai Tomboy Patter. The first generation of kittens appeared Abyssinian-like, and a female named Dalai She was kept. Dalai She was later bred to a chocolate point Siamese tom named Whitehead Elegante Sun. The resulting litter had the desired mixed Abyssinian-Siamese-style kittens. She continued breeding them but this time one of the kittens had cinnamon-coloured spots on an ivory background. Virginia's daughter said he looked like an ocelot and wished to name him 'ocicat', instead he was named Tonga and was sold off to a medical student for US$10 with an agreement to neuter him. Daly corresponded with geneticist Dr. Clyde Keeler of Georgia University, who attempted to create a spotted cat similar to extinct Egyptian ones. As Tonga looked similar to the cat, Keeler suggested that Daly breed Tonga back with his mother. Given that Tonga was neutered, she bred his parents together again and this produced a black ('tawny') spotted male named Dalai Dotson. Daly refocused her breeding programme towards the recreation of this spotted tabby wild-appearing cat. A further step involved incorporating the American Shorthair to enhance body structure, bone density, and to introduce the breed’s silver colouring gene.

The Ocicat would first be brought to the United Kingdom in 1988 when two cats: Catoninetail Mr Smith and Catoninetail Miss Jones were imported from the United States. Four more would be imported a year later. A total of 33 Ocicats would be imported before 2015. Other breeders joined in and used the same recipe; Siamese to Abyssinian, and offspring to Siamese.

== Breed recognition ==
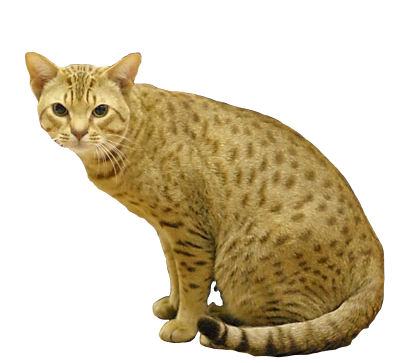
Chocolate spotted tabby

In 1966 the breed was recognised with the Cat Fanciers' Association (CFA) for registration only. It was more than 20 years later in May 1987 that the Ocicat achieved championship status with the CFA. The International Cat Association (TICA) recognised the Ocicat in 1986. The breed is recognised by Fédération Internationale Féline (FIFe) since 1992. The Governing Council of the Cat Fancy gave preliminary recognition in June 1997. In June 2002 it promoted the Ocicat to provisional status. Championship status followed in 2006.

=== Aztec ===
In 2013 the GCCF recognised the Aztec as a separate breed. The Aztec is a mackerel tabby coated version of the Ocicat that would often occur in litters but not meet the standard of the Ocicat as it called for spotted cats only. Aside from the coat it is otherwise identical to the Ocicat. As of 2024 the Aztec has been merged back with the Ocicat and is now the Ocicat Classic, a variant of the Ocicat.

== Characteristics ==
=== Appearance ===
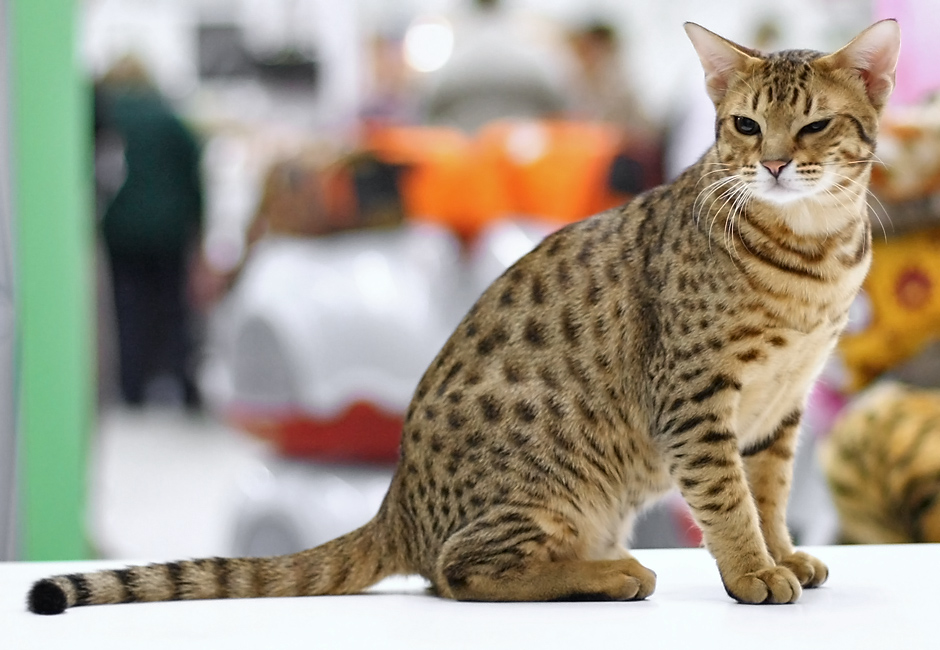
Black spotted tabby

The Ocicat is a medium to large cat with agouti tabby markings. It has the appearance of an athletic animal: well-muscled and lithe. The muzzle is broad and well defined with gentle curvature of the head. Ears are set around a 45-degree angle. The eyes are large and almond shaped with good spacing so there is more than an eye-width gap between the two. All eye colours are accepted, bar blue. Legs are of medium to long length and well-muscled with a good proportion to the body. The tail is long, slim with a slight taper and has a dark tip. Adult Ocicats weigh between 2.5–6.5 kg (6–14 lb).

==== Coat ====
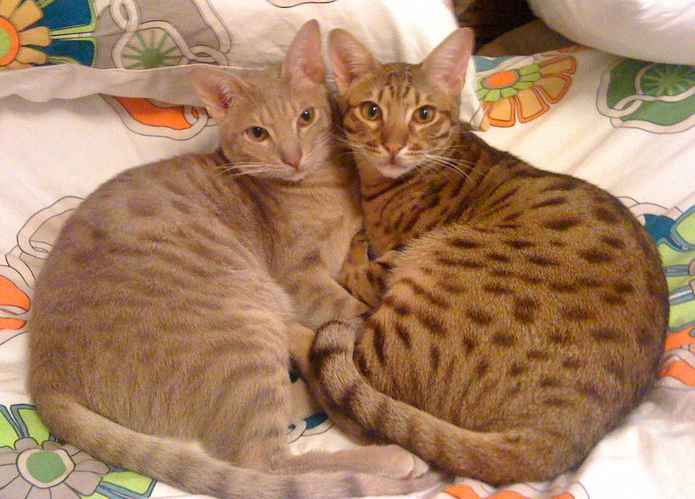
Lilac and chocolate spotted tabbies

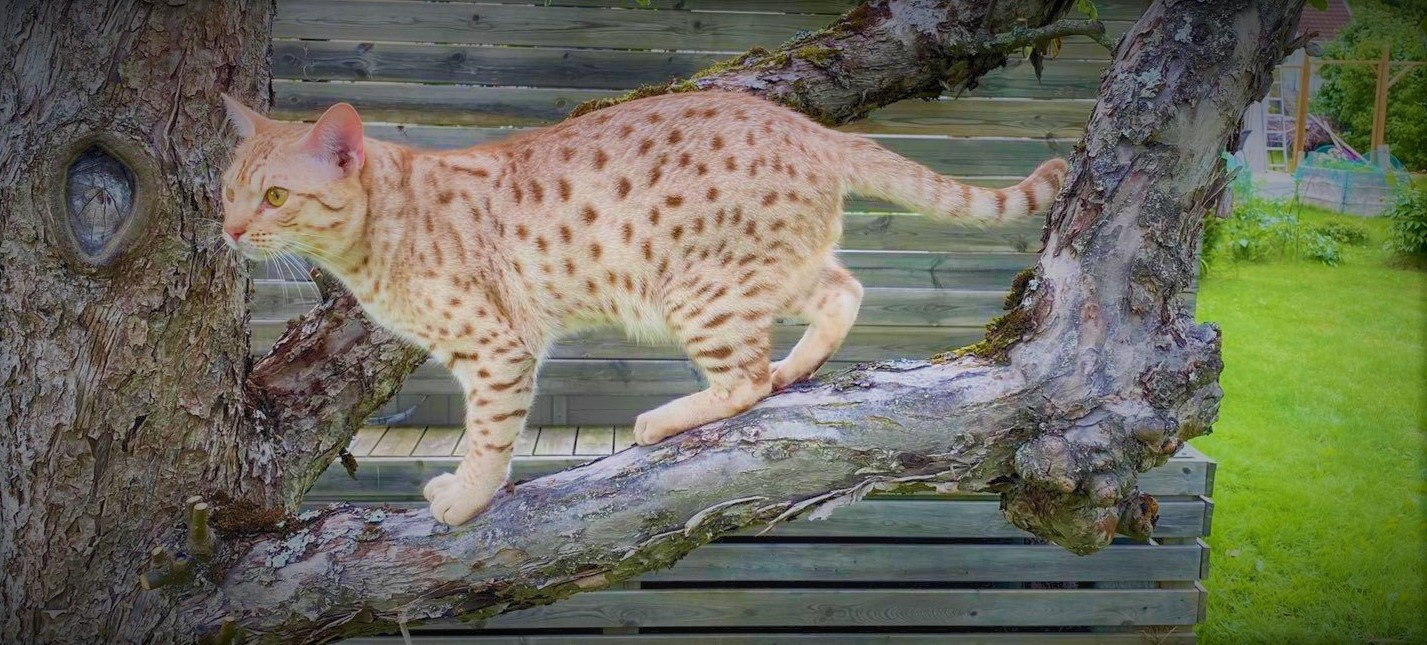
Cinnamon silver spotted tabby in tree

The colour should be darkest at the tip of the tail with the rest of the markings being lighter than the tip.

Only the spotted tabby markings are permissible. There is a recognisable tabby 'M' pattern on the forehead. The markings extend all the way to the back of the neck from the forehead. Markings that resemble mascara are found around the eyes and cheeks. There are spots all throughout the body.

All eumelanistic colours and their silver variety are allowed in the breed resulting in 12 recognised spotted tabby colours for the Ocicat:

- black ('tawny', 'ebony') and black silver
- blue and blue silver
- chocolate and chocolate silver
- lilac ('lavender') and lilac silver
- cinnamon and cinnamon silver
- fawn and fawn silver

=== Behaviour ===
Their temperament is often described as that of a "dog in a cat's body". Most can be trained to fetch, walk on a leash and harness, come when called, speak, sit, lie down on command and other canine-style tricks.

== Health ==
In a review of over 5,000 cases of urate urolithiasis in the US, the Ocicat had a much higher incidence rate than most other breeds with an odds ratio of 16.8. A Swedish study of pyometra in cats based on veterinary and insurance data found the Ocicat to have the third highest incidence of the condition with it being six times the rate for all cats.
