= American Shorthair =

Breed of cat

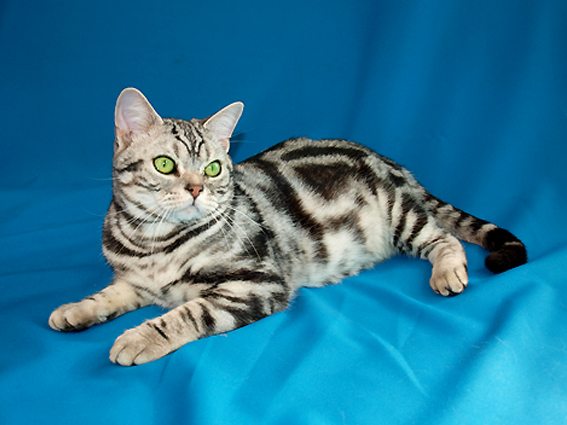
- Black–silver blotched tabby American Shorthair
- Origin: North America
- Foundation bloodstock: European landrace

Breed standards
- CFA: standard
- TICA: standard
- CCA-AFC: standard

The American Shorthair (ASH) is a breed of domestic cat believed to be descended from European cats brought to North America by early settlers to protect valuable cargo from mice and rats. According to the Cat Fanciers' Association (CFA), it was the eighth-most-popular pedigreed cat in the world for 2020.

== History ==
When settlers sailed from Europe to North America, they carried cats on board (ship's cats) to protect the stores from mice—for instance, the cats that came over on the Mayflower with the Pilgrims to hunt rats on the ship and in the colony. Many of these cats landed in the New World, interbred, and developed special characteristics to help them cope with their new life and climate. Early in the 20th century, a selective breeding program was established to develop the best qualities of these cats.

The American Shorthair is a pedigree cat breed, with a strict conformation standard, as set by cat fanciers of the breed and North American cat fancier associations such as The International Cat Association (TICA) and the CFA. The breed is accepted by all North American cat registries. Originally known as the Domestic Shorthair, in 1966 the breed was renamed the American Shorthair to better represent its "all-American" origins and to differentiate it from other short-haired breeds. The name American Shorthair also reinforces the breed's pedigreed status as distinct from the random-bred non-pedigreed domestic short-haired cats in North America, which may nevertheless resemble the American Shorthair. Both the American Shorthair breed and the random-bred cats from which the breed is derived are sometimes called working cats because they were used for controlling rodent populations, on ships and farms. The American Shorthair (then referred to as the Domestic Shorthair) was among the first five breeds that were registered by the CFA in 1906.

== Description ==
=== Appearance ===
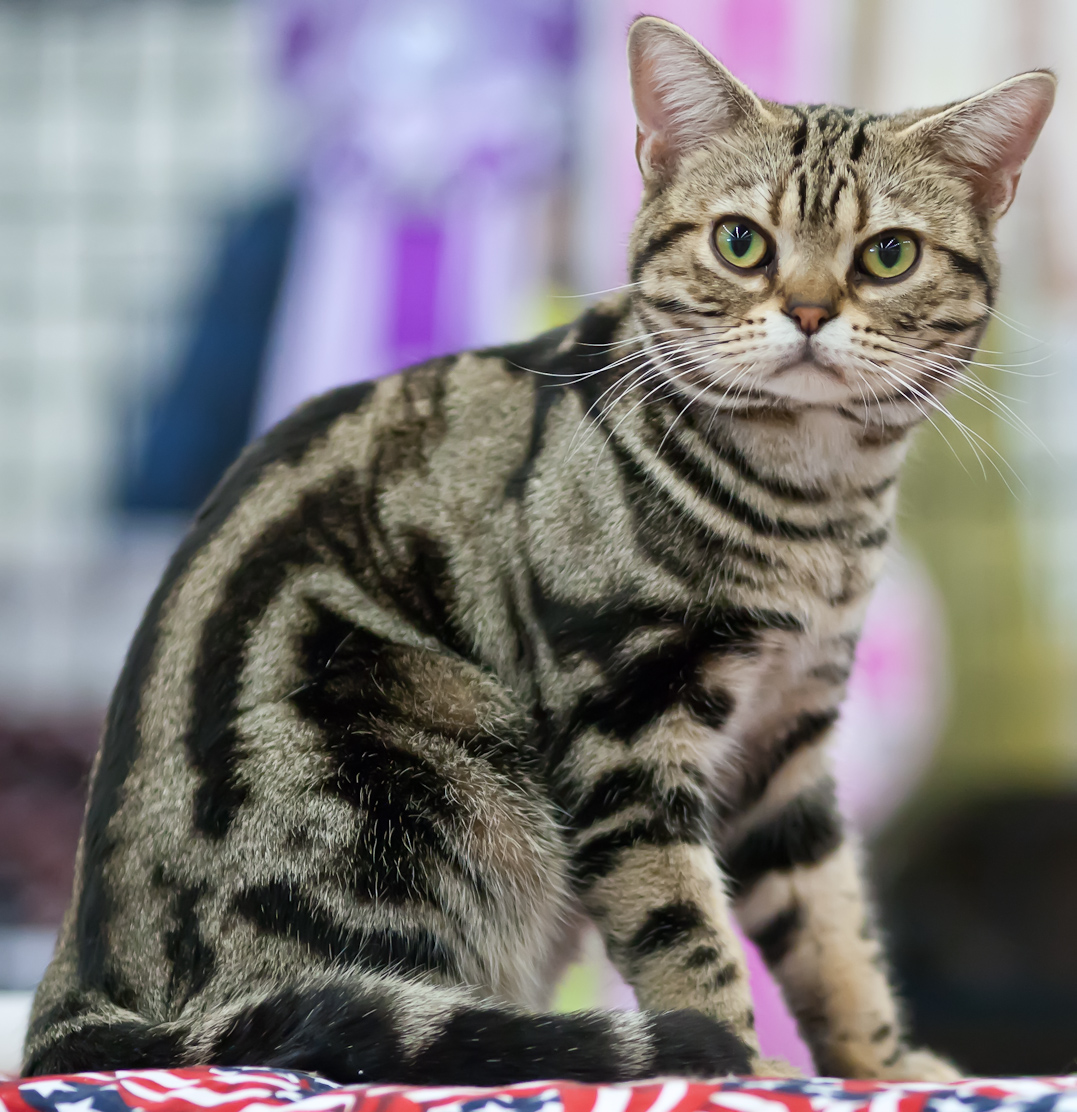
Brown blotched tabby adult

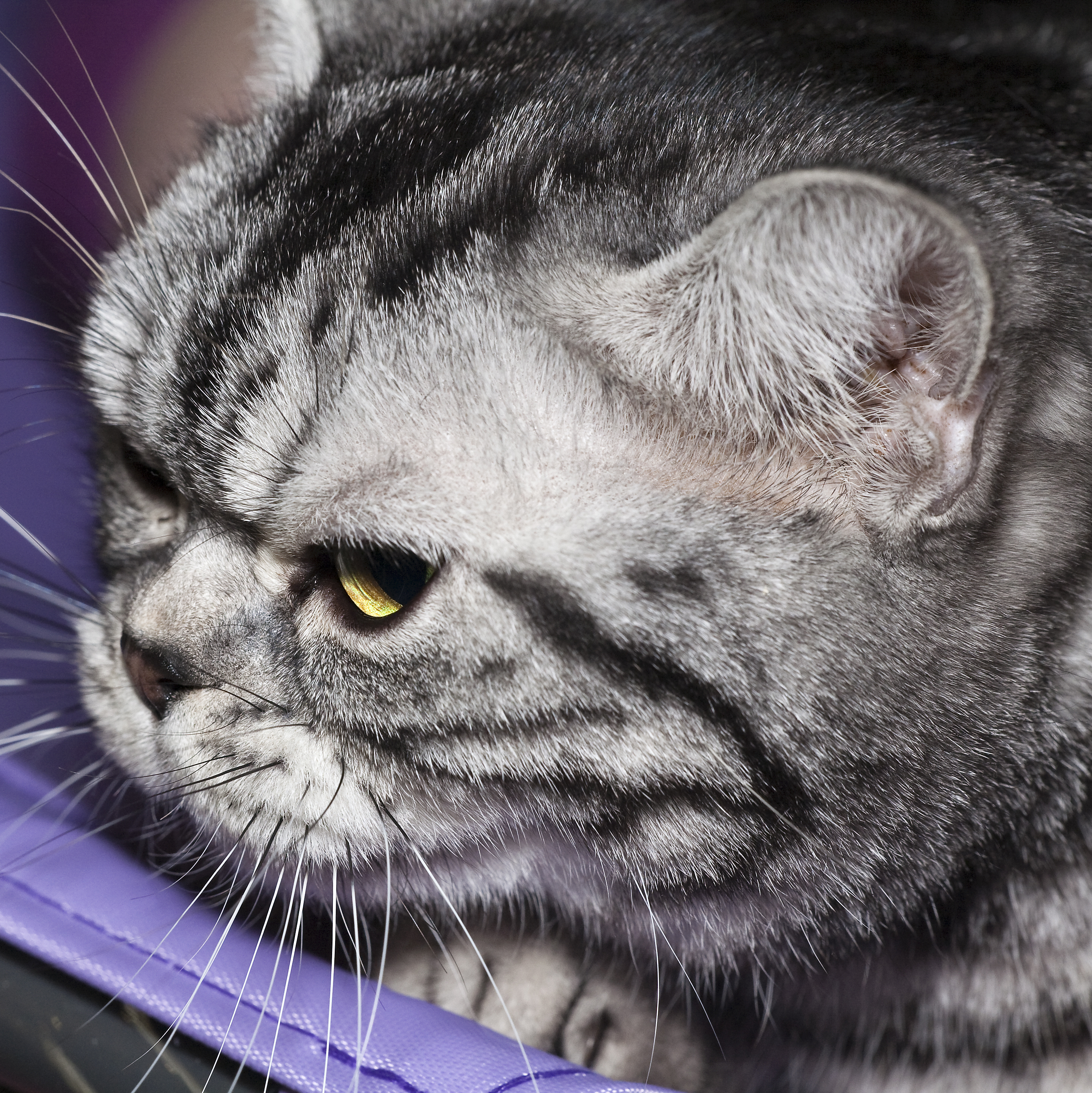
Side profile of an adult head showing the typical short nose

The American Shorthair is a medium- to large-sized cat breed, with males weighing 5–7 kg (11–15 lb) and females weighing 2.5–5.5 kg (6–12 lb). The head is large and oblong, with more length than width. The ears are medium-sized and slightly rounded at the tips. The eyes are large and wide. Its neck is medium in length and well muscled. The legs are medium in length and muscular. The tail is of medium length and well proportioned to the body.

==== Coat color ====
The American Shorthair is recognized in more than eighty different colors and patterns, ranging from the brown-patched tabby to the blue-eyed white, the silvers (tabbies, shaded, smokes, and cameos) to the Van-patterned calico, and many colors in between. Some even come in deep tones of black, brown, or other blends and combinations. Generally, only cats showing evidence of crossbreeding resulting in the colors chocolate, sable, lilac (lavender), or the point-restricted pattern of the Siamese family are disqualified from being shown in cat shows.

== Health ==
A study conducted in Japan of cats suspected to have kidney problems found that 47% of tested American Shorthair cats had the PKD1 mutation, which is responsible for feline polycystic kidney disease (PKD). A review of over 5,000 cases of urate urolithiasis in the United States found that the American Shorthair had significantly lower odds of developing urate uroliths than mixed-breed cats.

== Gallery ==
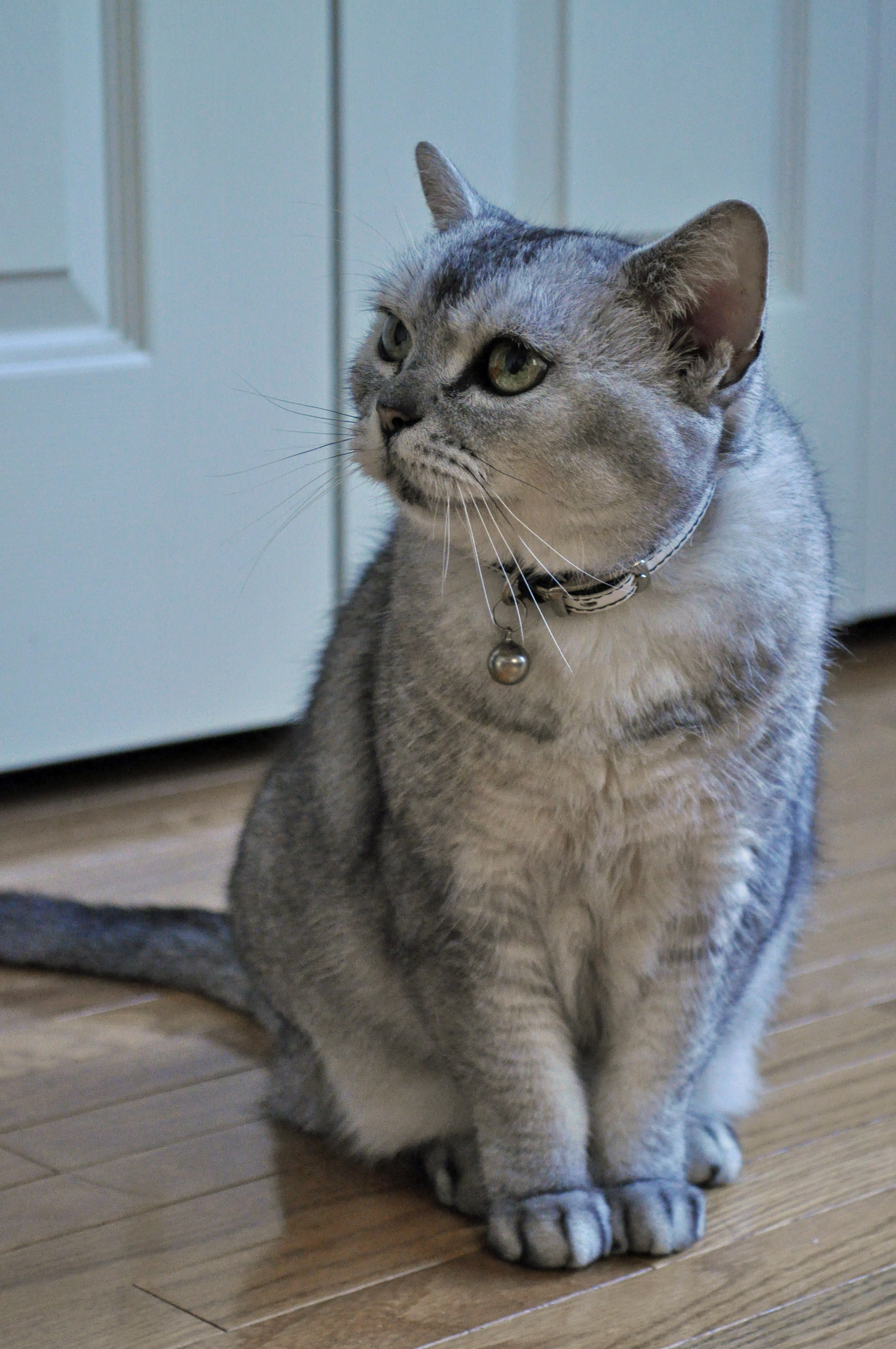
Black–silver shaded female adult

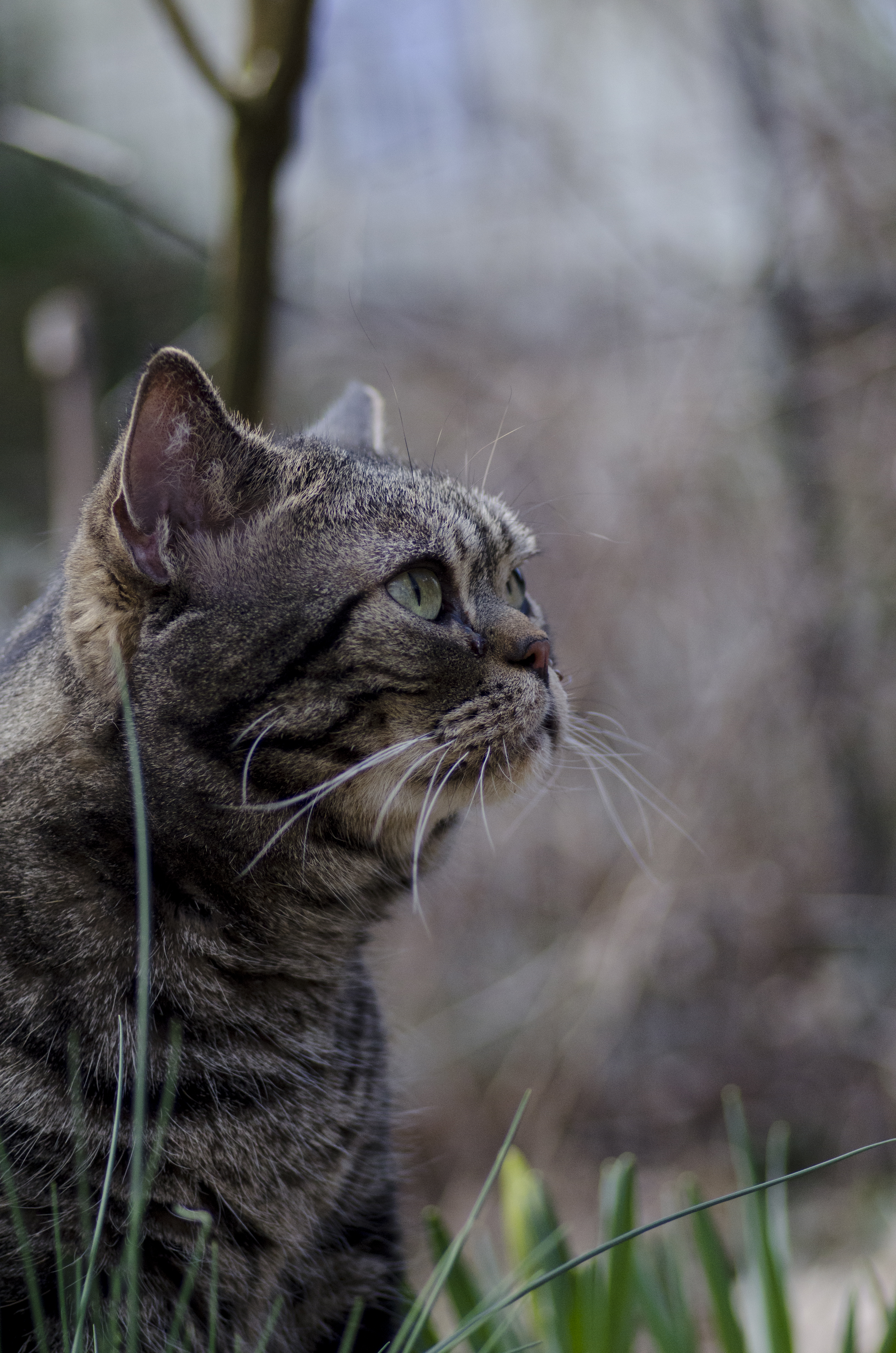
Side profile of a black tabby adult

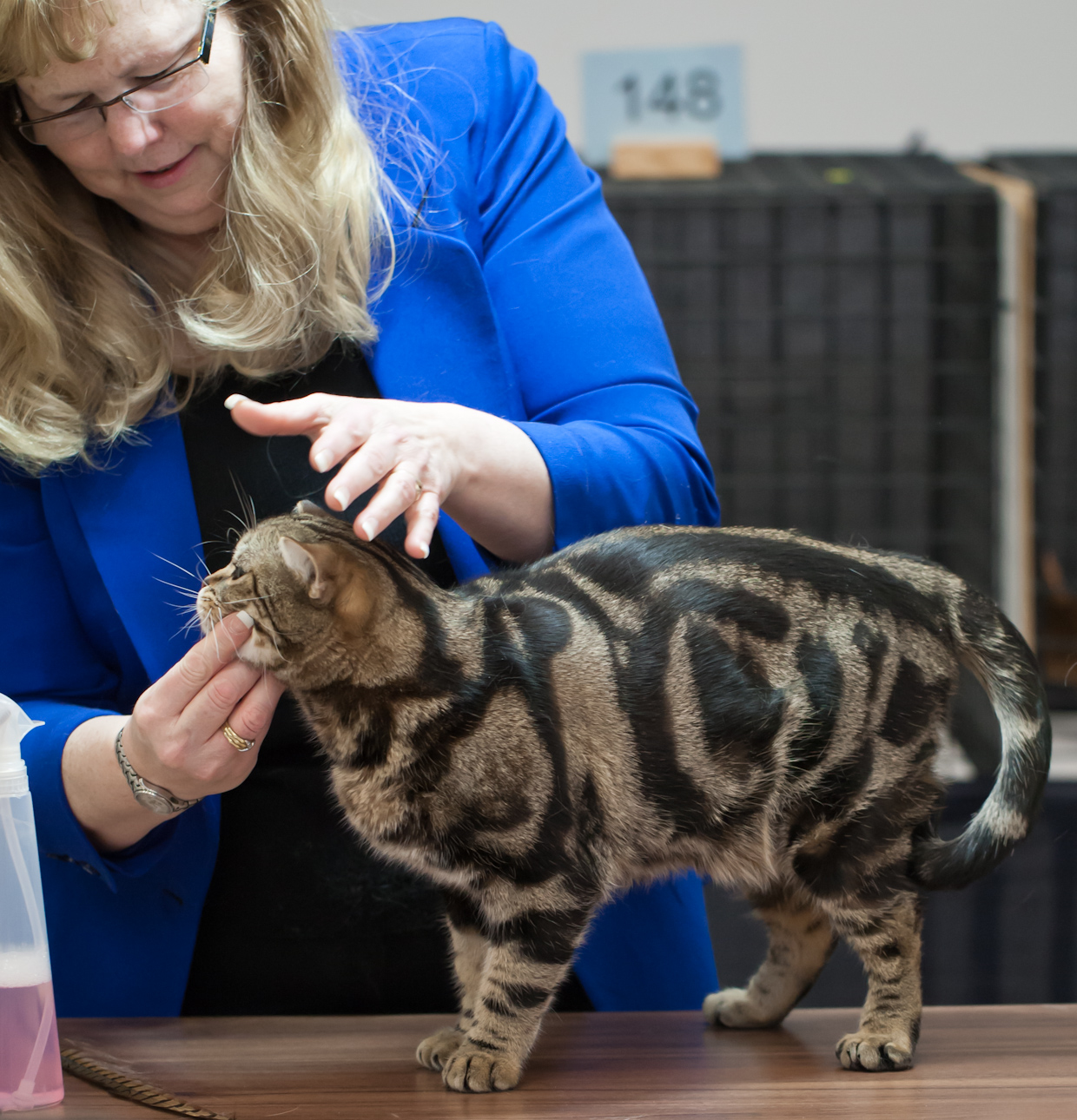
Black blotched tabby adult on a cat show

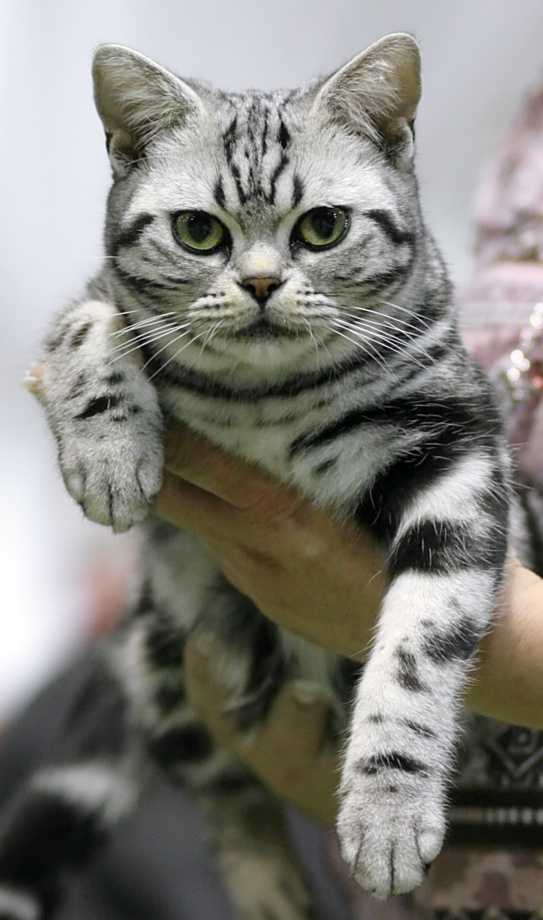
Black–silver tabby adult

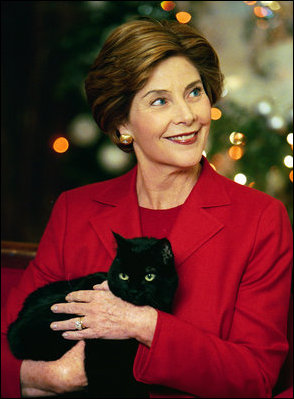
Laura Bush holding family cat India, a solid-black American Shorthair (2004)

== See also ==
- European Shorthair (or Celtic Shorthair), a similar modern breed derived from landrace European domestic short-haired cats.
- Exotic Shorthair
- British Shorthair
