= Mallory Square =

Location in Key West, Florida, United States

Coordinates: 24.5599756°N 81.8074276°W

Mallory Square entrance sign

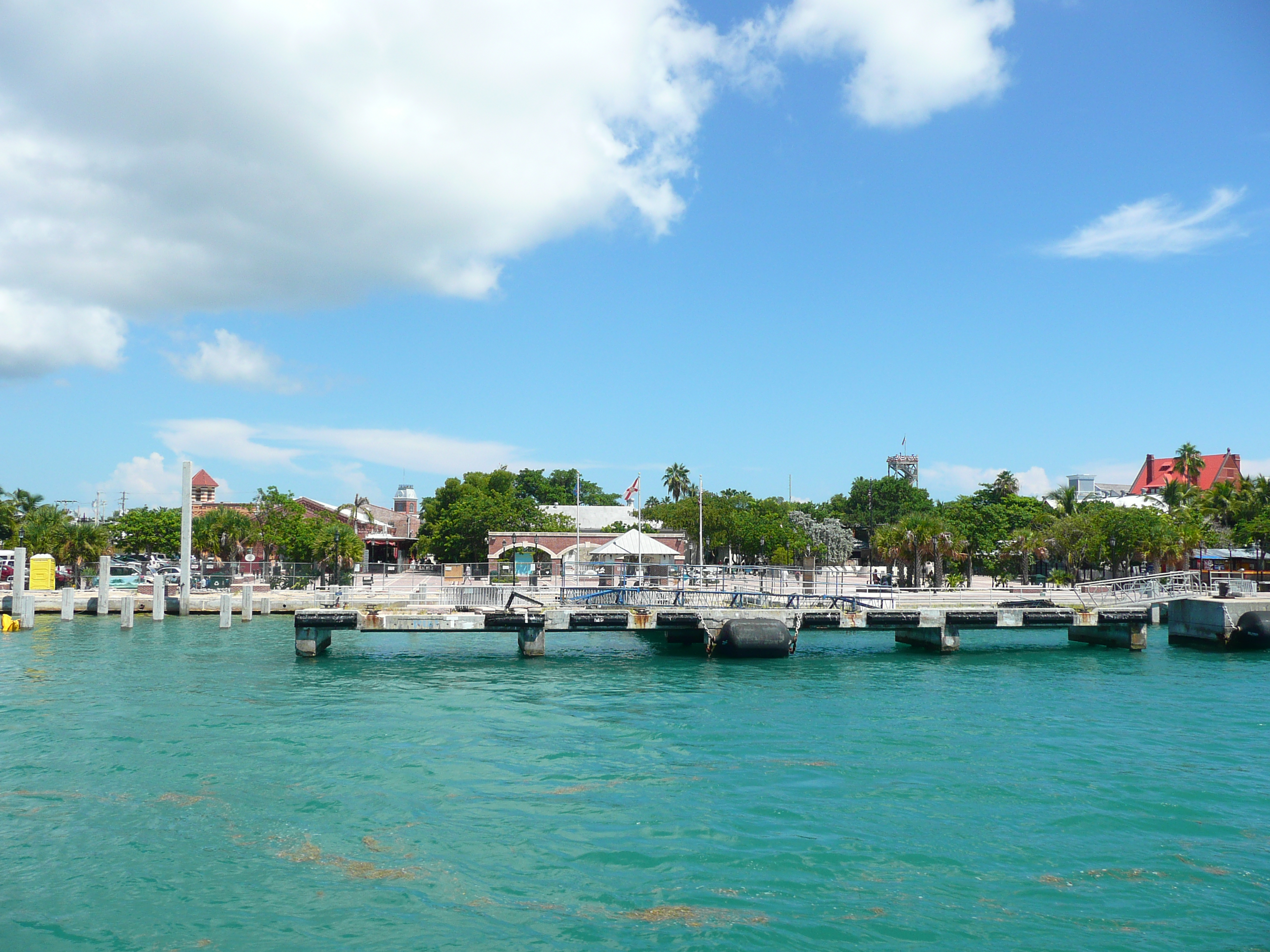
Mallory Square as seen from the Gulf of Mexico with Downtown Key West in the background.

Mallory Square is a plaza located in the city of Key West, Florida. It is located on the waterfront in Key West's historic Old Town, adjacent to the cruise ship port. It is located just west of the northern end of Duval Street, facing the Gulf of Mexico. It runs the entire length of Wall Street. Adjacent to the square are the Key West Shipwreck Historeum Museum and the Old Post Office and Customshouse.

== Sunset celebration ==
Mallory Square is the location of the "Sunset Celebration", which is considered one of the main tourist attractions of the city. The Sunset Celebration involves hundreds of tourists who arrive each night to view the sunset. The celebration includes arts and crafts exhibitors, street performers, and food carts. It begins two hours before sunset, every day of the year.

In 1984, the city opened a pier right on Mallory Square. The decision was met with considerable opposition from people who felt it would disrupt the tradition of watching the sunset at Mallory Square. In response to this, the city passed an ordinance requiring cruise ships to leave port two hours before sunset, enabling them to return after sunset without an additional docking fee.

== Memorial Sculpture Garden ==
The Key West Historic Memorial Sculpture Garden in Mallory Square contains bronze busts of people who had a major impact in Key West. There is a 20-foot (6.1 m) monument titled "The Wreckers" and 39 busts, honoring A. Maitland Adams, John Bartlum, Livingston W. Bethel, Jefferson B. Browne, Sandy Cornish, William Curry, Carlos M. DeCespedes, Nelson Francis de Sales English, Henry M. Flagler, Sister Louis Gabriel, Eduardo Gato, John Huling Geiger, Maria Gutsens, Dr. J. V. Harris, Charles Helberg, Ernest Hemingway, Lena Johnson, William R. Kerr, Elisabeth Merklin Knight Beiglett Smith, John Lowe Jr., Ellen Russell Mallory, Stephen R. Mallory, Judge William Marvin, Bernie C. Papy, Joe Pearlman, Dr. J. Y. Porter, Commodore David W. Porter, Peter Roberts, Capt. Edward "Bra" Saunders, John Watson Simonton, Julius Stone, Norberg Thompson, Asa Forseyth Tift, Charley Toppino, Harry S. Truman, William Whitehead, and Thomas Lanier "Tennessee" Williams, all sculpted by James Mastin.

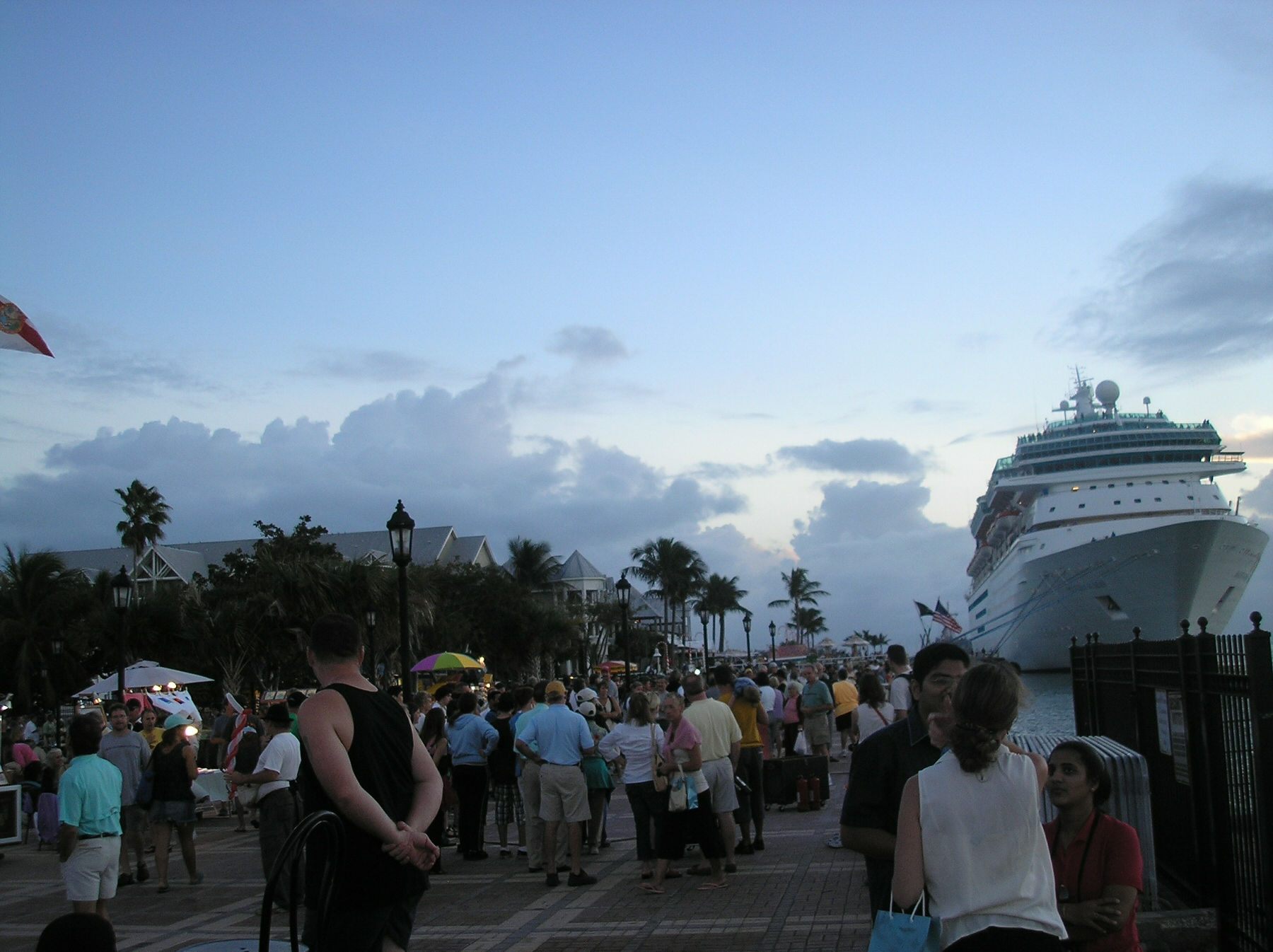
Tourists and the Majesty of the Seas

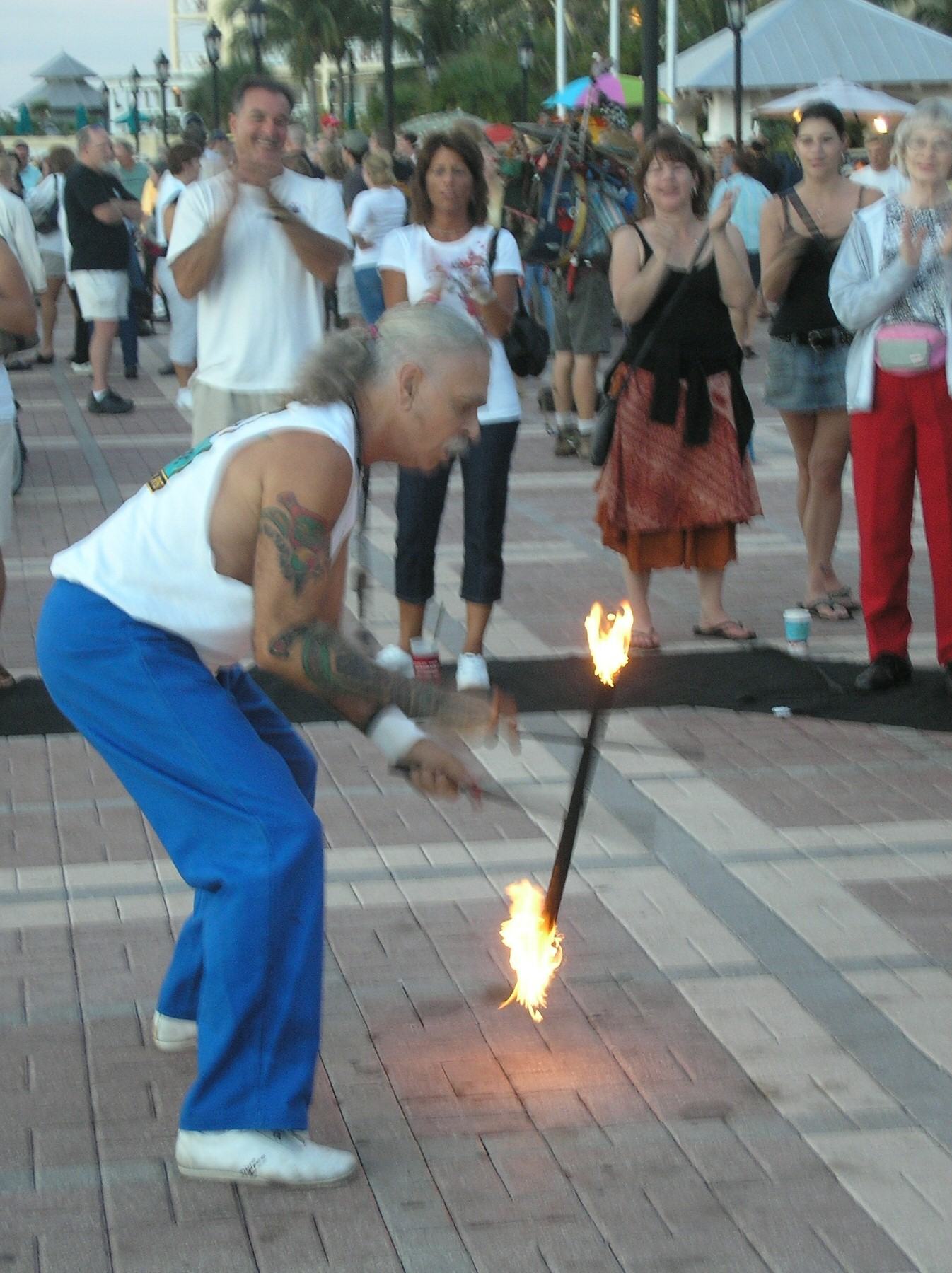
Street performer

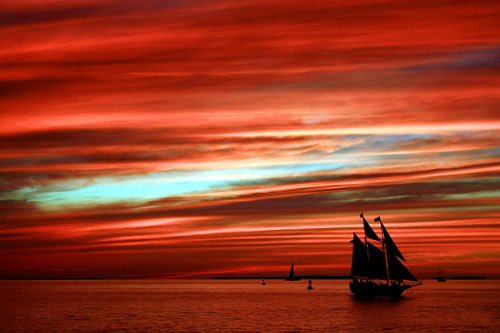
Sunset

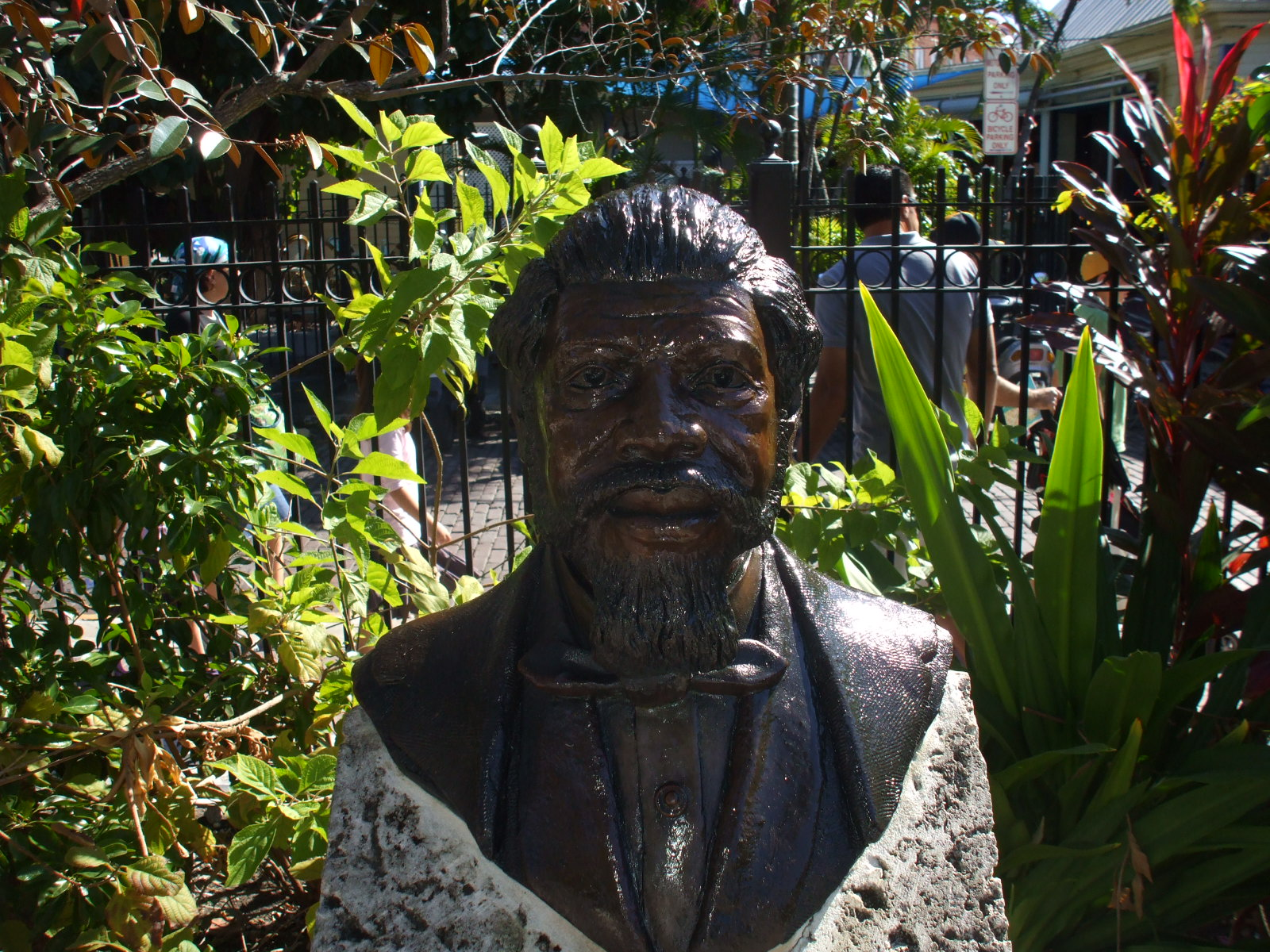
Bust of Sandy Cornish in the Memorial Sculpture Garden
