= Adolph "Doc" M. Ferguson =

Adolphus "Doc" Ferguson

Ferguson House, at 299 Front Street in Key West, Florida, c. 1890 (now part of the Truman Annex).

Adolphus Mallory "Doc" Ferguson (c. 1850s – April 1925) was an American entrepreneur, contractor, photographer, and civic figure in Key West, Florida. A native "Conch" born to a prominent local family whose wealth stemmed from the California Gold Rush, Ferguson engaged in a wide variety of island trades, including photography, dentistry, horse carriage operations, and concrete block manufacturing.

Ferguson owned and lived at 907 Whitehead Street from 1903 until his death in 1925. He lived there for 22 years between Asa Tift's ownership and its 1931 acquisition by author Ernest Hemingway.

== Early life and the Naval station expansion ==
Adolphus Ferguson was the youngest son of the Ferguson family of Key West, an influential merchant family that held extensive real estate along the island's harbor and inner residential streets. The main waterfront Ferguson family mansion on Front Street was acquired and condemned by the United States Navy in the early 1900s during the federal expansion of the Key West Naval Station, coal depot, and submarine base (now part of the Truman Annex).

Adolphus Ferguson resided at 218 Caroline Street, a property inherited through his mother, Rosalinda Ferguson. As the naval perimeter expanded around the waterfront and a wire wireless communications station was built toward Caroline Street, Ferguson sought a new primary residence, leading to his acquisition of the Tift estate.

== 907 Whitehead Street estate (1903–1925) ==
After original builder Asa Tift died in 1889, the estate at 907 Whitehead Street became entangled in 14 years of chancery litigation and probate disputes among out-of-state heirs. In 1898, the Monroe County Circuit Court appointed Ferguson as the legal custodian and caretaker to maintain the estate during the ongoing court proceedings.

When the court ordered a public partition auction in 1903 to settle the Tift estate, Ferguson purchased the property on the courthouse steps as the highest bidder. Relocating his household from Caroline Street, Ferguson maintained the native coral rock home and upkept the carriage house for his horses.

Locally known as "Doc," he worked as a photographer, artist, itinerant dentist, and horse-drawn carriage operator. He later co-founded Ferguson & Ward (with W. W. Ward), a local structural engineering and contracting firm located on Duval Street that manufactured structural concrete blocks for island construction projects.

Known across the island as a horse handler and carriage operator, Ferguson was also among the earliest Key West residents to own and operate an automobile. After acquiring 907 Whitehead Street in 1903, he eventually adapted the native stone carriage house to accommodate both his horses and early motor vehicles.

== Personal life, death, and estate transition ==
907 Whitehead, c. 1910. Taken from the top of the Key West Lighthouse

Ferguson was married to Margaret "Maggie" Ferguson, who died in the Whitehead Street home in 1918. Ferguson continued to live at the estate despite declining health and died there in April 1925.

He was interred alongside members of the Ferguson family in the historic Key West Cemetery.

His property passed through short-term intermediate owners, including Arthur H. Shephard and Paul Lumley, accumulating municipal back-tax liens. In April 1931, local banker Jerry Trevor cleared the encumbered title, enabling the estate's purchase by Gus Pfeiffer for his niece Pauline Pfeiffer and her husband, author Ernest Hemingway.
