= William Kerr (architect) =

Irish-American architect

"As an architect and builder, he showed more versatility and originality than any other builders of that period." A Guide to Key West

William Kerr (1836-1911) was an Irish-American architect.

The U.S. Custom House and Post Office under construction in Key West

Students and Sisters of the Holy Names gathered on the grand double staircase and ground level of the Convent of Mary Immaculate (Destroyed in 1969). William Kerr designed it in 1878, featuring signature Romanesque arches, stonework, mansard roofs, coal chimneys, and roof-to-cistern plumbing.

Born in Ireland and educated in Natick and Boston, Massachusetts, Kerr moved to Washington, D.C., in 1852, where he served an apprenticeship as a mechanic under George Nailor. At the outbreak of the Civil War, he joined the United States Civil Engineering Service, serving through 1866 before operating contracting businesses in Baltimore, Maryland, and Savannah, Georgia.

In 1872, Kerr relocated to Key West, Florida, initially working in a contracting partnership under the firm name McDermott & Higgs before establishing his independent architectural and building firm in 1885. In 1875, he constructed an artistic Carpenter Gothic cottage as his personal residence at 410 Simonton Street, featuring elaborate exterior gingerbread and interior frescoed scenes.

Throughout his career in Key West, Kerr designed and constructed numerous prominent public, private, commercial, and religious landmarks across the island, including the 1878 stone structure and 1903 brick expansion of the Convent of Mary Immaculate, the 1889 Monroe County Courthouse, the 1891 Old City Hall at 510 Greene Street, the First National Bank building at Front and Duval streets, and the old Masonic Temple on Simonton Street. He also served as the local superintendent of construction during the erection of the Old Post Office and Customhouse, completed in 1899.

As master builder for the Old Stone Church (First Methodist) on Eaton Street, Kerr utilized an innovative construction technique starting in the mid-1870s: building a native coral rock exterior around the congregation's temporary wooden building, allowing services to continue uninterrupted. Once the new church's stone shell was complete, the interior wooden structure was dismantled and hauled out the front doors, with Kerr overseeing completion in phases through 1892. Kerr employed a similar coral limestone masonry process for the 1878 Convent of Mary Immaculate and is credited with applying these native quarry techniques as the builder for Asa Tift's ca. 1870s estate at 907 Whitehead Street, built atop a quarried coral cellar that later became famous as the home of author Ernest Hemingway.

Kerr died in 1911 and is buried in the historic Key West Cemetery. He is honored with a bronze bust in the Key West Historic Memorial Sculpture Garden recognizing his major role in shaping Key West's architectural aesthetic.
