= Isaac Allerton (disambiguation) =

Isaac Allerton (c. 1586–1658/9) was a Mayflower pilgrim.

Isaac Allerton may also refer to:

- Isaac Allerton Jr. (1627–1702)
- Isaac Allerton (shipwreck)
