= Squitten =

Genetic deformation in domestic cats

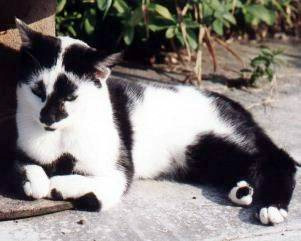
A squitten with the genetic deformity radial hypoplasia, showing twisted forelimbs

"Squitten" is a term used for a domestic cat with a genetic deformity which causes only partial formation or the complete absence of the radius bone, making the cat resemble a squirrel. The word is a portmanteau of squirrel and kitten. Also rarely used is the term "kangaroo cat", which derives from a 1953 specimen known as the Stalingrad Kangaroo Cat. Veterinarians recommend that cats with these congenital disorders be kept indoors and monitored by specialists, since long-term management of the condition is essential for their quality of life.

== Characteristics ==
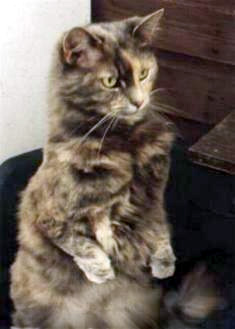
A squitten with foreleg micromelia sitting in an upright posture, showing short forelimbs

The term "squitten" generally refers to a cat with one of the medical conditions that causes malformed or stunted forelegs:

- radial hypoplasia (RH; underdeveloped radius bones)
- radial aplasia (absent radius bones)
- radial agenesis (failure of radius bones to form)
- foreleg micromelia (small forelegs)

Typical characteristics of a squitten are unusually short forelegs; a short radius and ulna which may be either severely shortened, twisted or absent; extra front toes; and normal-length hind legs. A cat with RH or similar mutations tends to move like a ferret, and tends to sit on its rump with its forelegs unable to touch the floor, making it resemble a squirrel or kangaroo. This raises special care considerations for owners of affected cats. Kittens may be unable to knead effectively with their short forelegs; kneading is required to stimulate milk flow in the mother. The short or twisted forelegs cause mobility problems and such cats may adapt by using their hind legs in a hopping gait.

=== Related conditions ===
Mild RH can cause the post-axial form of polydactyly, which is characterised by enlarged paws, extra three-jointed toes on the outer, little-toe side of the paws, and no thumb. This form of polydactyly is sometimes called "patty feet" or "hamburger feet" to distinguish it from "thumb" polydactyl cats, which are not affected. X-rays can determine the structure of the extra toes and whether the cat has the gene for RH.

A corresponding condition affecting the hind legs is called femoral hypoplasia and has only been reported three times in cats.

== Treatment ==
If diagnosed early, splinting can help realign the limb closer to its normal anatomical position and prevent complications such as ulna fractures, joint contractures, and muscle wasting. Since the condition is usually identified in kittens, splints must be adjusted frequently to accommodate growth and remain in place until skeletal maturity. In severe cases, surgical options (e.g. ulnocarpal arthrodesis or amputation) may be necessary. With proper care and treatment, most affected animals maintain a good quality of life, particularly in strictly indoor environments.

== Breeding regulations & ethics ==
The mutation naturally occurs in the random-bred cat population, particularly in inbred populations where recessive genes may be exhibited. Such cats have also been called "Twisty Cats". In the late 1990s, several of these cats were deliberately bred at Karma Farms, a horse farm and cattery in Marshall, USA, resulting in a public outcry.

The exact cause of these congenital disorders remains unclear, but evidence suggests a genetic basis. For this reason, breeding affected animals is not recommended. Many of the major cat registries do not allow the registry and breeding of squitten cats in their breeds, nor recognise them, due to concerns about the animal's welfare. The European Convention for the Protection of Pet Animals discourages deliberate breeding of these cats for two reasons, first that it falls under hypertyping (intentional breeding of extreme characteristics), and secondly that the position of the legs is abnormal. Under this convention breeding is effectively banned in the European Union:

Any person who selects a pet animal for breeding shall be responsible for having regard to the anatomical, physiological and behavioural characteristics which are likely to put at risk the health and welfare of either the offspring or the female parent.

— Chapter II - Article 5

Several countries and states (e.g. Austria, the Netherlands, and Victoria and the Australian Capital Territory in Australia) have prohibited breeding with a squitten parent cat.

== See also ==
- List of cat body-type mutations
- Cabbit—portmanteau of cat and rabbit
- Dwarf cat
- Munchkin cat
- Polydactyl cat
