= Sandy Cornish =

African American farmer, businessperson, and civic leader in Florida, USA

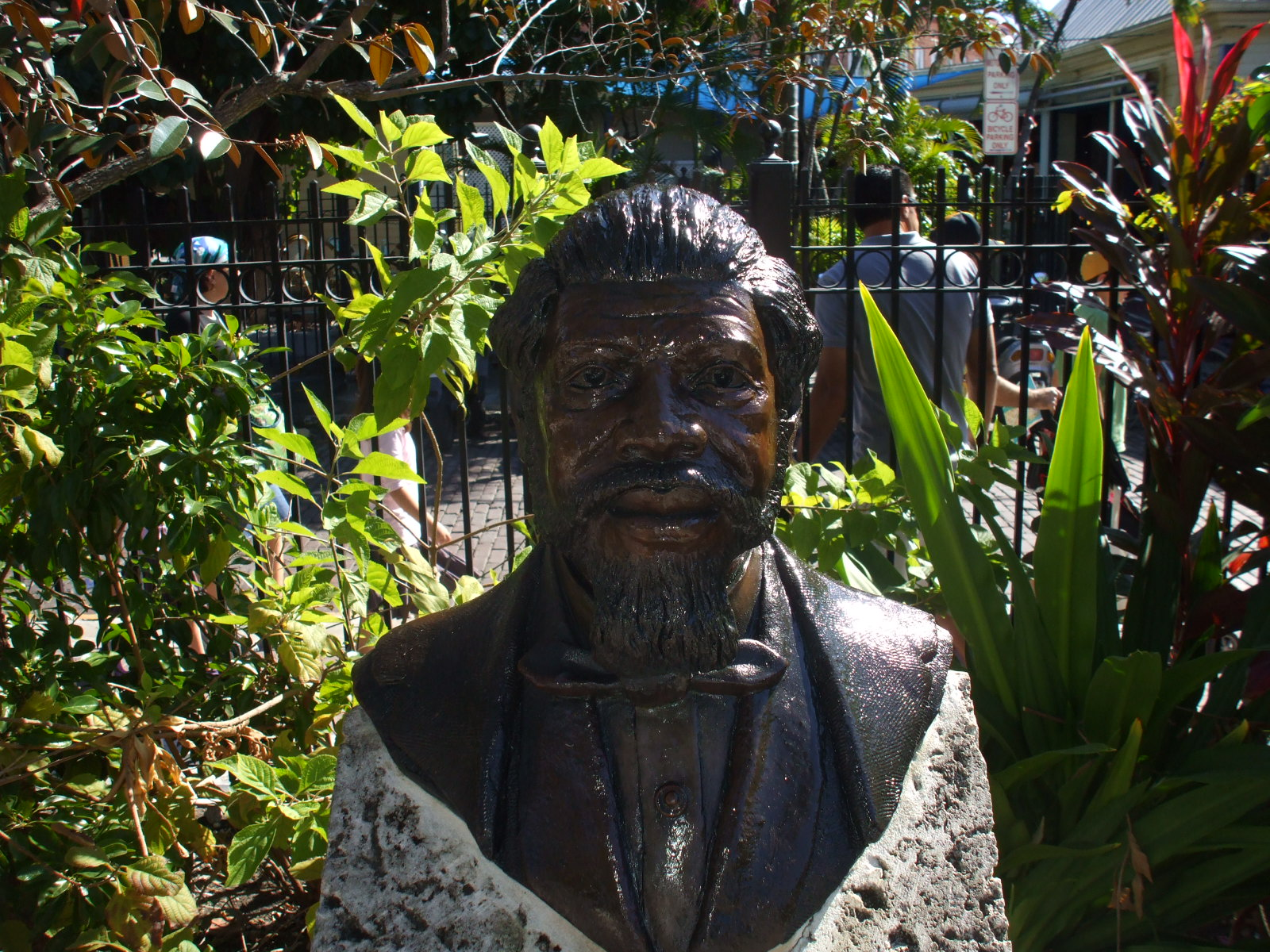
- Sculpture of Cornish in Mallory Square
- Born: 1793; Maryland
- Died: 1869 (aged 75–76); Key West, Florida
- Occupations: Farmer, civic leader
- Spouse: Lillah Cornish

Sandy Cornish (1793–1869) was an African American farmer, businessperson, and civic leader in Key West, Florida. As a former slave who purchased his freedom, he publicly maimed himself to prevent being returned to slavery.

== Slavery and freedom ==
Cornish was born into slavery in Maryland in 1793. In 1839, his owner hired him out to a railroad-building project in Port Leon, Florida. The position allowed Cornish to earn money for himself, and after nine years of work at $600 a year, he was able to purchase his freedom and that of his wife Lillah. However, the papers showing him to be free were destroyed in a fire. Lacking proof of his emancipation, he was seized by slave traders but managed to break free. The next day, he gathered a crowd of onlookers in Port Leon. He loudly proclaimed that having purchased his freedom once, he would not return to slavery under any circumstances. He then deliberately maimed himself, stabbing himself in the leg, slashing the muscles of one ankle, and cutting off a finger of his left hand, which he proceeded to sew back on with a needle and thread. These injuries made him worthless to enslave and thus immune to recapture. Friends took him home in a wheelbarrow, and he eventually recovered his health.

== Key West ==
Around 1850, Cornish and Lillah bought a Key West farm in the now Truman Avenue area near Simonton Street. Selling vegetables and fruits to residents, he became one of the wealthiest people in Key West. He was a leader of the local black community and the founder of the Cornish Chapel of the African Methodist Episcopal Church, now the Cornish Memorial AME Zion church and chapel, which still stands at 702 Whitehead Street.

He died in 1869 at the age of 76. He was buried in Key West Cemetery, but the location of his grave was lost to history. In 2014, the cemetery and the Historic Florida Keys Foundation installed a plaque to his memory. Speakers described his life as an inspiring testament to human freedom. City Commissioner Clayton Lopez, presiding over the ceremony, said, "His actions in life show that he was not going to accept the fate developed for him by lesser men. He is a legend that continues to point the way to human dignity to this day."

== Recognition ==
A memorial bust of Cornish is included in the Mallory Square Sculpture Garden, which honors people who had a significant impact on Key West.
