= Ernest Hemingway House =

House and museum in Key West, Florida

- U.S. National Register of Historic Places
- U.S. National Historic Landmark
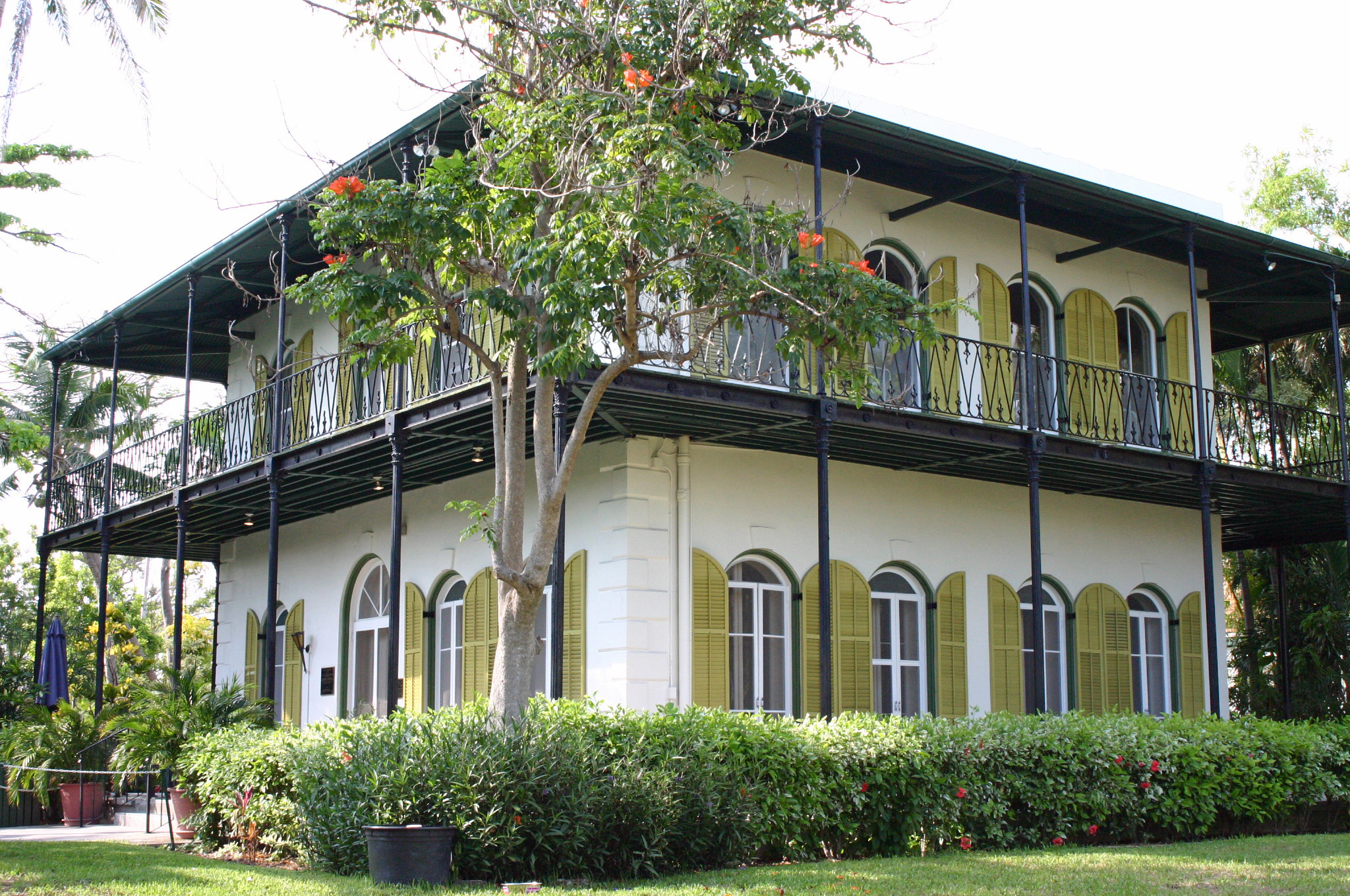
- Hemingway House in Key West, Florida
- Location: 907 Whitehead Street; Key West, Florida United States
- Coordinates: 24.55119°N 81.80060°W
- Built: ca. 1870s
- NRHP reference No.: 68000023

Significant dates
- Added to NRHP: November 24, 1968
- Designated NHL: November 24, 1968

The Ernest Hemingway House was the residence of American writer Ernest Hemingway in the 1930s. The house is situated on the island of Key West, Florida. It is at 907 Whitehead Street, across from the Key West Lighthouse, close to the southern coast of the island. Due to its association with Hemingway, the property is the most popular tourist attraction in Key West. It is also famous for its large population of so-called Hemingway cats, many of which are polydactyl.

The residence dates back to 1851 and was built in the 1870s in a French Colonial style by wealthy marine architect and salvager Asa Tift. From 1931 to 1939, the house was inhabited by Hemingway and his wife Pauline Pfeiffer. They restored the decaying property and made several additions. During his time at the home, Hemingway wrote some of his best-received works, including the non-fiction work Green Hills of Africa (1935), the 1936 short stories "The Snows of Kilimanjaro" and "The Short Happy Life of Francis Macomber", and the novels To Have and Have Not (1937) and Islands in the Stream (1970). (Note: The novel was discovered and published posthumously.) After the Hemingways' divorce and deaths, the house was auctioned off and subsequently converted into a historic house museum in 1964. On November 24, 1968, it was designated a National Historic Landmark.

== History ==
=== Early history ===
HABS FL-179

On July 28th, 1851, Asa Tift bought Square 9, Lot 2 at 907 Whitehead Street for $100, a fair asking price for an undeveloped one-acre parcel on the Southern edge of town. It is thought that the home was likely built after the Civil War in the 1870's by one of Key West's most versatile and talented architects of the era, William Kerr. Historical structural analysis of the home attributed a "strong possibility" to Kerr, who is credited with building other major Key West landmarks of native stone. The house's site, across the street from the Key West Lighthouse, has an elevation of 16 feet (4.9 m) above sea level, making it the second-highest site on the island. In addition to the elevation, the house's 18-inch (46 cm) thick limestone walls protect it during tropical storms and hurricanes. Following Asa Tift’s death, the estate passed through a public auction in 1903 to Adolph "Doc" M. Ferguson, eventually moving through subsequent owners before Jerry Trevor stepped in as the financial arranger and buyer who helped secure the property for Ernest Hemingway in 1931.

=== Hemingway ===
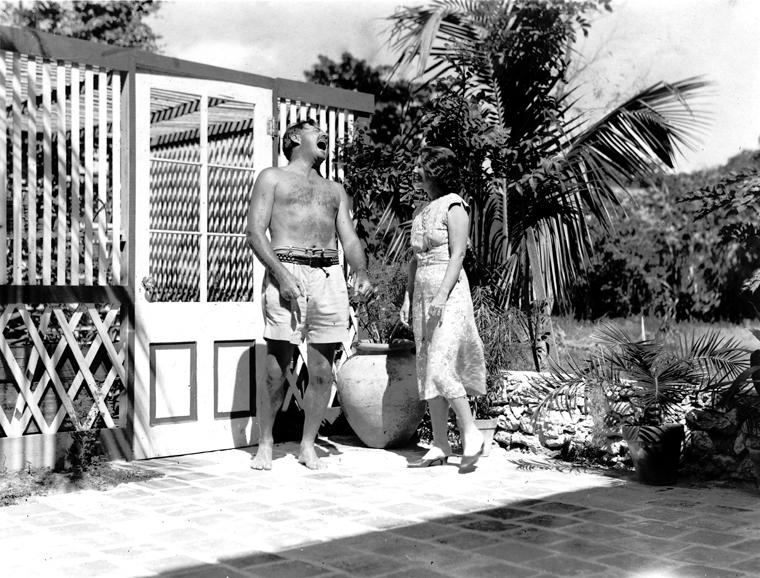
Ernest Hemingway with wife Pauline on the house's grounds in the 1930s

In 1928, writer Ernest Hemingway and his wife Pauline Pfeiffer moved to Key West, where they spent the next three years living in rented housing, the last being a two-story home at 1301 Whitehead Street.

When Pauline had first seen 907 Whitehead Street during a house-scouting tour, she labeled it a "damned haunted house". At the time, the house was in foreclosure and was in deep disrepair. However, after recognizing its potential, she convinced her wealthy Uncle Gus to purchase it at $8,000 for her and Ernest as a wedding present. Ernest appreciated the seclusion that the 1.5-acre (0.61 ha) lot would offer him while writing his works. Employing out-of-work Conchs, the Hemingways restored the entire house. Most of the house's inner furnishings were selected by Pauline, but Ernest insisted on the inclusion of his hunting trophies. At the cost of air circulation, Pauline replaced the house's ceiling fans with chandeliers. The couple also converted the second story of the carriage house into a writing studio for Ernest and transformed the basement into a wine cellar.

Ernest Hemingway and his three sons in the courtyard (ca. 1935)

While Hemingway was reporting in Spain in 1937, Pauline installed a large pool on the grounds. The first swimming pool in the Florida Keys, the 24 x 60-foot 80,000 US gal (300,000 L; 67,000 imp gal) pool was immensely expensive. At $20,000, it was two and a half times the purchase price of the entire property. Upon his return, Hemingway was irate at the costly addition. With a melodramatic flourish, he threw a penny from his pocket onto the ground, declaring, "You might as well take my last cent," despite the fact that Pauline had paid for it herself. She kept the penny and later had it embedded in the concrete. Despite his initial rage, the pool grew on Hemingway, and he later had a 6-foot (1.8 m) brick wall erected around the property so that he could swim nude. Hemingway also kept peacocks on the property and organized boxing matches on the lawn.

While living at the house, Hemingway wrote some of his best-received work, including the 1935 non-fiction work Green Hills of Africa, the 1936 short stories "The Snows of Kilimanjaro" and "The Short Happy Life of Francis Macomber", and his 1937 novel To Have and Have Not. After his death, a manuscript was discovered in a vault in the garage; this work was published posthumously in 1970 as Islands in the Stream. After eight years of residing at the house, Hemingway moved to Cuba in 1939.

Following their 1940 divorce, Pauline lived in the house until her death in 1951 and the house remained vacant afterward. The ownership of the house remained in Hemingway's name until his suicide in July 1961. Later that year, his three children auctioned off the house for $80,000.

=== Modern museum ===
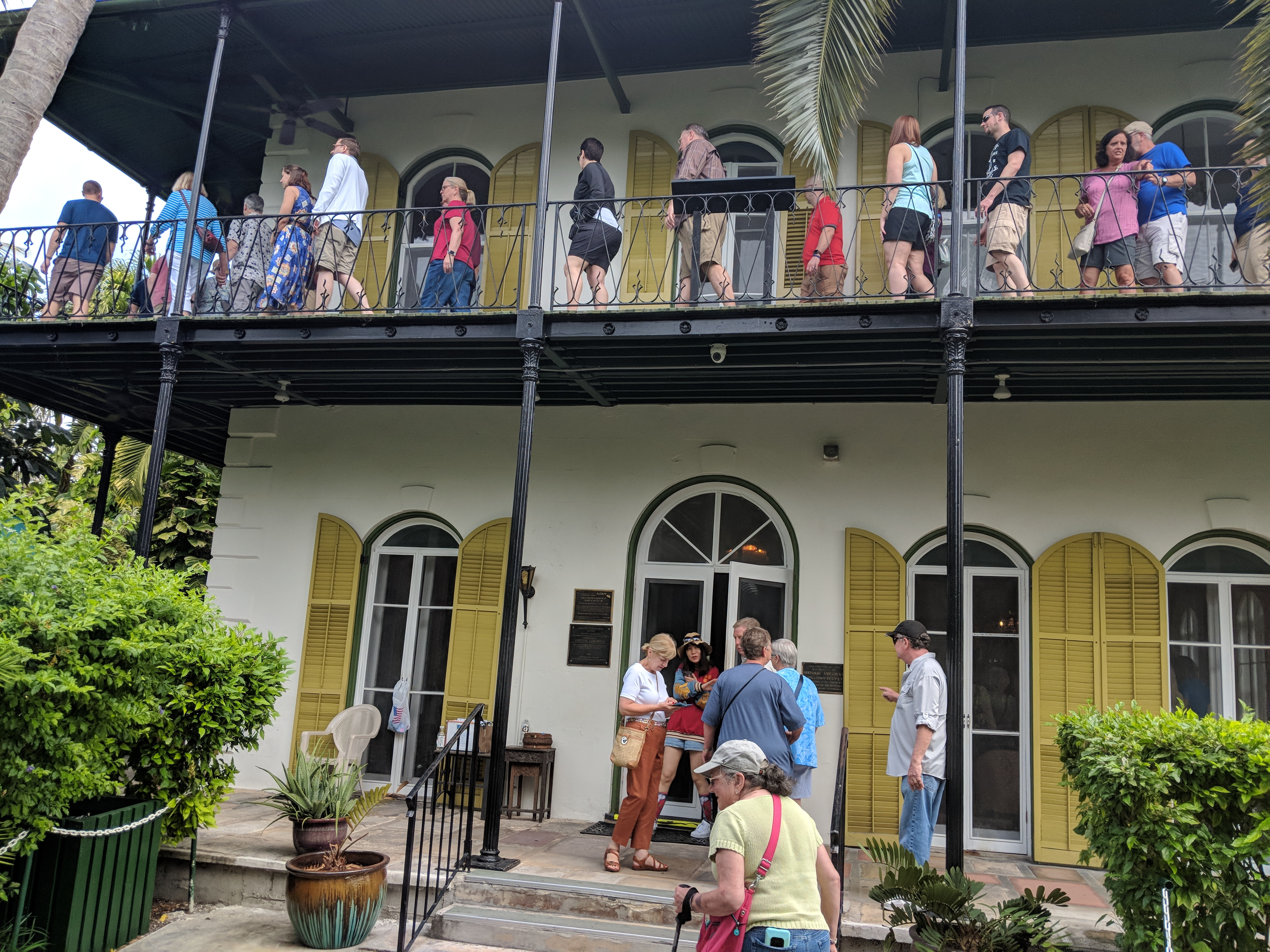
Tourists visiting the home in 2019

The new owners intended to use the Hemingway House as a private residence. However, due to persistent interest from visitors, they opened the house to the public as a museum in 1964. Although Hemingway's family had taken away much of the furnishings, the owners still possessed the bulkier furniture and many of Hemingway's possessions. As a result of not all furniture being original, the authenticity of the museum has received some criticism.

Alexa Morgan, Director of Media at the Hemingway Home and Museum, told Florida Weekly that the site is open daily, 365 days of the year, and receives 600 to 800 visitors a day. These visitors include Hemingway's literary followers, historians, aficionados of the grounds and gardens, and the animal lovers who want to see the cats.

All of the house's rooms are open to visitors, except for Hemingway's writing room, which can only be viewed through a screen. The property is the most popular tourist attraction in Key West. In 2024, on the 125th anniversary of his birth, Hemingway's home was named in a poll the most popular celebrity landmark in Florida and the 14th most popular nationwide.

Before Hurricane Irma struck the Keys in September 2017, the entire population of the island chain was ordered to evacuate by the federal government, but the museum's curator, general manager, and a team of employees declined to leave the house or evacuate its cats. Hemingway's granddaughter also urged them to evacuate, saying, "It's just a house." Instead, several employees chose to stay with the cats and the house. They survived the storm intact.

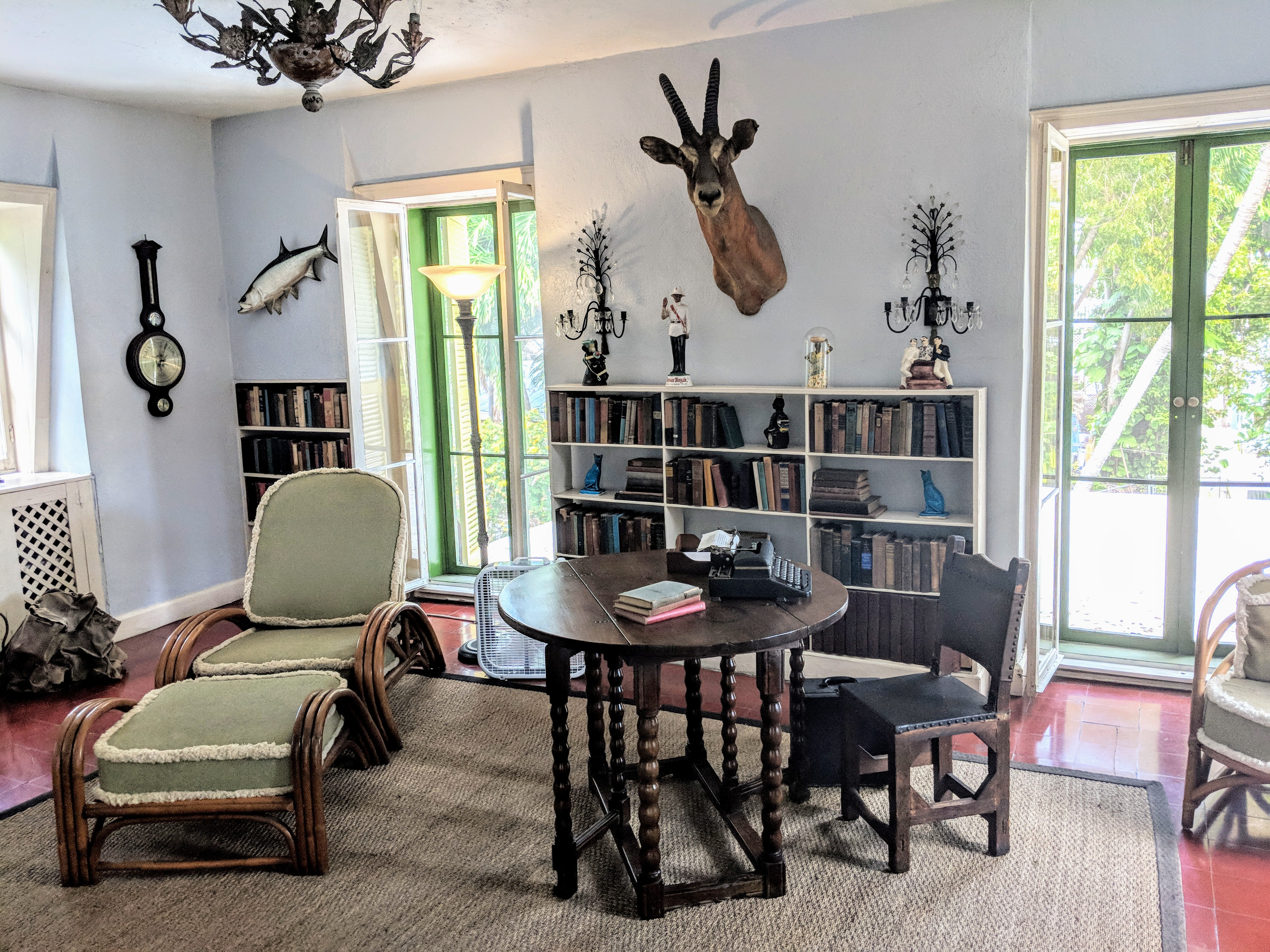
Hemingway's writing studio

Due to the COVID-19 pandemic and consequent decline in tourism, the museum laid off over 30 employees, half of their staff.

The estate was threatened again by Hurricane Ian in late September 2022. Prior to the storm, Hemingway's granddaughter, actress Mariel Hemingway, told The Daily Mail that she feared her grandfather's estate would be destroyed by the hurricane. "If any of his houses were destroyed, the pain and sorrow would be palpable. It would be upsetting if any of his houses were affected," she said, referring to Hemingway's properties in Havana, Cuba, and Ketchum, Idaho. The Museum was fortunately closed for only one day. Director Alexa Morgan said that the home received minor damage, and all 59 cats remained safe. The cats were in a secure area of the estate and a few staff members stayed on the property to feed them.

== Cats ==
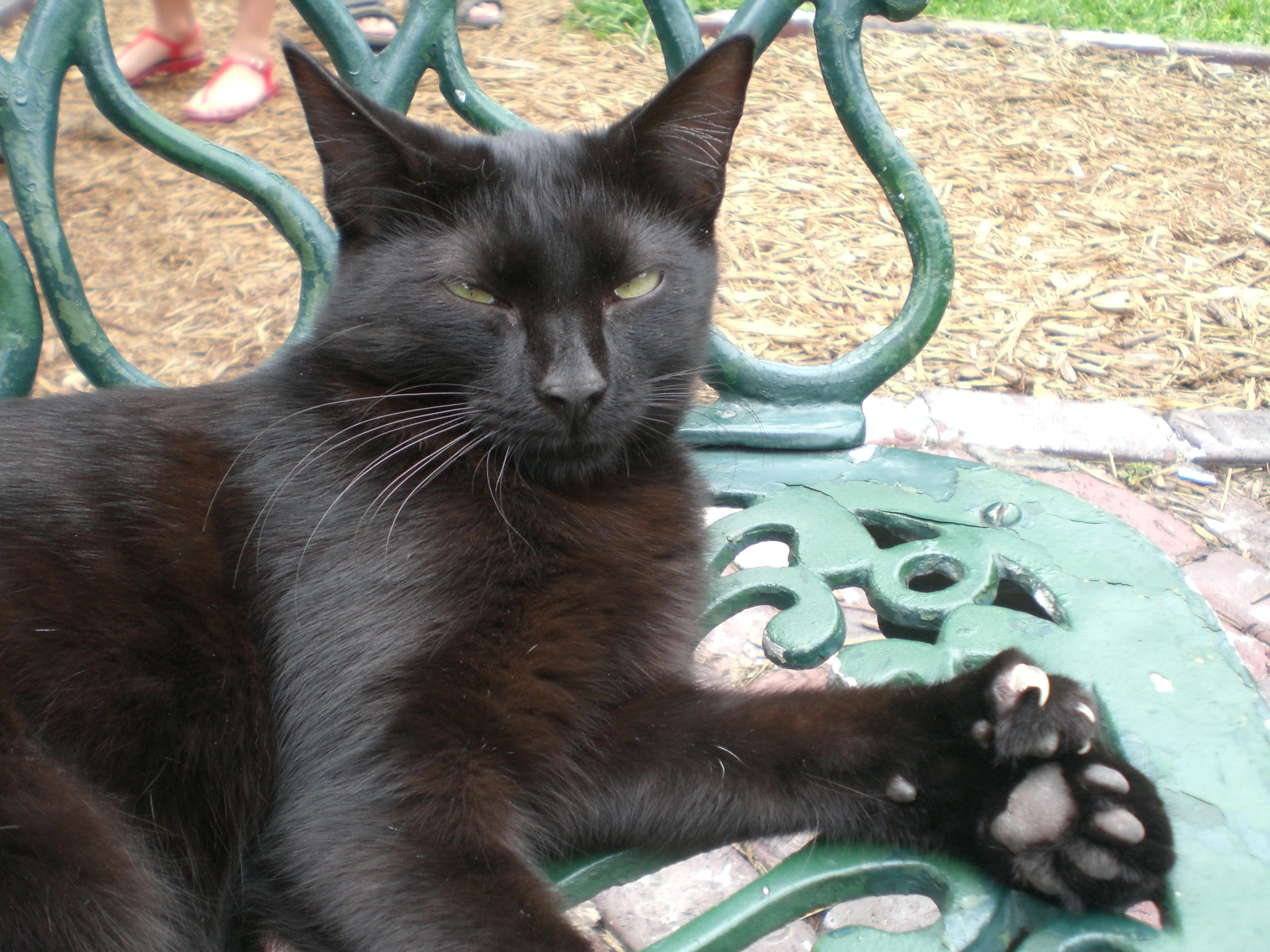
One of the many polydactyl cats that live on the property

The house and its grounds are inhabited by dozens of cats (59 of them as of 2024), commonly called Hemingway cats.

The Hemingway Home website says, "About half of the cats at the museum have the physical polydactyl trait, but they all carry the polydactyl gene in their DNA, which means that the ones that have 4 and 5 toes can still mother or father six-toed kittens. Most cats have extra toes on their front feet and sometimes on their back feet as well. Sometimes it looks as if they are wearing mittens because they appear to have a thumb on their paw ... Key West is a small island and it is possible that many of the cats on the island are related. The polydactyl cats are not a particular breed. The trait can appear in any breed, Calicos, Tabbies, Tortoise Shell, White, Black, etc. They vary in shapes, sizes, colors and personalities. Hemingway named all of his cats after famous people so we follow that same tradition today."

Around half are polydactyl, sporting six toes on each paw. The cats bear the names of celebrities, such as Humphrey Bogart or Marilyn Monroe, and have their own cemetery in the house's garden. Media Director Morgan says that the staff becomes excited when kittens are born. "We get to vote for their names when there's a litter,” she says, explaining that the felines are given names of famous contemporaries of Hemingway, such as Marilyn Monroe and Joe DiMaggio. "We've got John Wayne. And because she was born while Hemingway was alive, we got to have a Betty White," since the actress was a pet enthusiast and animal welfare advocate.

Legend has it that all cats on the property are descended from Snow White, a white six-toed cat (Note: Seafaring legend holds that six-toed cats bring good fortune.) given as a gift to the Hemingways by a sea captain. However, Hemingway's niece, Hilary, and his son, Patrick, have both contested the claim that Hemingway owned cats in Key West. A neighbor allegedly owned several polydactyl cats and some, such as Hilary, have suggested that these are the forebears of the Hemingway cats. Adding to the confusion, a photograph exists of a young Patrick and Gloria (Hemingway's daughter) playing with a white cat in Key West. When asked about the image, Patrick said he could not remember the incident.

Beginning in 2003, the museum was embroiled in a nine-year legal struggle against the United States Department of Agriculture (USDA) over whether the Animal Welfare Act of 1966, which typically regulates zoos and circuses with big cats, applied to the museum's six-toed feline population. The USDA argued that the Hemingway House was essentially a zoo, with the cats functioning as an exhibit. The USDA even sent undercover agents to monitor the cats in 2005 and 2006. The museum owners contested the USDA's claims in court. When an investigator for People for the Ethical Treatment of Animals (PETA) examined the cats in 2005, they concluded: "What I found was a bunch of fat, happy and relaxed cats." Ultimately, in 2012, the United States Court of Appeals for the 11th Circuit ruled that the Animal Welfare Act was applicable because the museum used cats in advertisements and sold cat-themed merchandise.

== Gallery ==
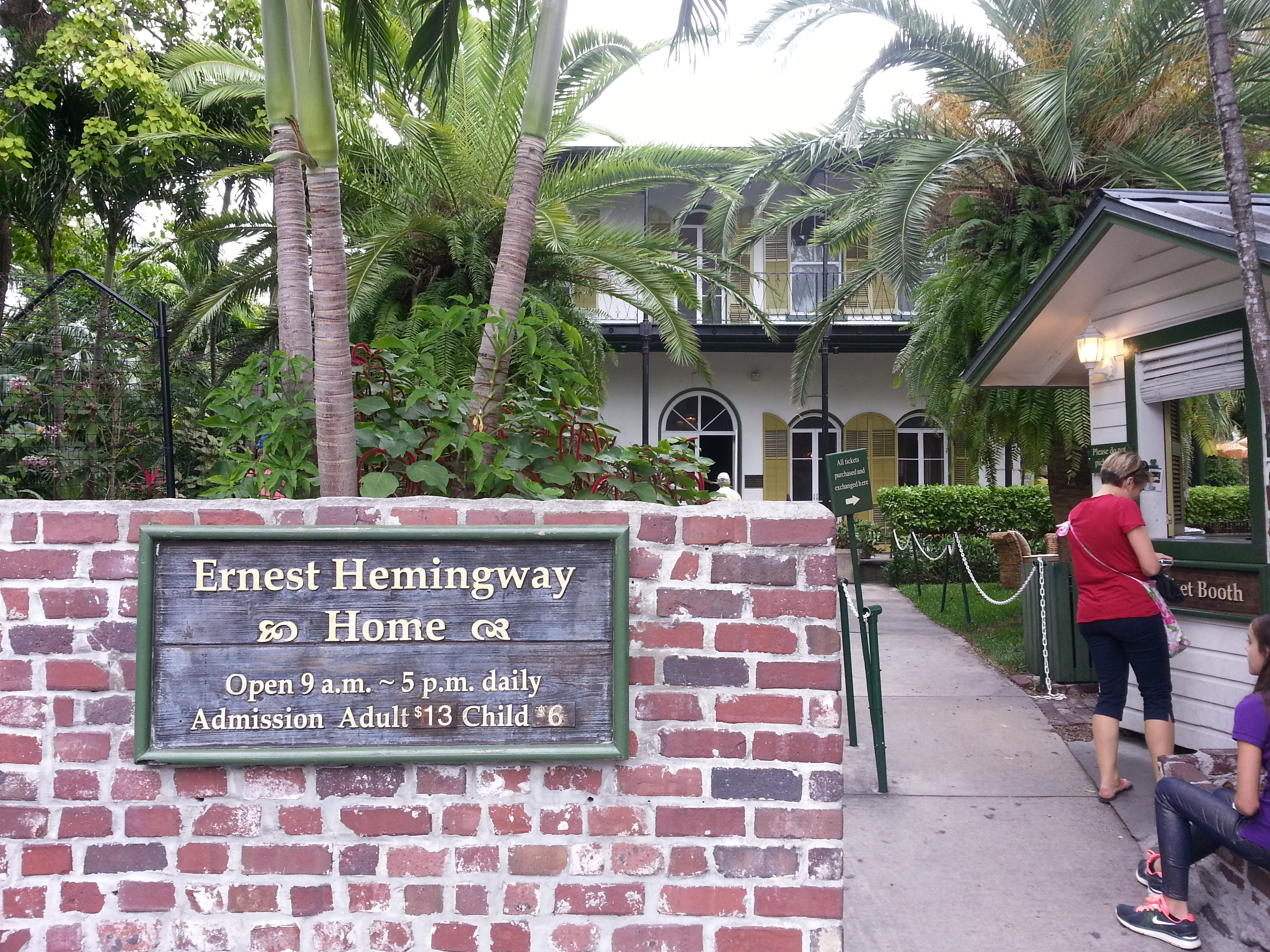
Entrance to the property

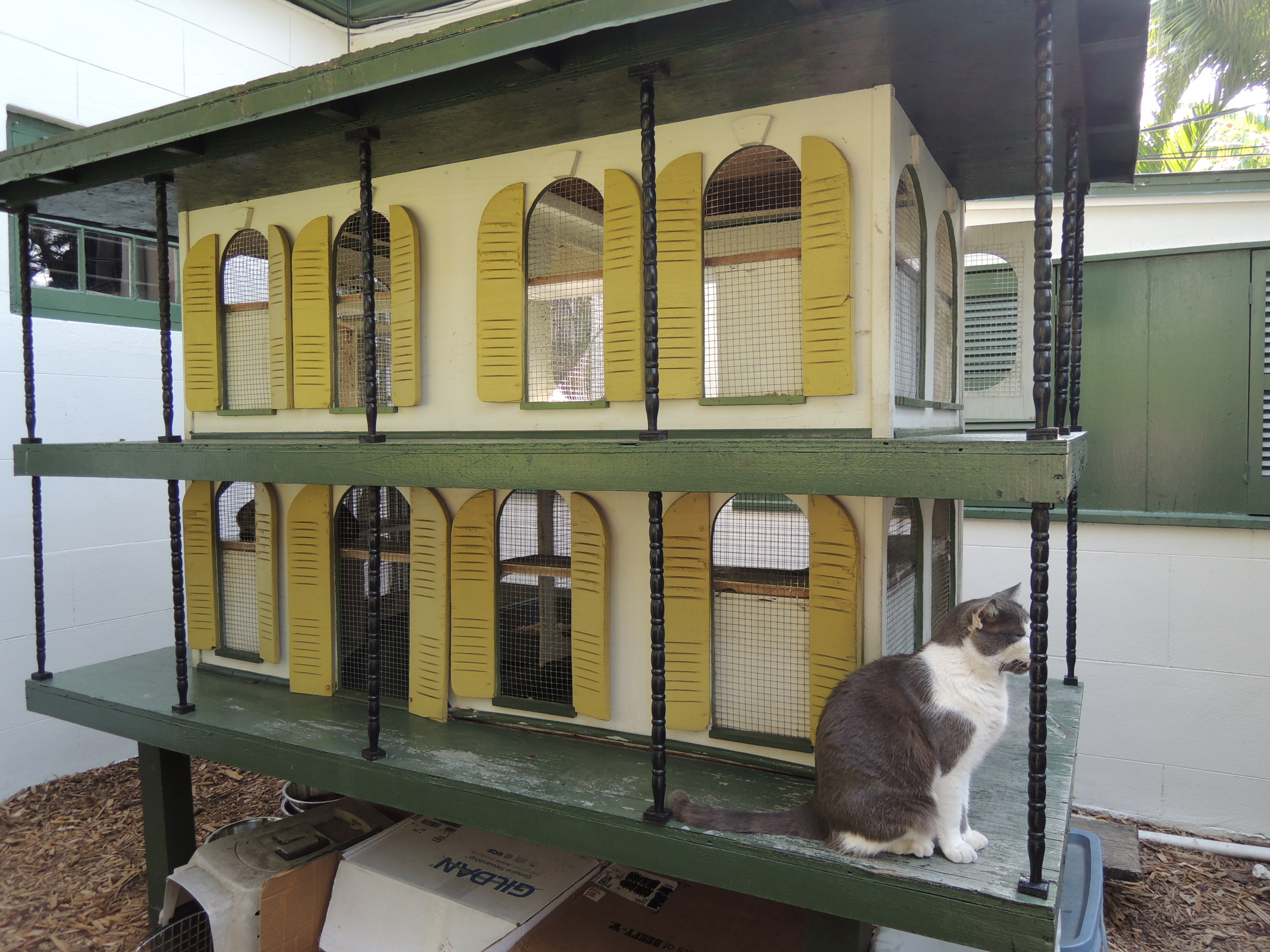
A miniature house for the cats

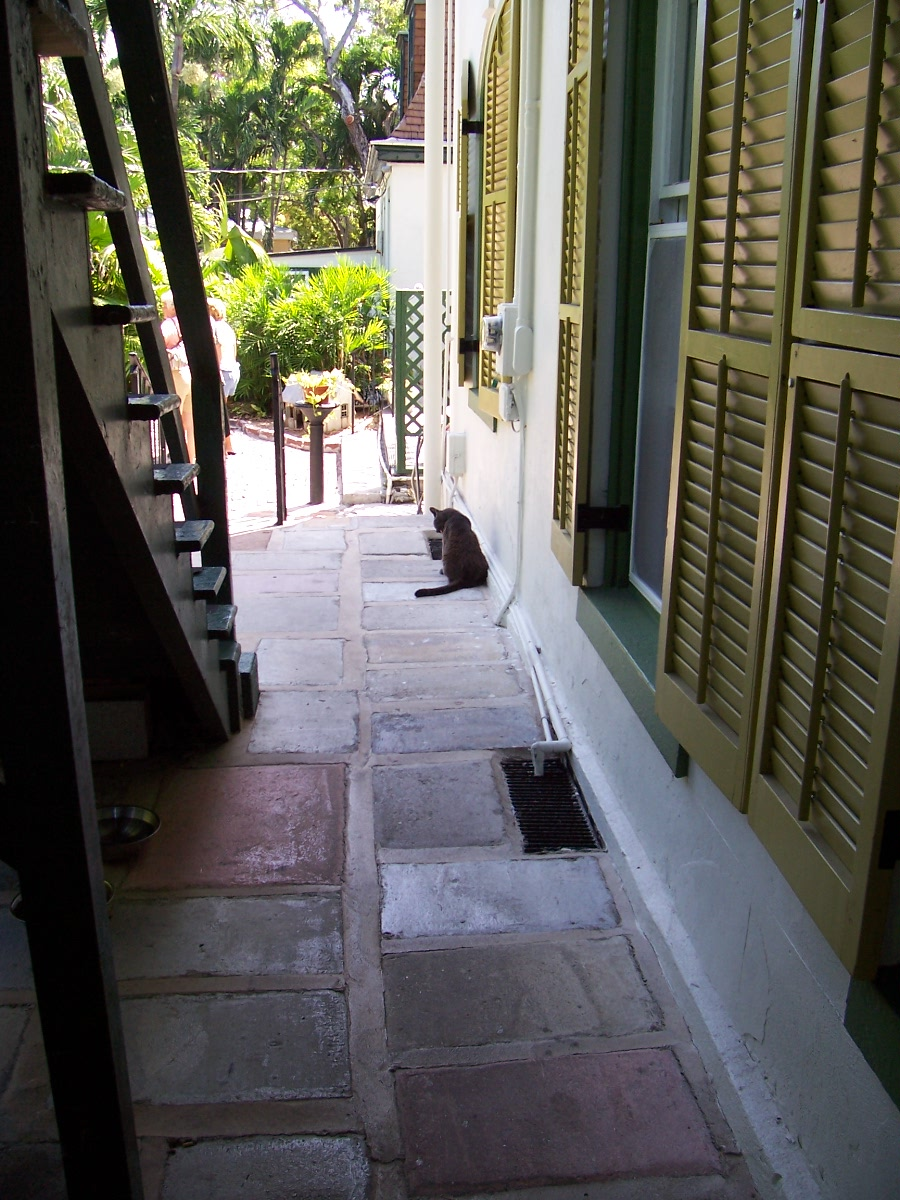
A cat lies on the porch

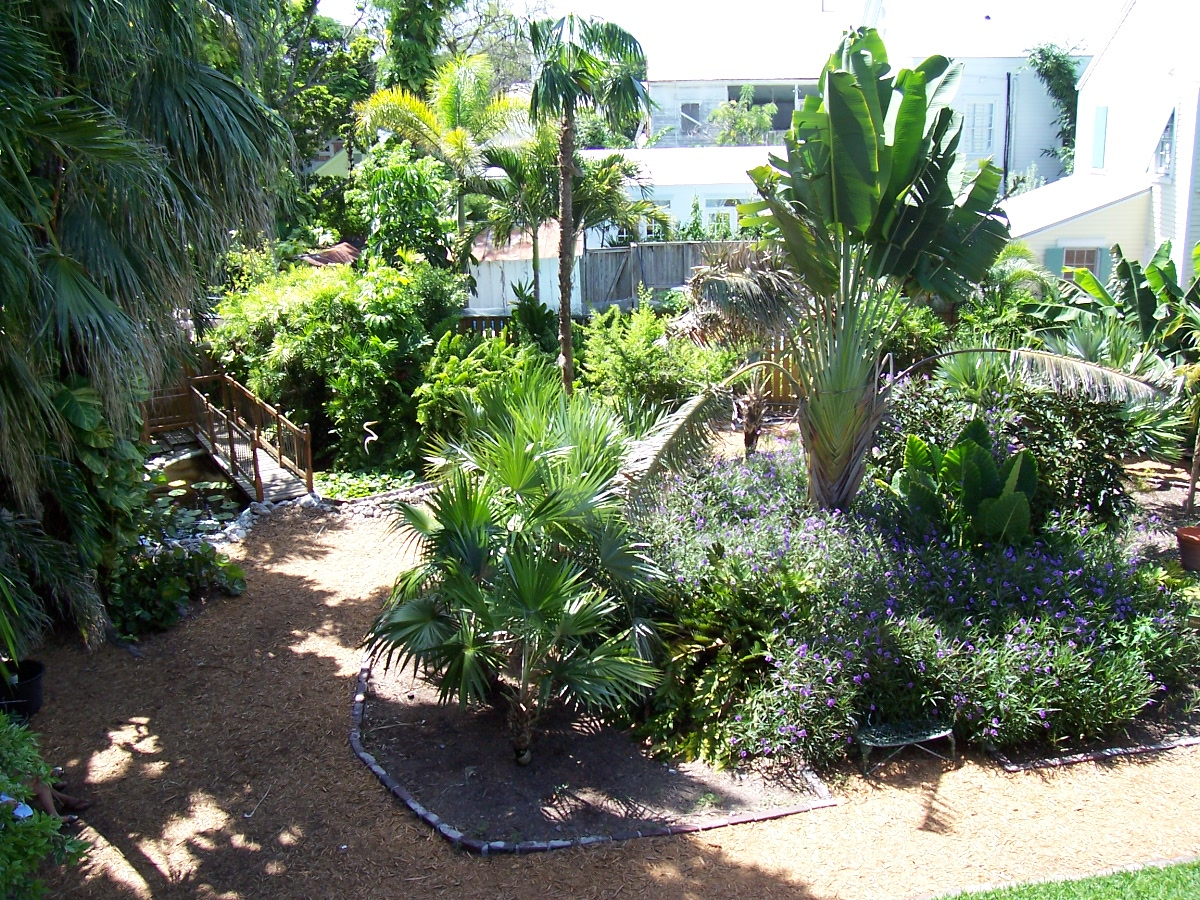
Garden

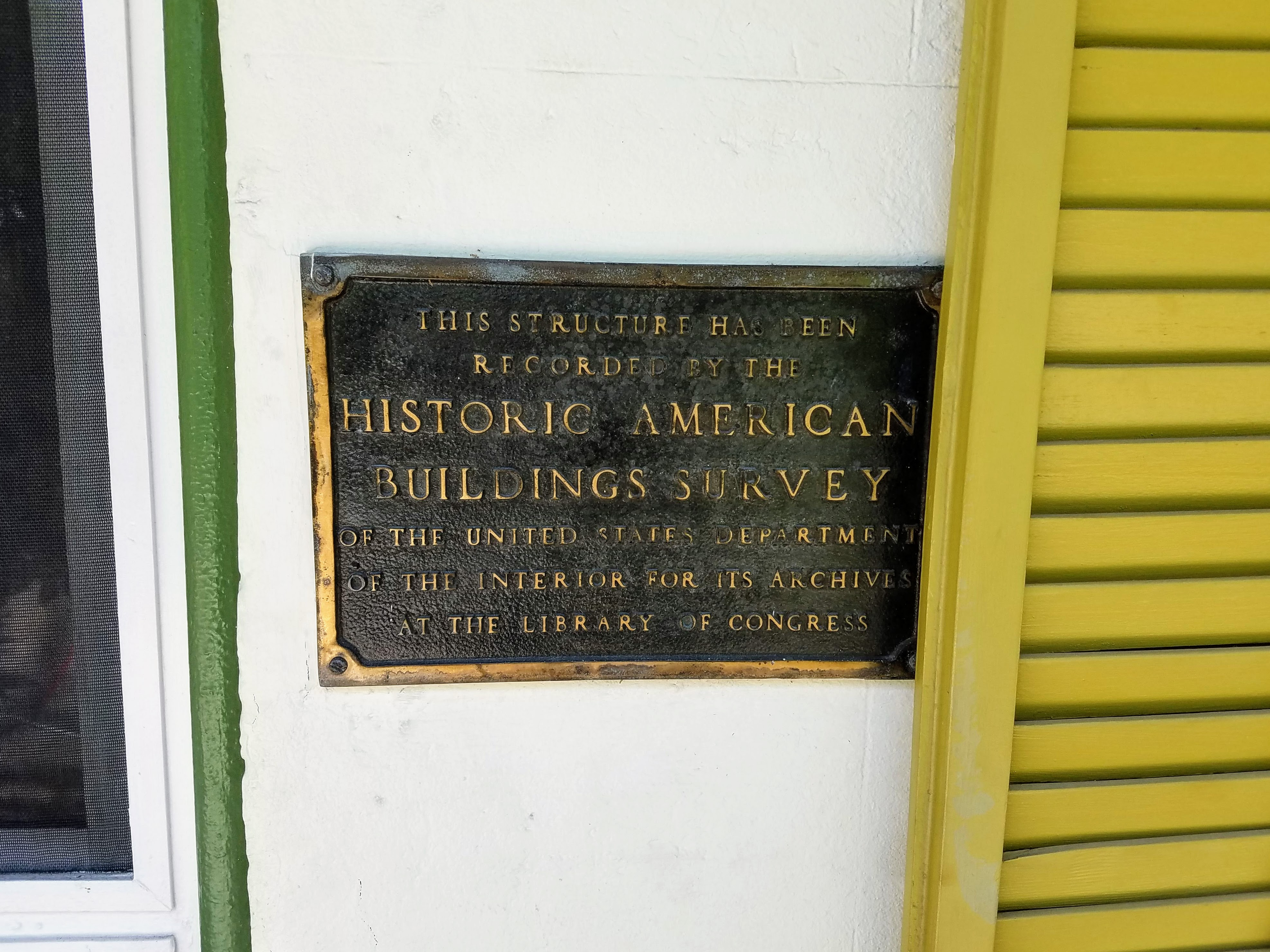
Ernest Hemingway House Historic American Buildings Survey (HABS) plaque

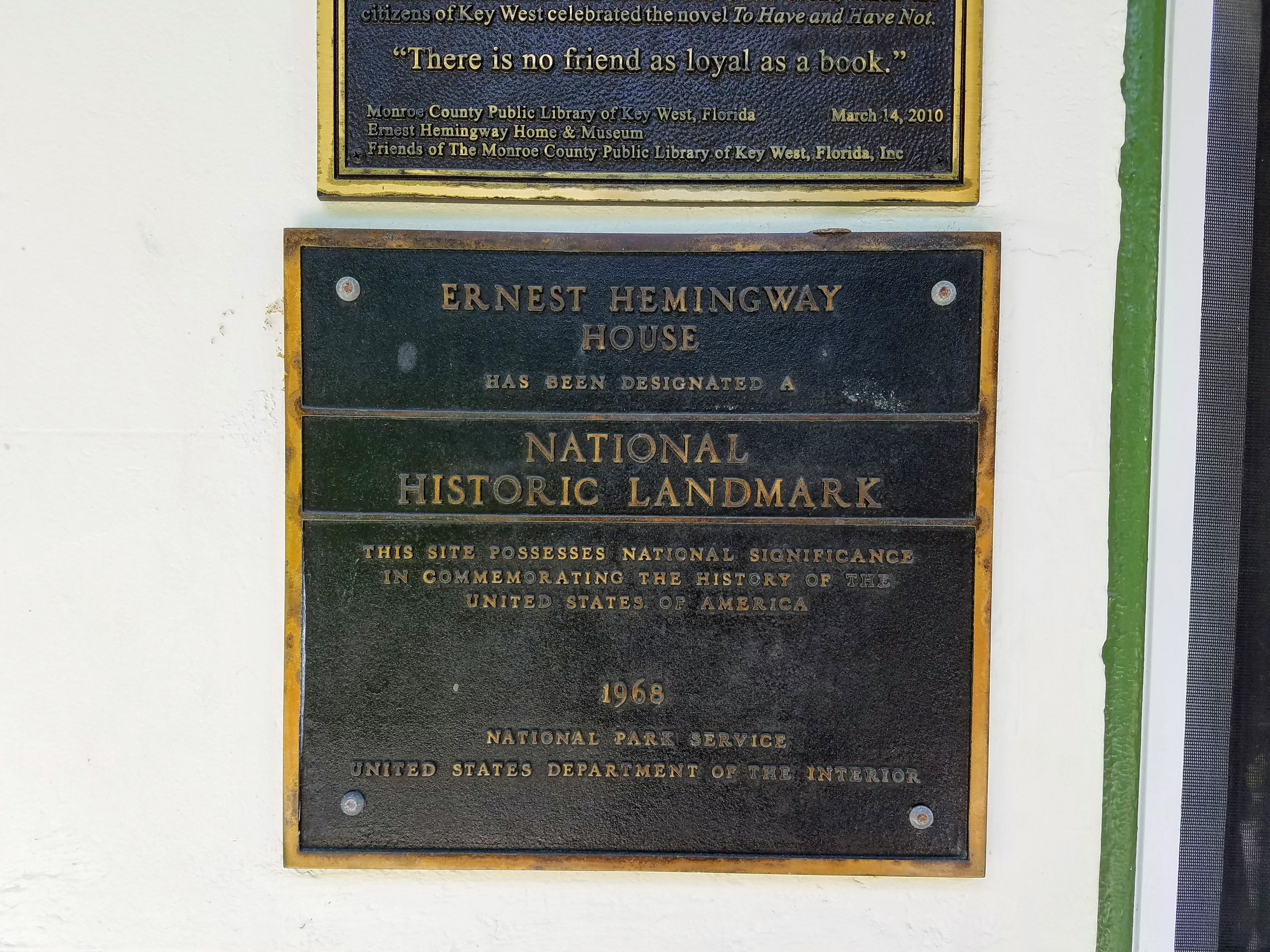
Ernest Hemingway House National Historic Landmark plaque
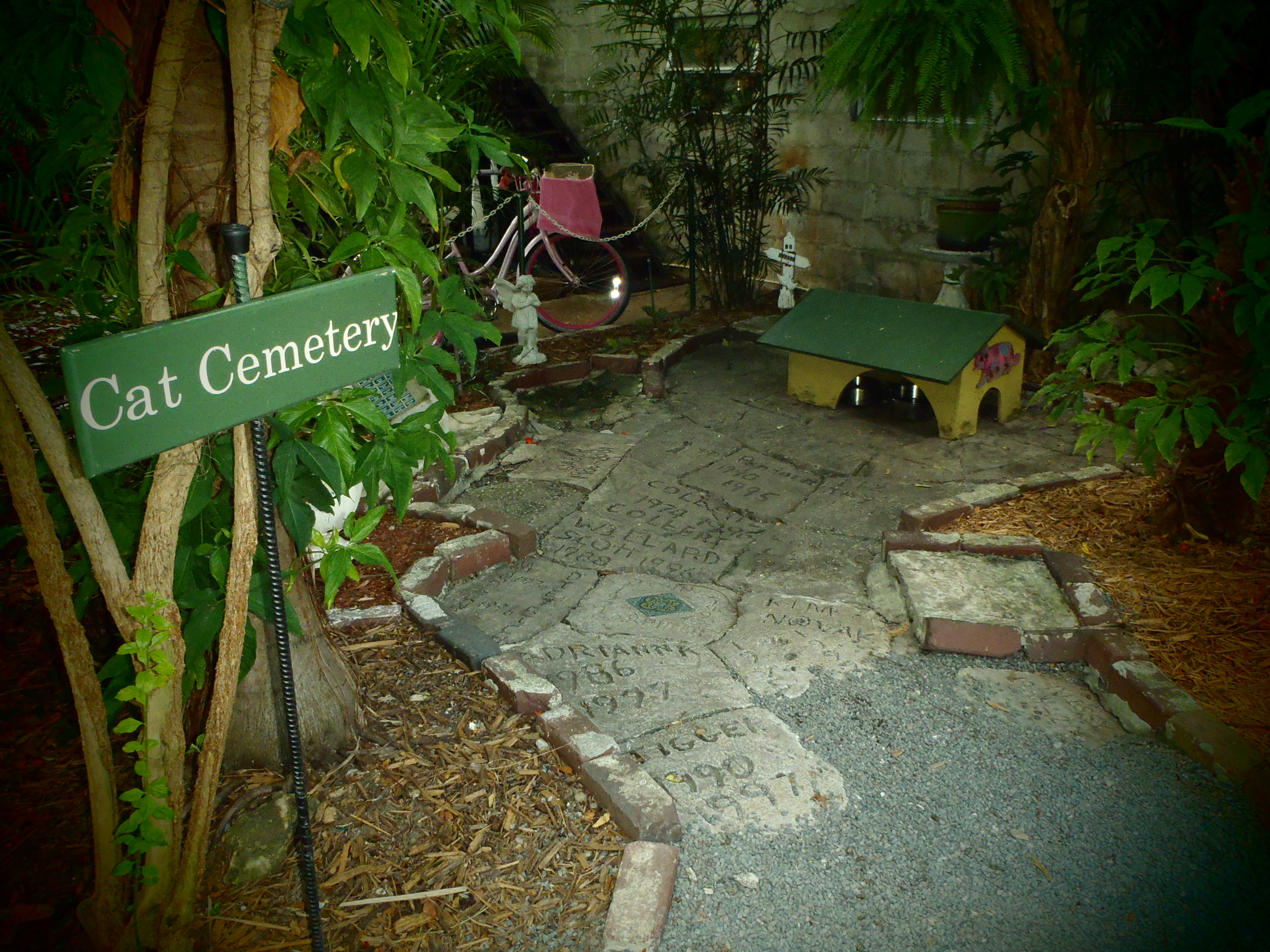
The cat cemetery

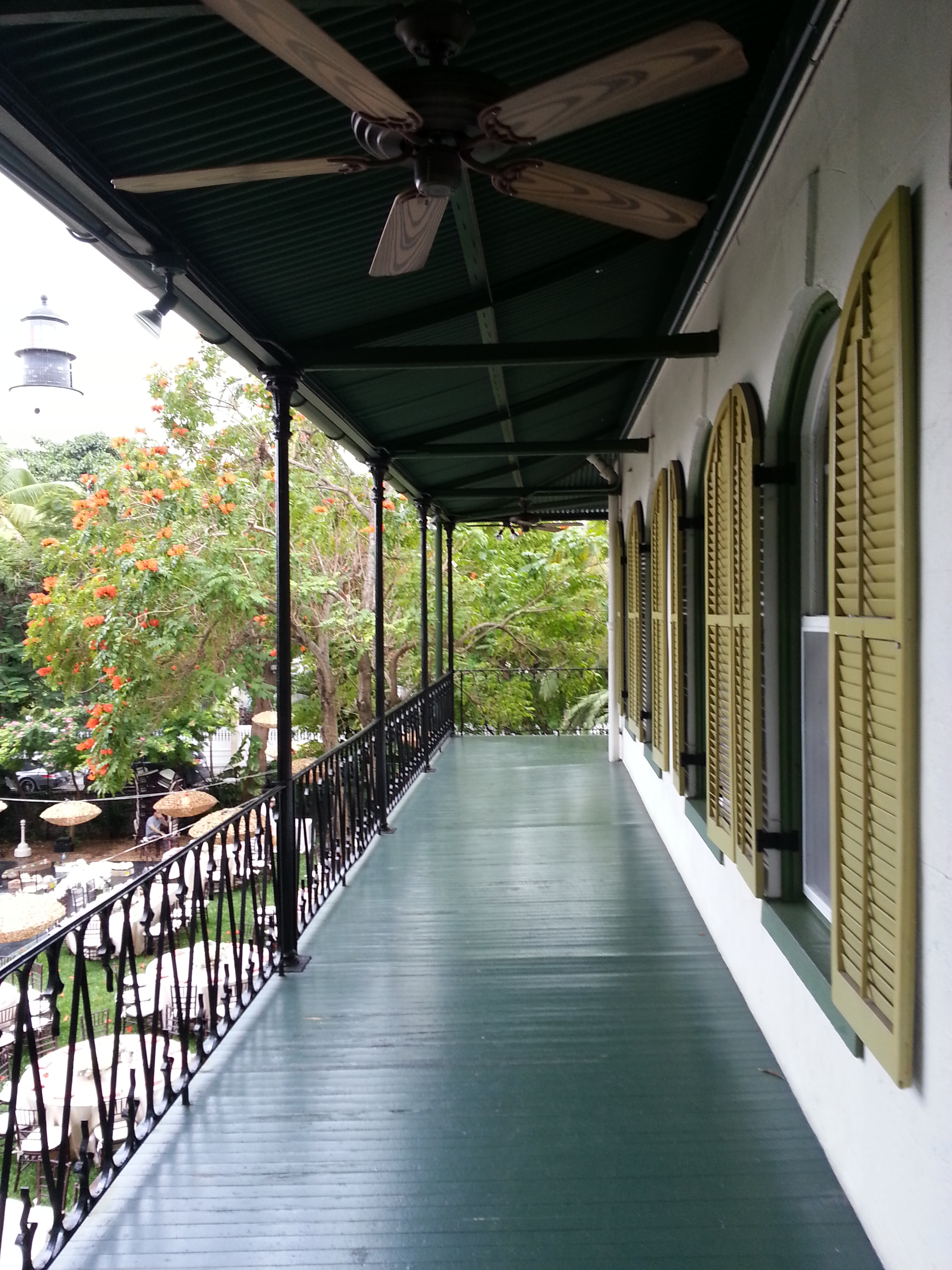
The house's veranda

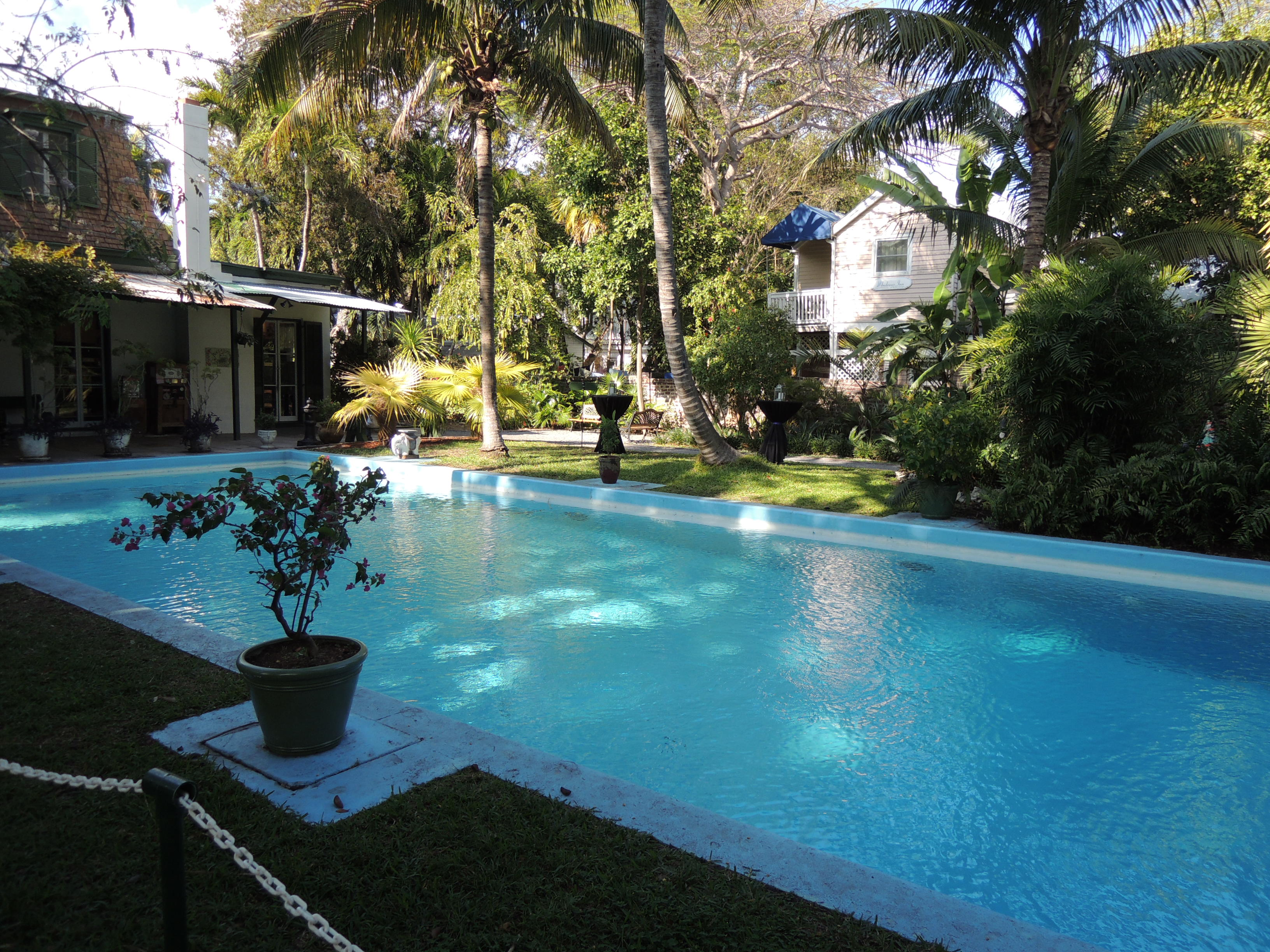
Hemingway's pool

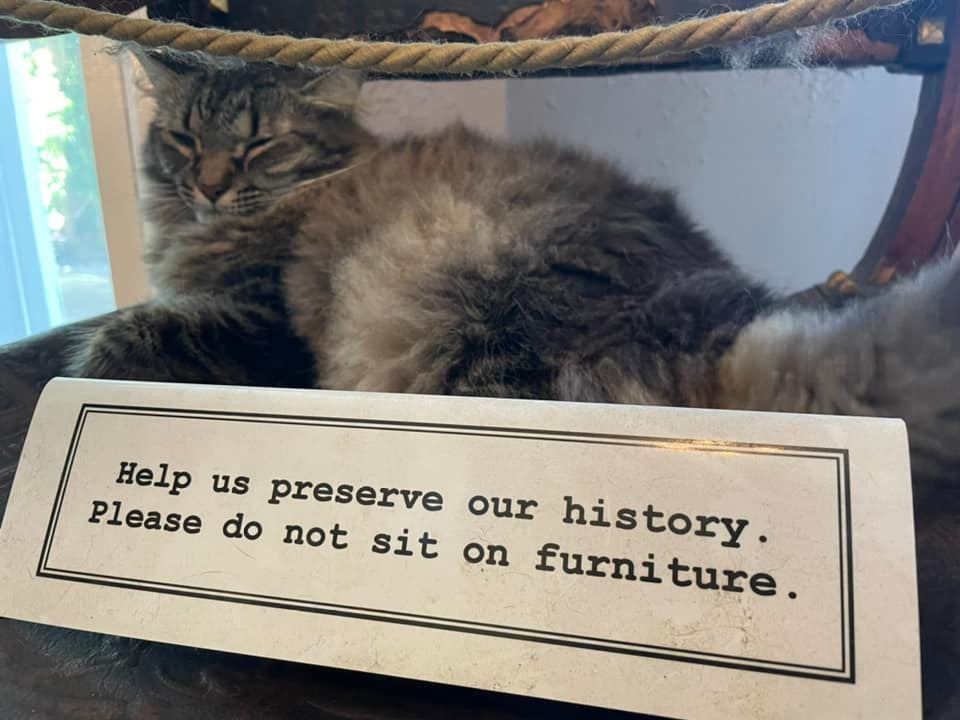
A cat breaks the rules of the house

== See also ==
- Birthplace of Ernest Hemingway
- Ernest and Mary Hemingway House
- Ernest Hemingway Cottage
- List of residences of American writers

== Notes and references ==
=== Works cited ===
- Brennen, Carlene Fredericka; Hemingway, Hilary (2015). Hemingway's Cats. Florida: Pineapple Press. ISBN 9781561646487.
- McIver, Stuart B. (2002). Hemingway's Key West. Florida: Pineapple Press. ISBN 9781561642410.
