= Paddles (cat) =

Pet owned by Jacinda Ardern (2016–2017)

- Species: Cat
- Sex: Female
- Born: 2016
- Died: 7 November 2017 (aged about one); Point Chevalier, Auckland, New Zealand
- Known for: Rescue cat kept by the Prime Minister of New Zealand
- Owner: Jacinda Ardern
- Appearance: Ginger and white, polydactyl
- Twitter page

Paddles (2016 – 7 November 2017) was a ginger and white polydactyl cat owned by former New Zealand Prime Minister Jacinda Ardern and her partner Clarke Gayford during Ardern's term in office. Paddles had a profile on Twitter and was known in politics as the "First Cat".

== Biography ==
Paddles was a rescue cat, adopted by Ardern from a branch of the SPCA.

She became a celebrity as the "First Cat" after Ardern took office, and a Twitter account was established in her name. Ardern said that she did not know who created the account. When U.S. President Donald Trump phoned Ardern to congratulate her for becoming prime minister in October 2017, Paddles interrupted the conversation, meowing loudly.

Paddles was run over by a car and killed in the Auckland suburb of Point Chevalier on 7 November 2017. Ardern's neighbour reportedly admitted to hitting the cat with his car. After writing Ardern an apology card with his children, Ardern called him to say thank you.

== See also ==
- List of individual cats
