= Eduardo H. Gato House =

- U.S. National Register of Historic Places
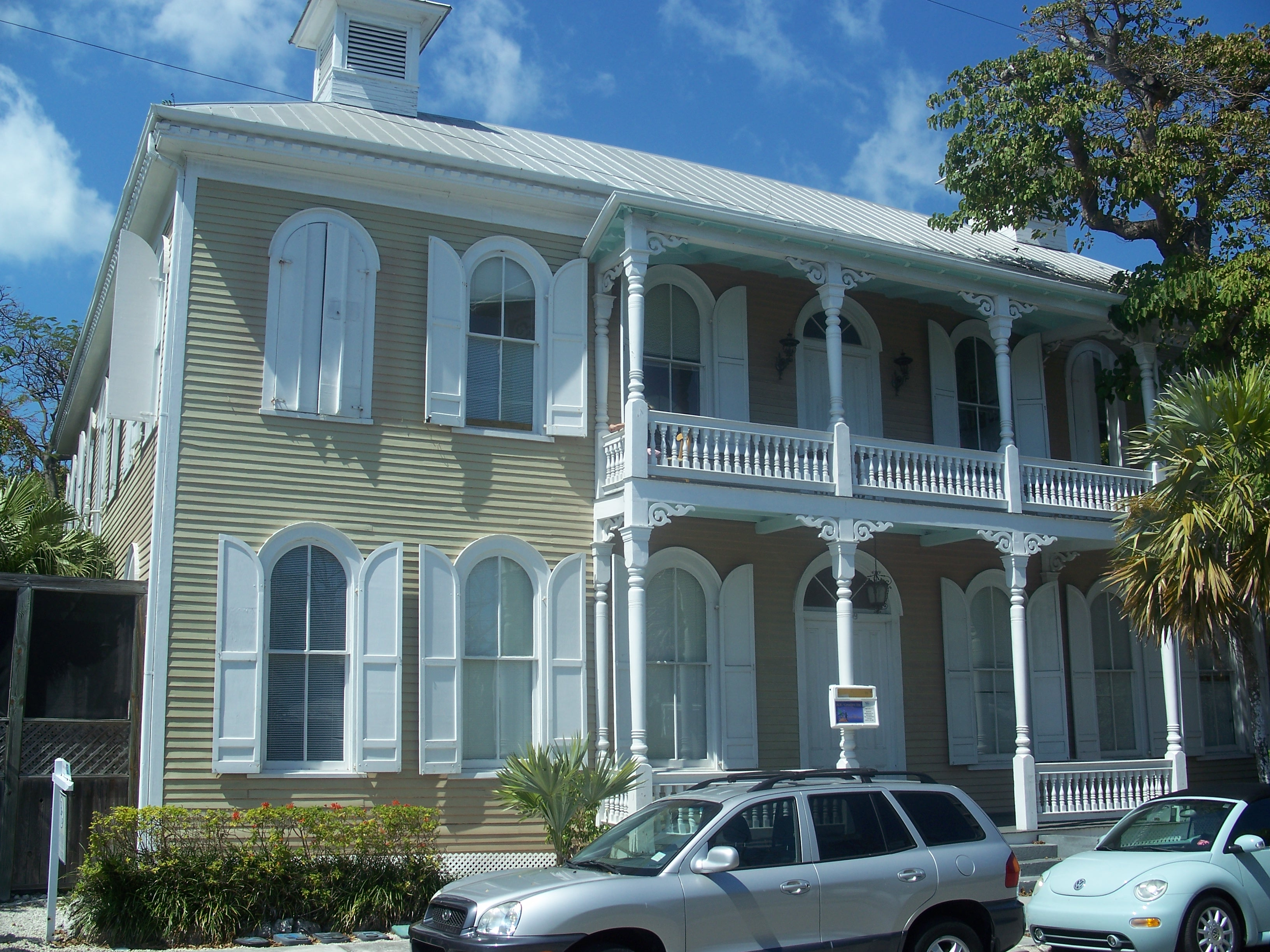
- Front of the Gato House

- Location within Florida Location within the United States
- Location: 1209 Virginia Street, Key West, Florida
- Coordinates: 24°33′19″N 81°47′25″W
- Architectural style: Mission/Spanish Revival
- NRHP reference No.: 73000586
- Added to NRHP: April 11, 1973

The Eduardo H. Gato House (also known as the Mercedes Hospital) is a historic home in Key West, Florida, United States. On April 11, 1973, it was added to the U.S. National Register of Historic Places Eduardo H. Gato and family also lived at 1327 Duval Street, also known as the southernmost Point Guest House.

It has also been known as Mercedes Hospital. A Cuban immigrant, Gato was a successful cigar merchant. The Victorian architecture wooden home with a Cuban style courtyard was documented as part of the Historic American Buildings Survey. Now a private residential apartment complex, the site includes a historical marker.
