= Isaac Allerton (shipwreck) =

Coordinates: 24.4331°N 81.6373°W

Isaac Allerton was a 594-ton American merchant ship that sank in a hurricane 15 nautical miles (28 km) east-southeast of Key West in the Florida Keys near the Saddlebunch Keys on August 28, 1856.

== History ==
Isaac Allerton was built in 1838 at Portsmouth, New Hampshire. She was 137 feet (42 m) long. Isaac Allerton carried cargoes throughout the Caribbean, Gulf of Mexico, and North Atlantic Ocean.

During a hurricane in 1856, she sank in Hawks Channel in 30 feet (9.1 meters) of water. Because she sank in such deep water, the Key West wreckers were unable to salvage all of her cargo, but the cargo they did salvage had a payoff of over US$50,000, making Isaac Allerton the richest wreck in Key West history.

In 1985, the wreck of Isaac Allerton was rediscovered by a group of local divers who had been searching for the celebrated Nuestra Señora de Atocha wreck.

Artifacts from Isaac Allerton are on display at the Key West Shipwreck Museum in Key West.
