= Key West Shipwreck Museum =

Museum in Florida, United States

Coordinates: 24.55908°N 81.806947°W

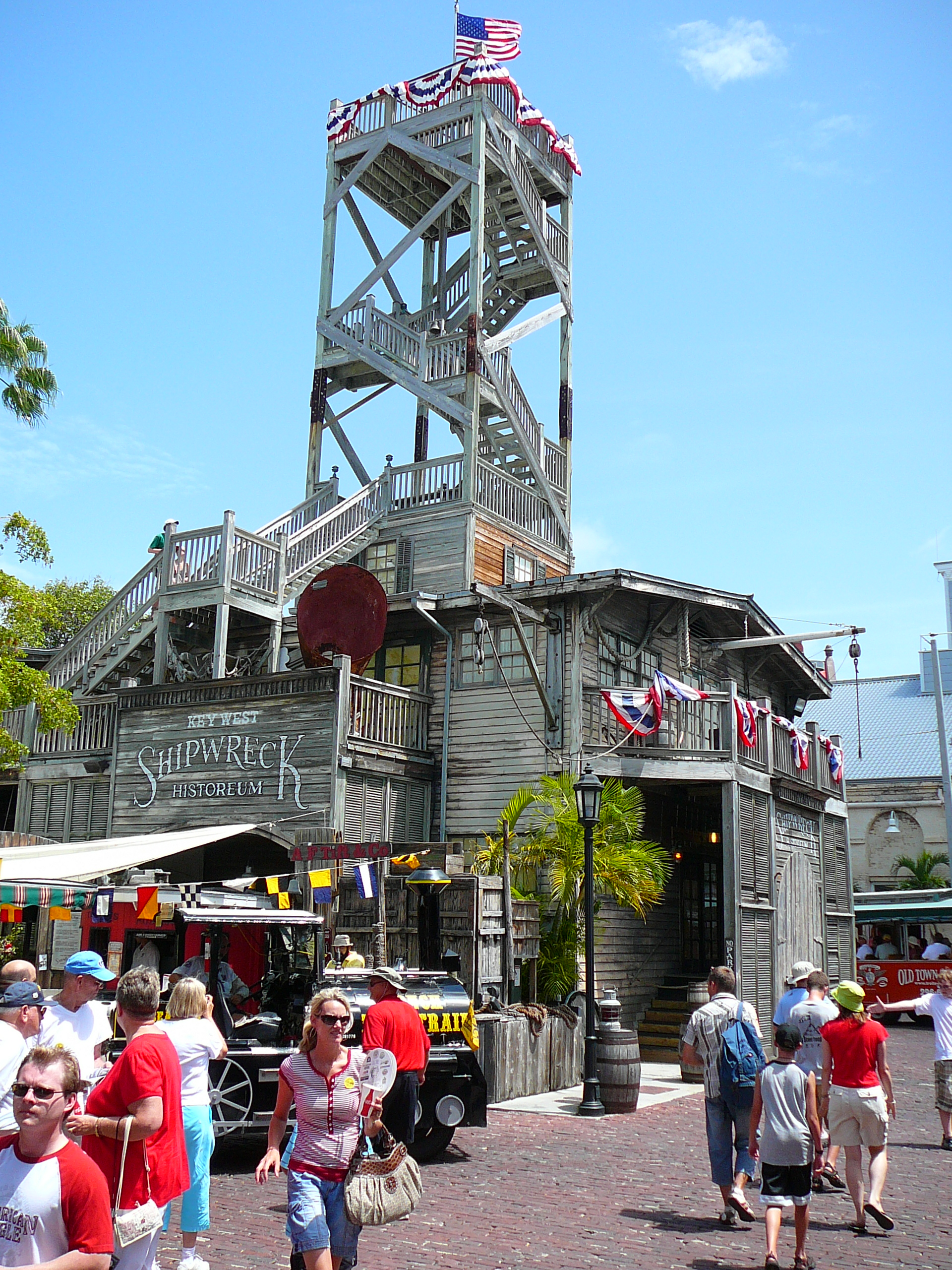
- Front entrance of the museum
- Location: 1 Whitehead Street; Key West, Florida
- Type: Shipwreck artifacts
- Website: Key West Shipwreck Museum

The Key West Shipwreck Museum (formerly Shipwreck Historeum) is located in Key West, Florida, United States. It combines actors, films and actual artifacts to tell the story of 400 years of shipwreck salvage in the Florida Keys. The museum itself is a re-creation of a 19th-century warehouse built by wrecker tycoon Asa Tift. Many of the artifacts on display are from the 1985 rediscovery of the wrecked vessel Isaac Allerton, which sank in 1856 on the Florida Keys reef and turned out to be one the richest shipwrecks in Key West's history, having resulted in the Federal Wrecking Court's largest monetary award for the salvage of a single vessel.

The museum guide portraying Tift tells the story from his point of view as he explains how this unusual industry provided for the livelihood for the entire island of Key West at a time when it had the largest population in the state.

Guests can climb the 65' lookout tower.

== Nuestra Senora de las Maravillas ==
Also included are relics from Spanish galleons, including a silver bar salvaged from the Nuestra Senora de las Maravillas that guests are encouraged to try to lift.

After 350 years, a team of marine archaeologists has found the treasure that was aboard the Spanish galleon Nuestra Señora de las Maravillas in 1656. Pendants, gold chains and other artifacts from the remains of the wreck, have been found along a trail of more than 9 miles. Among the jewels that have been found, there is a gold pendant with the cross of Santiago and others with symbols of the pilgrims of the Camino de Santiago.

== Gallery ==
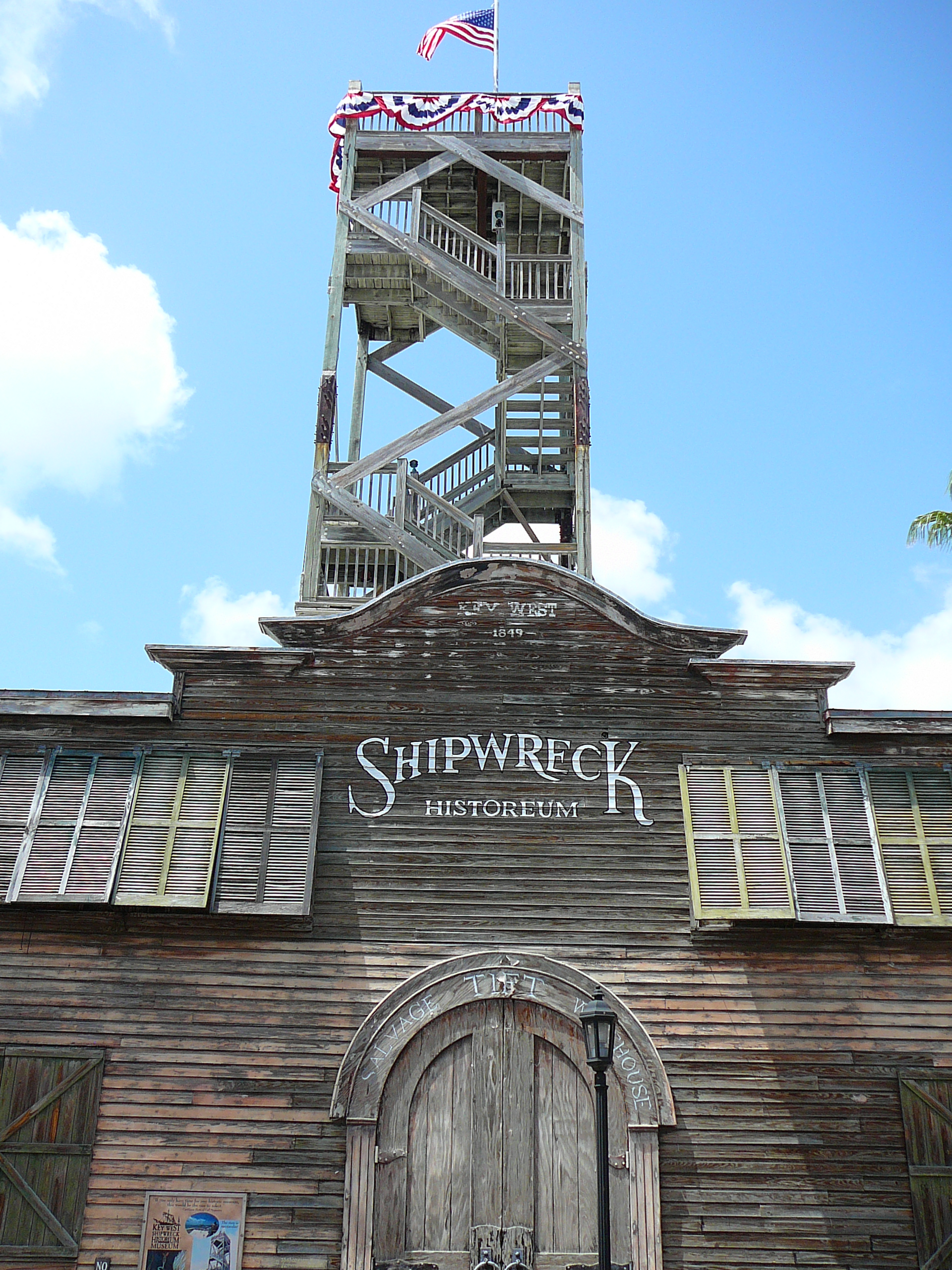
Back of the Museum

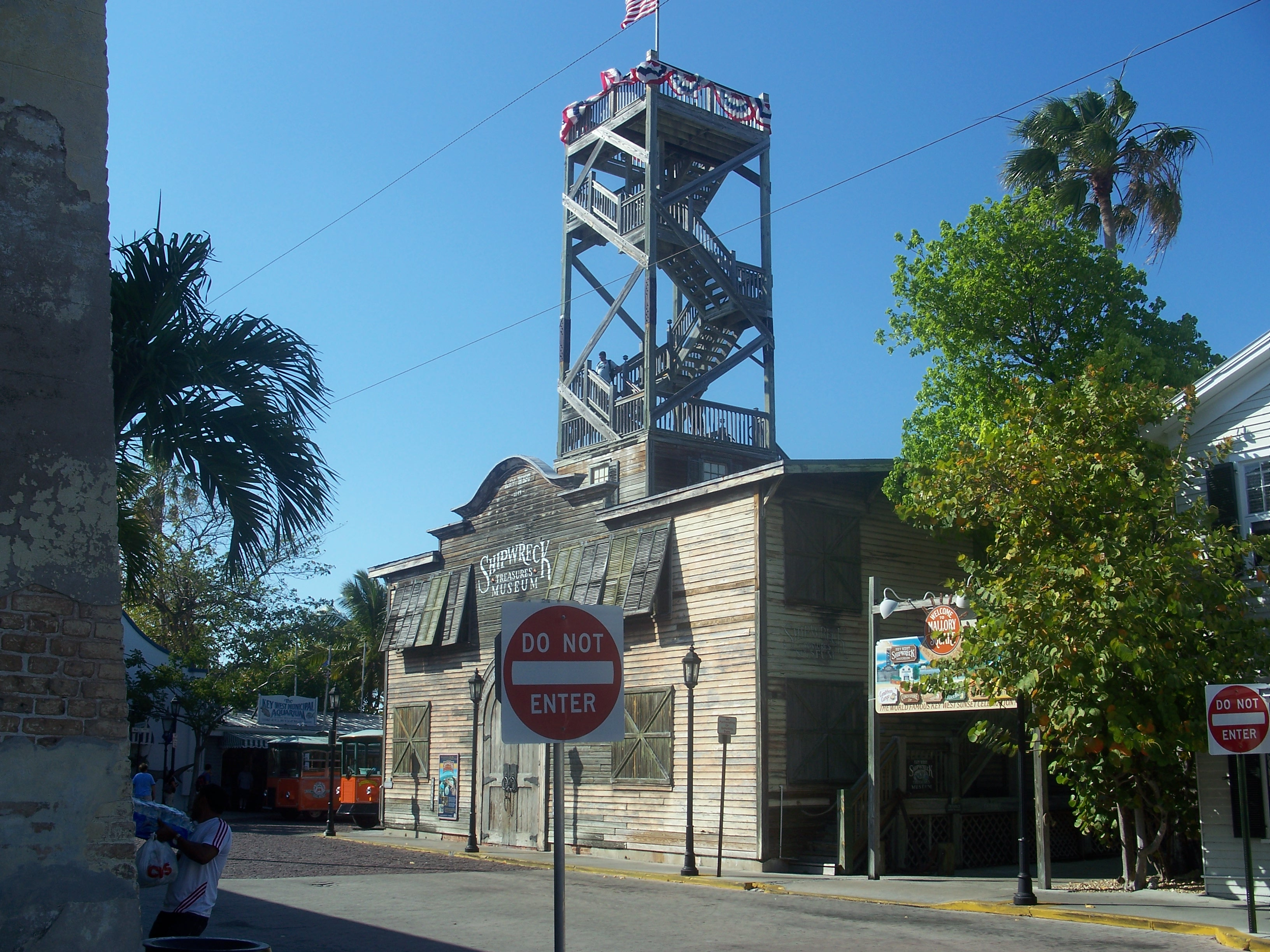
