= Polydactyl cat =

Cats with genetic anomaly that causes extra toes

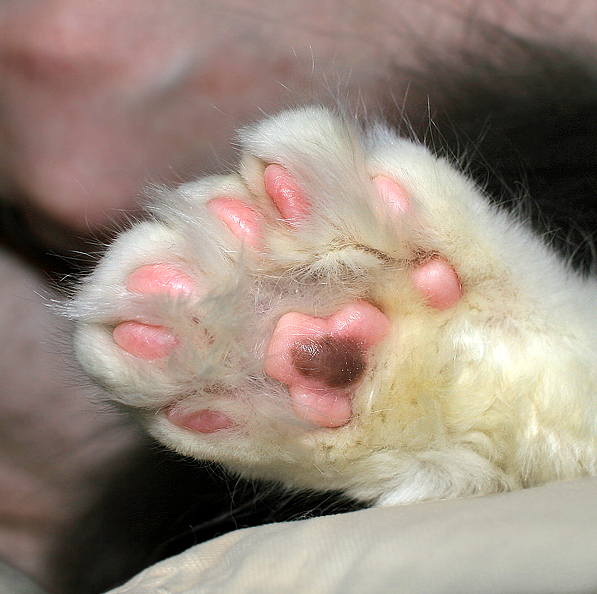
Left 7-toed rear paw of a female Maine Coon polydactyl kitten

A polydactyl cat is a cat with a congenital physical anomaly called feline polydactyly (also known as polydactylism or hyperdactyly), which causes the cat to be born with more than the usual number of toes on one or more of its paws.

A point mutation in the noncoding region of the ZRS regulatory sequence causes abnormal SHH expression during limb development, causing variable polydactyly through following developmental processes rather than the mutation alone, explaining why the phenotypic expression of polydactyly varies. Cats with this genetically inherited trait are most commonly found along the East Coast of North America (in the United States and Canada) and in South West England and Wales.

The breed, American polydactyl cats, are bred with normal-toed cats by breeders, since the trait is inherited dominantly and can be passed on to offspring reliably. These cats spread through maritime trade, notably from Boston, since sailors valued polydactyl cats and saw them as lucky. They became known as "Hemingway cats" after Ernest Hemingway's love for his own collection of polydactyl cats.

== Genetics ==
Preaxial polydactyly: Hw mutant in two right forefeet

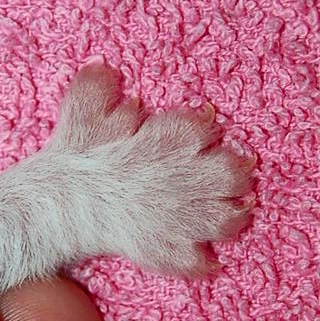
Maine Coon kitten

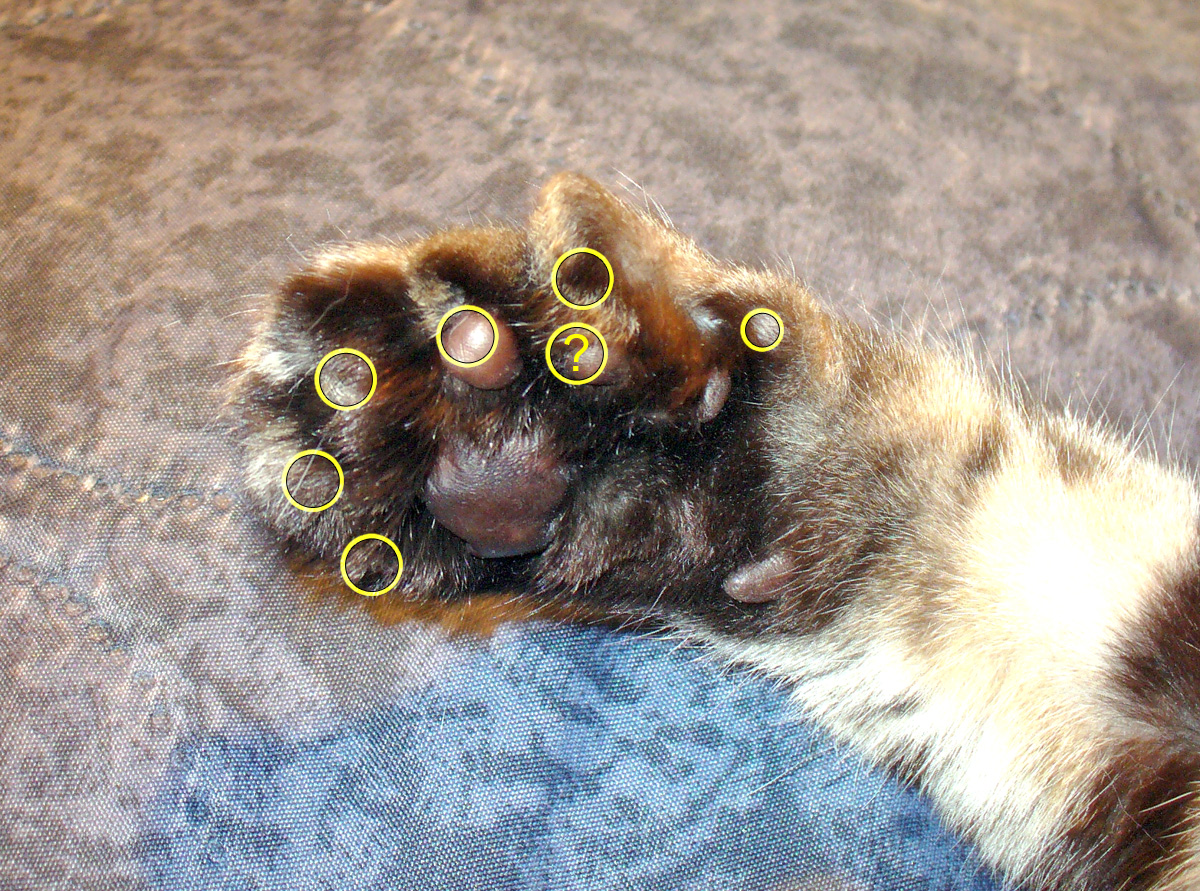
Cat's paw pad, edited to show seven yellow circles, indicating digits. The circle with a question mark indicates what might be a separate digit. The rightmost circle is for a small, underdeveloped, clawless digit.

Embryologists distinguish two principal forms of feline polydactyly: preaxial and postaxial. Preaxial polydactyly involves supernumerary digits on the medial (inner) side of the paw, corresponding to the thumb side in humans, whereas postaxial polydactyly affects the lateral (outer) side, corresponding to the little finger. Postaxial polydactyly is comparatively rare in cats, and the additional digits in such cases are often incompletely formed. By contrast, preaxial extra digits are typically well developed.

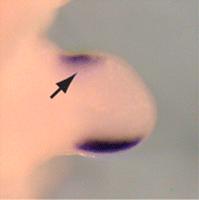
Polydactyly ectopic SHH expression at Hw mutant in a mouse

Polydactyly is a congenital malformation that is most commonly inherited in an autosomal dominant pattern. In several cases, the condition is associated with mutations affecting regulatory elements that control expression of the sonic hedgehog (SHH) gene during limb development. SHH encodes a signalling protein that plays a central role in embryonic pattern formation, including the specification and growth of limbs and digits.

Genetic work studying the DNA basis of the condition indicates that many different mutations in the same ZRS area can all lead to polydactyly. In the case of preaxial polydactyly of the Maine Coon cat (Hemingway mutant; Hw) a mutation of the cis-regulatory element ZRS (ZPA regulator sequence) is associated. ZRS is a noncoding element, 800 kilobase pairs (kb) remote to the target gene SHH. An ectopic expression of SHH is seen on the anterior side of the limb. Normally SHH is expressed in an organizer region, called the zone of polarising activity (ZPA) on the posterior limb side. From there it diffuses anteriorly, laterally to the growth direction of the limb. In the mutant mirroring smaller ectopic expression in a new organizer region is seen on the posterior side of the limb. This ectopic expression causes cell proliferation delivering the raw material for one or more new digits. An identical sequence at this position serves the same function in human and mice and cause similar symptoms when mutated. Different mutations have different specific effects: for example, while the Hw mutant tends to mostly induce extra fingers in the fore limbs, many other mutations affect the posterior limbs too.

Polydactyly is a spontaneous complex phenotypic variation, developed in one generation. In the concrete preaxial form of the Hw mutant the variation is induced by a single point mutation in a noncoding cis-regulatory element for SHH. In an extensive phenotypic variation like this, one or more complete digits at each single limb are developed including nerves, blood vessels, muscles and ligaments. The physiology of the digits can be perfect. This complex phenotypic result cannot be explained by the mutation alone. The mutation can only induce the variation. In the consequence of the mutation, thousands of events, each different from the wild type, occur on different organisation layers, such as expression changes of other genes, cell-cell signal exchange, cell differentiation, cell and tissue growth. The summarized small random changes on all layers build the raw material and the process steps for the generation of the plastic variation.

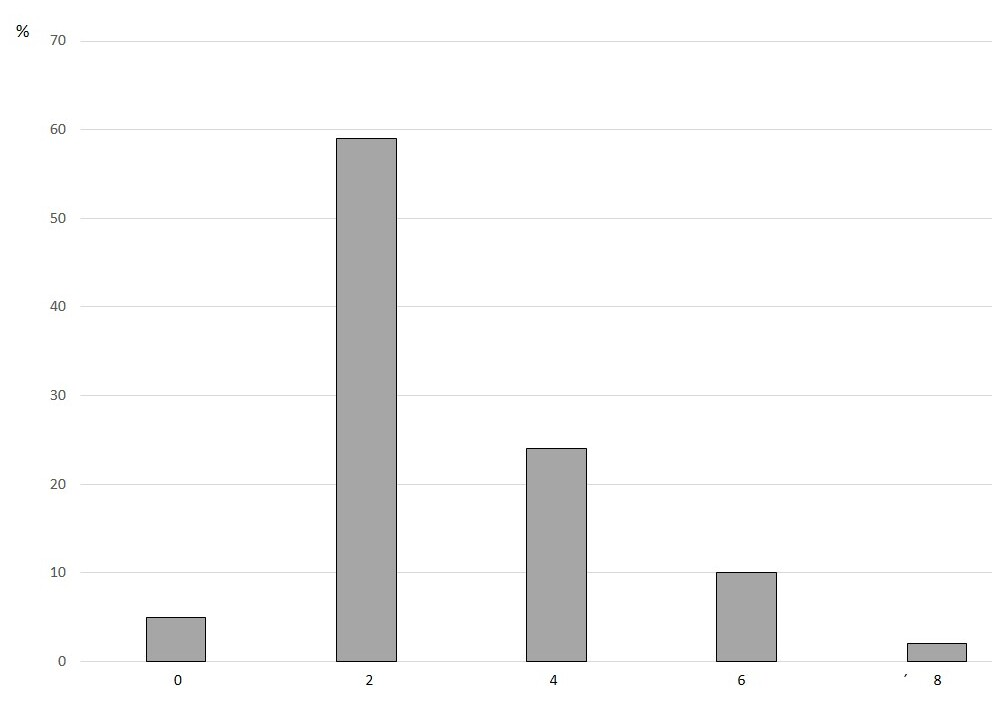
Preaxial polydactyly in a Maine Coon population - Hw mutant: frequency of extra polydactylous digits per individual

The mentioned form of polydactyly of the Hw mutant shows a biased variation. In a recent empirical study first the number of extra toes of 375 mutant Maine Coon cats were variable (polyphenism) and second, the number of extra toes followed a discontinuous statistical distribution. They were not equally distributed as one might expect of an identical single point mutation. The example demonstrates that the variation is not explained completely by the mutation alone.

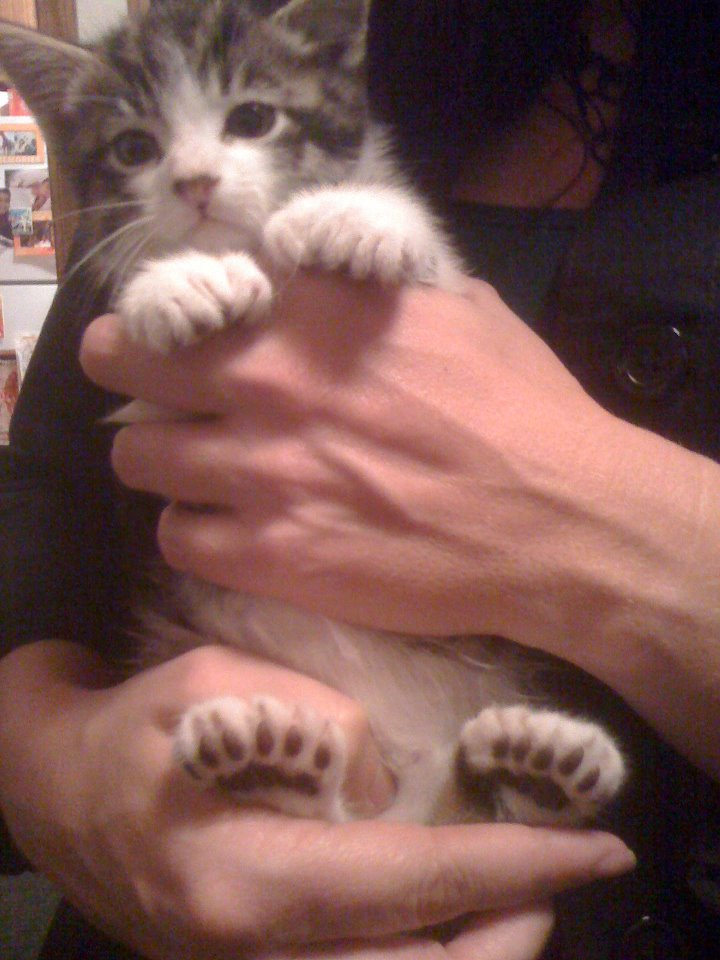
Male kitten with 23 toes

== Occurrence and heritability ==
Normal cats have a total of 18 toes, with five toes on each fore paw, and four toes on each hind paw; polydactyl cats may have as many as nine digits on their front or hind paws. Various combinations of anywhere from four to seven toes per paw are common. Polydactyly is most commonly found on the front paws only; it is rare for a cat to have polydactyl hind paws only, and polydactyly of all four paws is even less common. Polydactyly is a congenital abnormality that can be inherited in an autosomal dominant manner, meaning only one mutated gene needs to be passed on from the parent for the offspring to express the mutated phenotype. Below shows the probabilities of offspring inheriting polydactyly depending on the parent cats' genotypes (determined via a simple punnett square):

Affected (homozygous dominant) x Affected (homozygous dominant): 100%

Affected (homozygous dominant) x Not Affected (homozygous recessive): 100%

Affected (heterozygous) x Affected (heterozygous): 75%

Affected (heterozygous) x Not Affected (homozygous recessive): 50%

Not Affected (homozygous recessive) x Not Affected (homozygous recessive): 0%

Erebus, a polydactyl cat born in Wisconsin, USA, was recognized by Guinness World Records as having the highest number of toes on a cat at 29. The previous record holders since 2002 were Jake, a Canadian polydactyl cat, and Paws from the USA, both with 28. Various combinations of anywhere from four to seven toes per paw are common.

Polydactyly does not affect the lifespan of the cat, nor does it cause any health issues. One suggestion for caring for cats with polydactyly is to ensure that their nails are trimmed frequently so that their claws do not become overgrown and curl into their paws. It is also imperative to make sure that polydactyl cats, especially when they are young, do not get their claws stuck, since that can be more common for cats with extra toes.

== Breeding ==
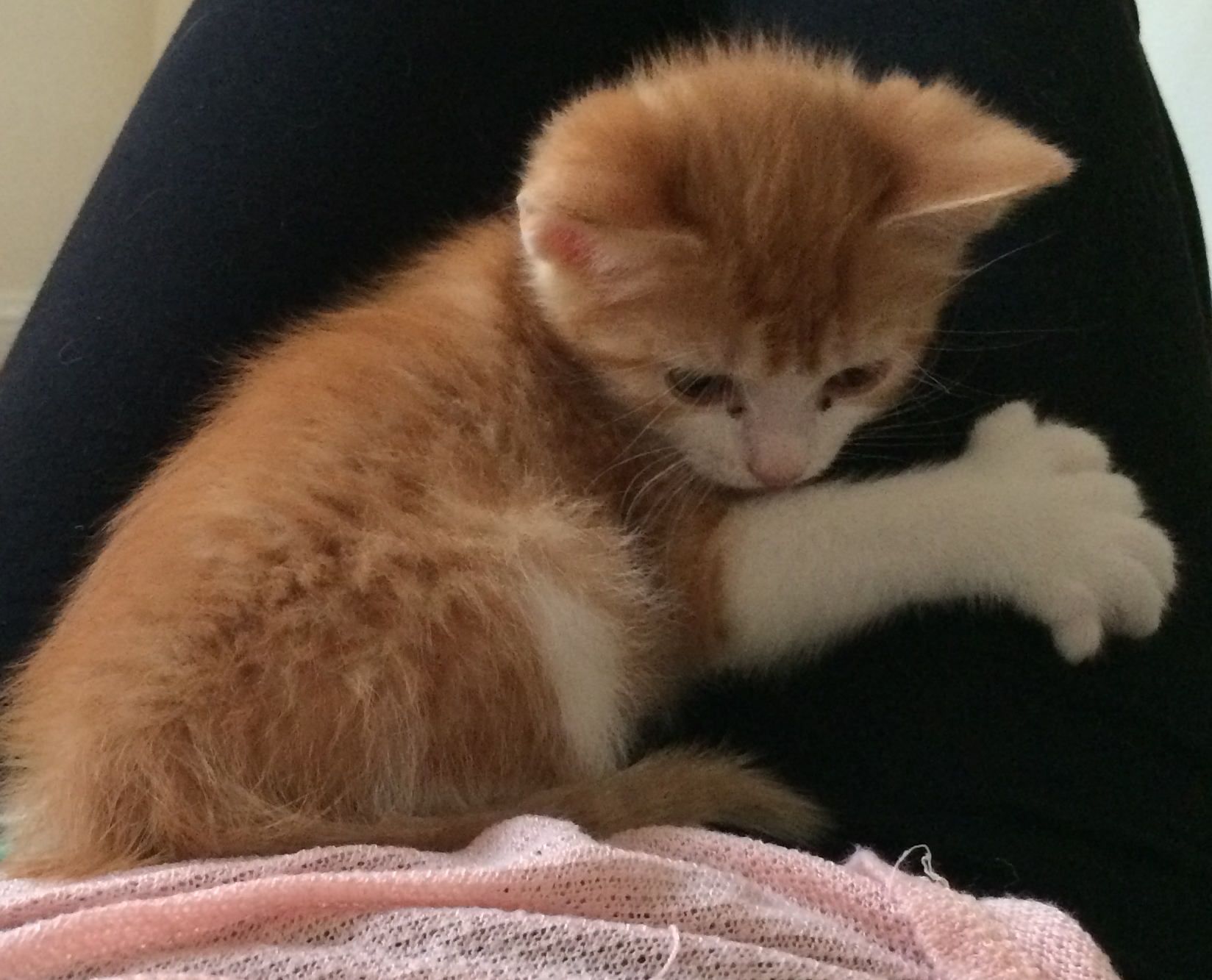
28-toed Maine Coon Polydactyl kitten (16 in front, 12 in back), showing its 8-toed front paw

Polydactylism is found in random-bred cat populations, and not an indication of purebred ancestry. Polydactylism is considered a disqualifying fault in most breeds, and makes kittens of any breeding line inadmissible for registration with some of the major cat registries. The registries argue that polydactylism is a congenital abnormality, which confers no welfare benefit upon cats, and in some cases the additional toes may be prone to injury; furthermore, claws on the extra toes may fail to wear down naturally, potentially causing harm to the animal. Due to these welfare concerns, polydactyl cats are barred from registry and showing in for example the FIFe, GCCF, CFA and WCF. This also holds true for oligodactylism (less toes) in some registries. The feature is permitted by some of the other major cat fancier clubs, for example with TICA; however only in specific cat breeds, including the Highlander, Maine Coon, and Pixie-bob. In TICA the polydactyl Maine Coons are categorised as a sister breed called the Maine Coon Polydactyl, and allowed polydactylism in their cats is limited to no more than 7 toes on any foot.

The American polydactyl is recognized as a cat breed with the Rare and Exotic Feline Registry, however not by any of the major registries. The cats are selectively bred in compliance with a breed standard in order to maintain a standardized breed with specific physical and behavioral characteristics, in addition to extra digits.

However, in non-pedigree breeding, polydactyly is commonly selected for because humans believe that the mutation is valuable aesthetically, meaning this is an example of artificial selection, though there is no significant advantage to the mutation. Breeders typically breed a polydactyl cat with a normal-toed cat since the trait is passed on dominantly and reliable to the offspring, meaning breeders can breed a litter of polydactyl kittens only requiring one polydactyl parent.

== History and naming ==
The condition seems to be most commonly found in cats along the East Coast of North America (in the United States and Canada) and in Western England and Wales. Polydactyl cats have been extremely popular as ship's cats in this region. Although there is some controversy over whether the most common variant of the trait originated in the US as a mutation in New England, or was brought there from Britain, there seems to be agreement that it spread widely as a result of cats carried on ships originating in Boston, and the prevalence of polydactyly among the cat population of various ports in North America correlates with the dates when they first established trade with Boston.

Contributing to the spread of polydactyl cats by this means, sailors in the region were long known to value polydactyl cats especially for their extraordinary climbing and hunting abilities as an aid in controlling shipboard rodents. Some sailors thought they bring good luck at sea. The rarity of polydactyl cats in Europe may be because they were hunted and killed based on superstitions about witchcraft.

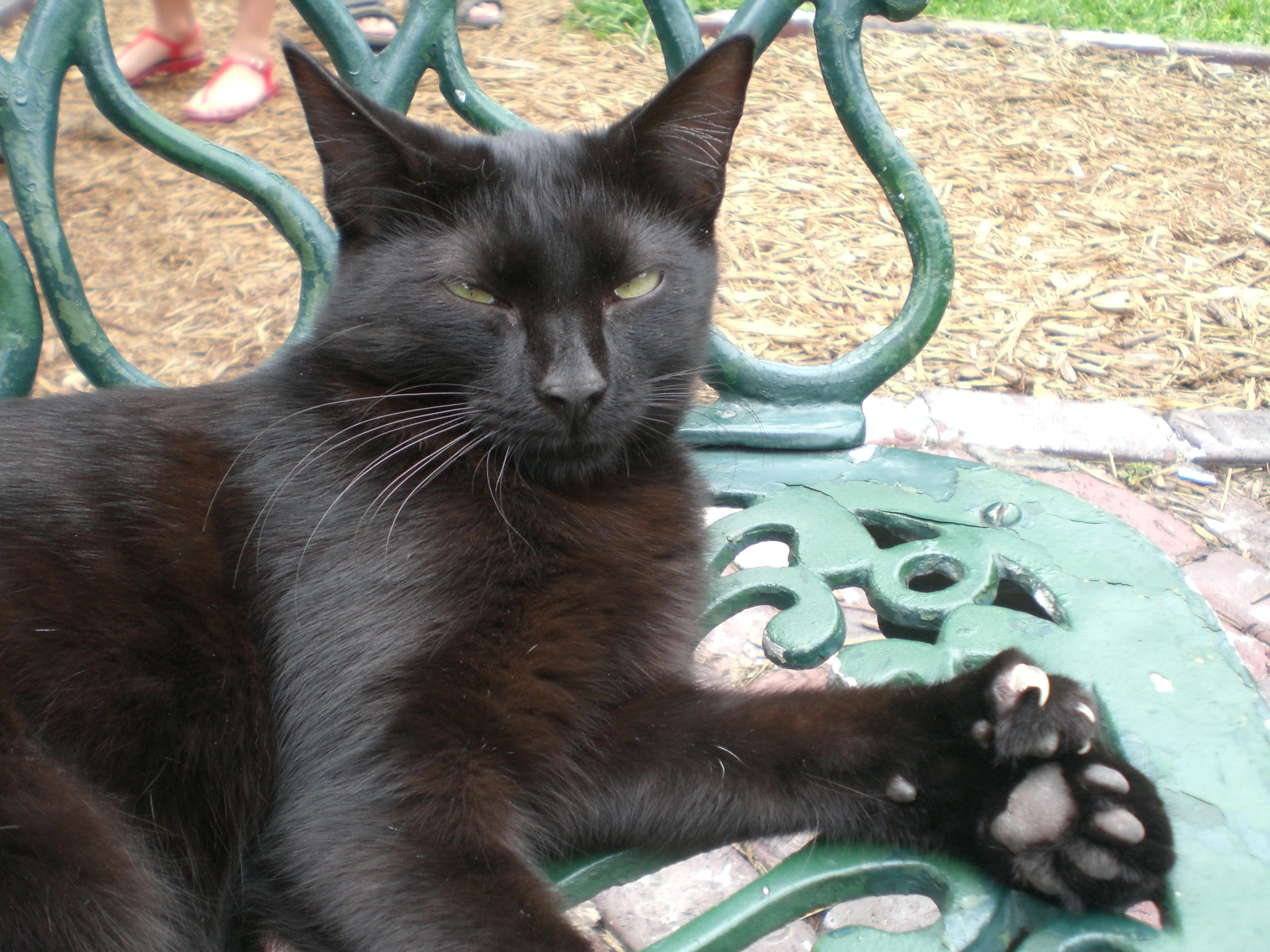
One of the polydactyl cats at the Ernest Hemingway House in Key West, Florida. This particular cat has seven (two extra) toes on each paw.

Author Ernest Hemingway became a famous aficionado of polydactyl cats after a ship captain gave him a six-toed cat that he named Snow White. Upon Hemingway's death in 1961, his former home in Key West, US, became a museum and a home for his cats, and it currently houses approximately 50 descendants of his cats (about half of which are polydactyl).

Hemingway is an important figure in the history of polydactyl cats because he brought light to the extra-toe mutation via his love for his own collection of polydactyl cats in his life, making them popular and giving them one of their commonly known nicknames (Hemingway cats). Other nicknames for polydactyl cats include mitten cats, conch cats, boxing cats, mitten-foot cats, snowshoe cats, boston-toed cats, "providence cats", thumb cats, six-fingered cats, and Cardi-cats.

== See also ==
- Polydactyly in early tetrapods
- Ship's cat
- List of cat body-type mutations

=== Notable polydactyl cats ===
- Lil Bub
- Paddles
