= Asa Tift =

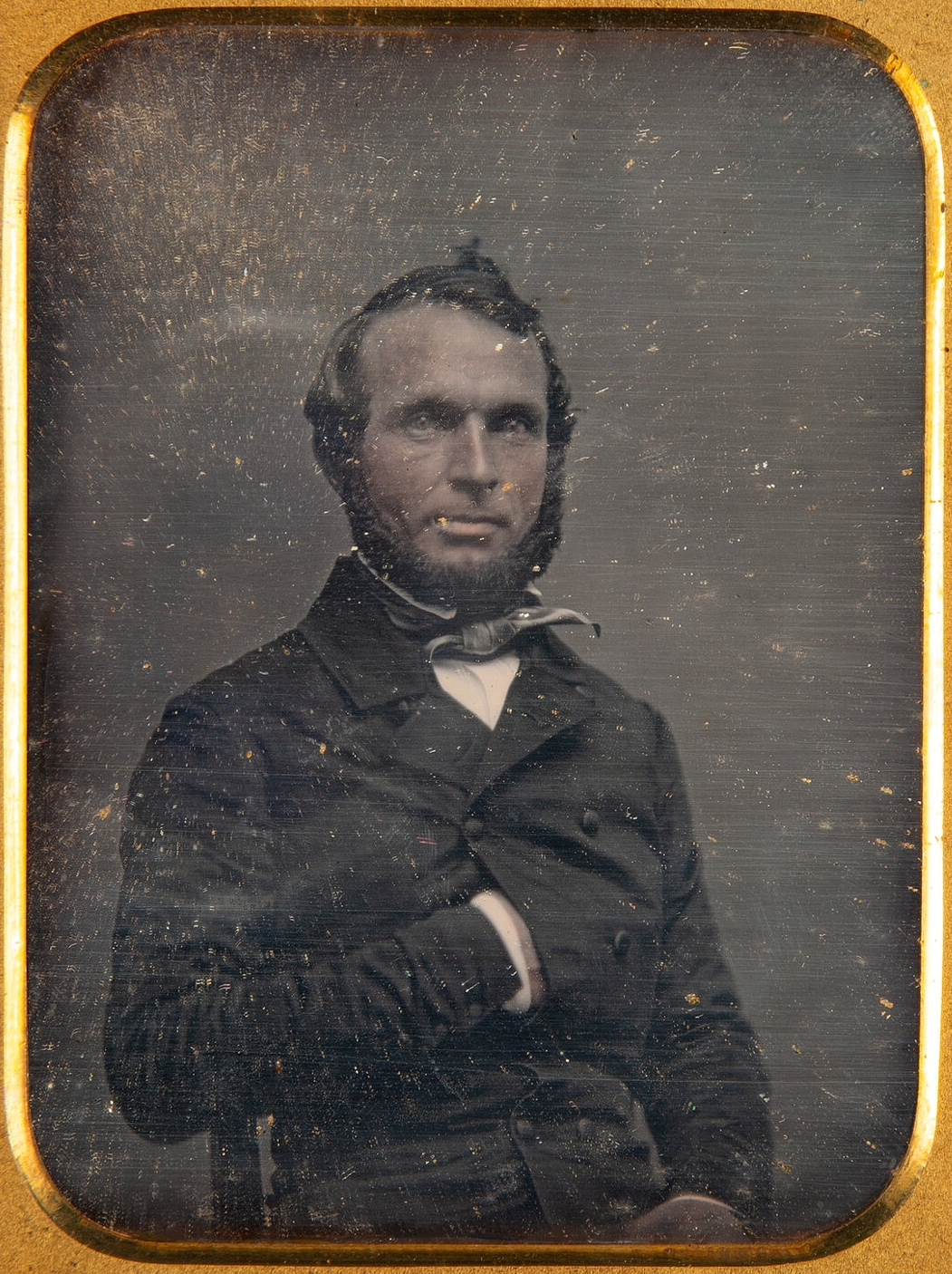
- Daguerreotype of Asa Tift, circa 1850s
- Born: March 28, 1812; Groton, New London County, Connecticut
- Died: February 7, 1889 (aged 76); Key West, Monroe County, Florida
- Occupation: Salvager

Asa Tift (March 28, 1812 – February 7, 1889) was the most notable salvager in Key West, Florida in the early 19th century. He owned a large salvaging operation, parts of which can still be seen as the Key West Shipwreck Museum (where tourists are shown around by an actor portraying Asa Tift). He was also responsible for the building of the Ernest Hemingway House in Key West. He was also the brother of Nelson Tift (founder of Albany, Georgia).

== Civil war ==
During the American Civil War, Asa and his brothers financed a ship to be built for the Confederates in Mobile, Alabama. After the North's victory at the Siege of Vicksburg, Nelson and Asa decided to blow up the ship rather than let it be captured by the Northern forces.

After refusing to fuel a Union ship, Tift was expelled from Key West. He later returned and died in 1889.
