= List of cat breeds =

Domestic cats have been diversified by humans into breeds and domestic and wild hybrids. Many such breeds are recognized by various cat registries. Additionally, there are new and experimental breeds, landraces being established as standardized breeds, distinct domestic populations not being actively developed and lapsed (extinct) breeds.

As of 2023, the International Cat Association (TICA) recognizes 75 standardized breeds, the Cat Fanciers' Association (CFA) recognizes 45, the Fédération Internationale Féline (FIFe) recognizes 50, the Governing Council of the Cat Fancy (GCCF) recognizes 45, and the World Cat Federation (WCF) recognizes 69.

Inconsistency in a breed's classification and naming among registries means that an individual animal may be considered different breeds by different registries (though not necessarily eligible for registry in them all, depending on its exact ancestry). For example, TICA's Himalayan is considered a colorpoint variety of the Persian by the CFA, while the Javanese, (or Colorpoint Longhair) is a color variation of the Balinese in both the TICA and the CFA; both breeds are merged (along with the Colorpoint Shorthair) into a single "mega-breed", the Colourpoint, by the World Cat Federation (WCF), who have repurposed the name "Javanese" for the Oriental Longhair. Also, "Colourpoint Longhair" refers to different breeds in other registries. There are many examples of nomenclatural overlap and differences of this sort. Furthermore, many geographical and cultural names for cat breeds are fanciful selections made by Western breeders to sound exotic and bear no relationship to the actual origin of the breeds; the Balinese, Javanese, and Himalayan are all examples of this trend.

The domestic short-haired and domestic long-haired cat types are not breeds, but terms used (with various spellings) in the cat fancy to describe random-bred, non-pedigree "moggy" or "household" cats by coat length, ones that do not belong to a particular breed. Some registries such as the Cat Fanciers' Association allow for domestic short hairs and domestic long hairs to be registered for the purpose of outcrossing. They should not be confused with standardized breeds with similar names, such as the British Shorthair and Oriental Longhair.

== Breeds ==
Breed	Image	Location of origin	Type	Body type	Coat type and length	Coat pattern
Abyssinian	Abyssinian	Unspecified, but somewhere in Afro-Asia, likely Ethiopia	Natural	Semi-foreign	Short	Ticked tabby
Aegean	Aegean	Greece	Natural	Moderate	Semi-long	Multi-color
American Bobtail	American Bobtail	United States	Mutation of shortened tail	Cobby	Semi-long	All
American Curl	American Curl	United States	Mutation	Semi-foreign	Semi-long	All
American Shorthair	American Shorthair	United States	Natural	Cobby	Short	All
American Wirehair	American Wirehair	United States	Mutation	Normal	Rex	All
Aphrodite's Giant (Note: Landrace were Aphrodite's Giant is selectively bred from is called Cyprus cat)	Cyprus	Cyprus	Natural	Lean and muscular	All	All
Arabian Mau	Arabian Mau	Arabian Peninsula	Natural	Moderate and muscular	Short	All
Asian	Asian	United Kingdom	Crossbreed between the Burmese and Chinchilla Persians	Moderate	Short	All without white and without siamese pointing
Australian Mist	Australian Mist	Australia	Crossbreed between the Abyssinian, Burmese, and Australian short-haired cats	Moderate	Short	Spotted or marbled
Balinese		Developed in United States; foundation stock from Thailand	Mutation of the Siamese	Semi-foreign	Long	Colorpoint
Bambino		United States	Crossbreed between the Munchkin and Sphynx	Dwarf	Short	Black + white hairless
Bengal		Developed in United States, but created in Asia	Hybrid of the Abyssinian and Egyptian Mau × leopard cat (Prionailurus bengalensis)	Large	Short	Spotted, marbled, or rosetted
Birman	Birman	Developed in France; foundation stock from Burma (Myanmar)	The original Birman was crossed with the Siamese and the Persian to create the Birman of today.	Cobby	Semi-long	Mitted colorpoint
Bombay	Bombay	United States and Burma (Myanmar)	Crossbreed between the Black American Shorthair and Sable Burmese	Cobby	Short	Solid black
Brazilian Shorthair	Brazilian Shorthair	Brazil	Natural	Normal	Short	All
British Longhair	British Semi-longhair	United Kingdom (England)	Natural	Cobby	Semi-long	All
British Shorthair	British Shorthair	United Kingdom (England)	Natural	Cobby	Short	All
Burmese	Burmese	Burma (Myanmar)	Natural	Semi-foreign or semi-cobby	Short	Solid and Tortoiseshell
Burmilla	Burmilla	United Kingdom (England)	Crossbreed between the Burmese and the Chinchilla Persian	Semi-cobby	Short	Solid with Shaded Silver and Silver Tipped patterns
California Spangled	California Spangled	United States	Crossbreed between the Abyssinian, American Shorthair and British Shorthair	Moderate	Short	Spotted tabby
Chantilly-Tiffany (extinct)	Chantilly-Tiffany	United States	Natural	Cobby	Long	Solid, classic tabby, spotted tabby and ticked tabby
Chartreux	Chartreux	France	Natural	Muscular; cobby	Short	Varying shades of blue
Chausie	Chausie	United States	Hybrid of the Abyssinian × jungle cat (Felis chaus)	Normal	Short	Solid black, black grizzled tabby and black ticked tabby
Colorpoint Shorthair	Colorpoint Shorthair	United Kingdom (England)	Crossbreed between the Abyssinian, Siamese and short-haired cats	Foreign	Short	Colorpoint
Cornish Rex	Cornish Rex	Cornwall, England, United Kingdom	Mutation	Foreign	Rex	All
Cymric, Manx Longhair or Long-haired Manx (Note: The Cymric is often classed as a long-haired variety of the Manx rather than a separate breed, e.g. as the "Semi-longhair Manx Variant" in GCCF.)	Cymric	Isle of Man, United States, and Canada (Note: There may be some dispute to the exact origins of the Cymric. The specific dominant autosomal gene (M) that causes the short tail of the Cymric was found in the cats living on the Isle of Man in the Irish Sea; however, the breed itself was developed by a Canadian breeder named Blair Wright and an American breeder named Leslie Falteisek in the 1960s from the Isle of Man population.)	Mutation of the Manx (shortened tail)	Semi-cobby	Long	All
Devon Rex	Devon Rex	Buckfastleigh, Devon, England, United Kingdom	Mutation	Semi-foreign	Rex	All
Donskoy or Don Sphynx	Donskoy or Don Sphynx	Russia	Mutation	Semi-foreign	Hairless	Solid
Dragon Li or Chinese Li Hua		China	Natural	Normal	Short	Ticked tabby
Dwelf		United States	Crossbreed between the American Curl, Munchkin and Sphynx	Dwarf	Hairless	All
Egyptian Mau	Egyptian Mau	Egypt	Natural	Moderate and muscular	Short	Spotted tabby
European Shorthair	European Shorthair	Continental Europe	Natural	Moderate	Short	All
Exotic Shorthair	Exotic Shorthair	United States	Crossbreed between the American Shorthair and Persian	Cobby	Short	All
Foldex	Foldex	Canada	Crossbreed between the Exotic Shorthair and Scottish Fold	Cobby	Short	All
Foreign White		United Kingdom	Natural	Normal	Short	White
German Rex	German Rex	Germany	Mutation	Semi-foreign	Rex	All
Havana Brown	Havana Brown	United Kingdom (England); foundation stock from Thailand	Crossbreed between the Siamese and black short-haired cats	Semi-foreign	Short	Solid brown
Highlander	Highlander	United States	Crossbreed between the Desert Lynx and Jungle Curl	Moderate	Short/long	All
Himalayan (Colourpoint Persian) (Note: Some registries, such as CFA and TICA, classify the Himalayan as a colorpoint variety of the Persian. Others classify it as a long-haired sub-breed of the Siamese. WCF has combined the Himalayan, the Colorpoint Shorthair and the Javanese/Colorpoint Longhair into a single breed, the Colourpoint.)	Himalayan or Colorpoint Persian	United States and United Kingdom	Crossbreed between the Persian and Siamese	Cobby	Long	Colorpoint
Jianzhou cat	Jianzhou cat	China	Natural	Normal	Short	Multi-color
Japanese Bobtail	Japanese Bobtail	Japan (Note: Due to artifacts and prints dating from as early as the 11th century found in many Eastern countries, there is some likelihood these cats may have originated in China, then were brought to Japan. However, the first known importation of Japanese Bobtails was from Japan in the 1960s.)	Mutation of shortened tail	Moderate	Short/long	All
Javanese or Colorpoint Longhair (Note: "Colorpoint Longhair" has multiple meanings and "Javanese" has been used for at least one other breed; WCF uses the "Javanese" name for the Oriental Longhair (not colorpointed). WCF has also merged the colorpointed Javanese/Colorpoint Longhair, the Himalayan and the Colorpoint Shorthair of other registries into a single breed, the Colourpoint. In CFA and TICA, and some other registries, the Javanese/Colorpoint Longhair has been merged back into the Balinese as a breed division.)	Javanese or Colorpoint Longhair	Developed in United States and Canada; foundation stock from Southeast Asia	Crossbreed between the Balinese (with some Colorpoint Shorthair), Oriental Longhair and Siamese	Oriental	Long	Colorpoint (excluding solid black, blue, chocolate, and lilac)
Kanaani	Javanese or Colorpoint Longhair	Israel	Hybrid of domestic short-haired cats × African wildcat (Felis lybica)	Semi-foreign	Short	Black, chocolate or cinnamon in spotted or blotched tabby
Karelian Bobtail	Karelian Bobtail	Ladoga Karelia, Russia	Natural, mutation of shortened tail	Medium	Short/long	All Western (Note: All Western means all colours, except chocolate, lilac, cinnamon, and fawn, and the colourpoint pattern)
Khao Manee	Khao Manee	Thailand	Natural	Moderate	Short	Solid white
Kinkalow	Kinkalow	United States	Crossbreed between the Munchkin and American Curl	Dwarf	Short	All
Korat	Korat	Thailand	Natural	Semi-foreign or semi-cobby and muscular	Short	Solid blue
Korean Bobtail		Korea	Natural, mutation of shortened tail	Moderate	Short/long	All
Korn Ja or Konja		Thailand	Natural	Small	Short	Solid black
Kurilian Bobtail	Kurilian Bobtail Longhair	Kuril Islands, Russia	Natural, mutation of shortened tail	Medium	Short/long	All Western
Lambkin		United States	Crossbreed between the Munchkin and Selkirk Rex	Dwarf	Rex	All
LaPerm	LaPerm	United States	Mutation	Moderate	Rex	All
Lykoi	Lykoi	United States	Mutation	Moderate	Sparse haired	Black roan
Maine Coon	Maine Coon	United States	Natural, crossbreed	Large	Semi-long/long	All Western
Manx	Manx	Isle of Man	Mutation of shortened tail	Moderate	Short/long	All
Mekong Bobtail	Mekong Bobtail	Developed in Russia; foundation stock ultimately from Southeast Asia	Mutation of shortened tail	Moderate	Short	Colorpoint
Minskin	Minskin	United States	Crossbreed between the Munchkin, Burmese, Devon Rex, and Sphynx	Dwarf	Hairless	All
Minuet	Minuet	United States	Crossbreed between the Persian and Munchkin	Dwarf	Short/long	All
Munchkin	Munchkin	United States	Mutation of dwarf cat	Dwarf	Short/long	All
Nebelung	Nebelung	United States	Natural, mutation	Foreign	Semi-long	Solid blue
Neva Masquerade (colorpoint Siberian) (Note: The Neva Masquerade is classified as a separate breed in several (inter)national registries, such as FIFe. However, other registries classify the Neva Masquerade as a natural colorpoint variety of the Siberian cat.)	Neva Masquerade	Russia	Crossbreed between the Siberian and a colorpoint cat	Cobby	Long	Colorpoint
Norwegian Forest cat	Norwegian Forest Cat	Norway	Natural	Cobby	Long	All Western
Ocicat	Ocicat	United States	Crossbreed between the Abyssinian, American Shorthair and Siamese	Large	Short	Spotted tabby
Ojos Azules (extinct)	Ojos Azules	United States	Crossbreed	Moderate	Short	All
Oriental Bicolour (Note: In some registries, including the CFA, the Oriental Shorthair and Oriental Longhair are a single breed, the Oriental, with two divisions (shorthair and longhair).)	Oriental Bicolor	Developed in United States and United Kingdom, later in Continental Europe; foundation stock ultimately from Thailand	Color variety of the Oriental Shorthair	Oriental	Short	Bicolor
Oriental Longhair	Oriental Longhair	Developed in United States and United Kingdom; foundation stock ultimately from Thailand	Crossbreed between the Oriental Shorthair and long-haired cats	Oriental	Semi-long	All; if colorpoint is considered to be a separate breed, it is called the Javanese
Oriental Shorthair	Oriental Shorthair	Developed in United States and United Kingdom; foundation stock ultimately from Thailand	Crossbreed between the European Shorthair and Siamese	Oriental	Short	All
Persian (modern)	Persian, modern	Developed in United States and Europe; foundation stock from Greater Iran	Mutation of the Traditional Persian	Cobby	Long	All but colorpoint
Persian _{(traditional)}	Traditional Persian	Greater Iran	Natural, but some crossbreeding with the Turkish Angora	Cobby	Long	All but colorpoint
Peterbald	Peterbald	Russia	Crossbreed between the Donskoy, Oriental Shorthair and Siamese; before this, it was between the Balinese and Javanese	Oriental	Hairless, velour, brush, or straight coat	All
Pixie-bob	Pixie-bob	United States	Mutation (falsely claimed to be a hybrid of the domestic cat and the bobcat (Lynx rufus) early on)	Medium	Short	Black spotted tabby
Ragamuffin (Note: Or Liebling (obsolete terminology).)	Ragamuffin	United States	Crossbreed between the Ragdoll with limited out-crossing to the Himalayan, the Persian, and other long-haired cats	Cobby	Long	All
Ragdoll	Ragdoll	United States	Behavioral mutation in a crossbreed, presumed to be between the Persian or Turkish Angora and the Birman or Burmese	Cobby	Long	Colorpoint, mitted, or bicolor
Raas	Raas	Raas Island, Indonesia	Natural	Moderate	Short	Solid black, blue, chocolate, lilac
Russian Blue	Russian Blue	Russia	Natural	Moderate, Oriental	Short	Solid blue
Russian White, Russian Black and Russian Tabby	Russian Blue	Developed in Australia; foundation stock from Russia	Crossbreeds between the Russian Blue and short-haired cats from Siberia, Russia	Moderate	Short	Solid white, solid black and tabby
Sam Sawet	Russian Blue	Thailand	Color variety of the Thai	Moderate	Short	Solid
Savannah	Savannah	United States	Hybrid of the domestic cat x serval (Leptailurus serval)	Large	Short	Spotted
Scottish Fold	Lilac-coated Scottish Fold	United Kingdom (Scotland)	Mutation of the bones and cartilage of the ears	Cobby	Short/long	All
Selkirk Rex	Selkirk Rex	United States in 1988	Mutation/crossbreed between the American Shorthair, Persian, Himalayan, Exotic Shorthair and British Shorthair	Large and cobby	Short/long (semi-long to long)	All
Serengeti	Serengeti	United States	Crossbreed/hybrid between the Bengal and Oriental Shorthair	Oriental	Short	Spotted
Siamese (modern))	Siamese	Developed in United States and Europe; foundation stock from Thailand	Mutation of the Thai	Oriental	Short	Colorpoint
Siberian or Siberian Forest Cat)	Siberian	Siberian Tundra, Russia.	Natural	Cobby	Long	All Western
Singapura	Singapura	Developed in United States; foundation stock from Singapore	Possibly a mutation of a crossbreed (excluding the Munchkin), solving why they are so small	Small	Short	Ticked tabby
Snowshoe	Snowshoe	United States	Crossbreed between the American Shorthair and Siamese	Moderate	Short	Mitted colorpoint
Sokoke	Sokoke	Kenya	Natural	Moderate	Short	Ticked tabby
Somali	Somali	United States, Canada	Mutation	Cobby	Long	Ticked tabby
Sphynx	Sphynx	Canada, Europe	Mutation	Oriental	Hairless	All
Suphalak	Suphalak	Thailand	Natural	Moderate	Short	Solid reddish-brown
Thai (Note: Thai is an established new name since the 1980s for the traditional, rounder-faced, thicker-bodied Siamese. Wichienmaat is the name of the landrace it is bred from.) (Traditional, Classic, Old-style)	Thai	Developed in Europe; foundation stock from Thailand	Natural	Moderate	Short	Colorpoint
Thai Lilac, Thai Blue Point and Thai Lilac Point	Thai Lilac	Thailand	Color varieties of the Korat	Moderate	Short	Solid lilac and colorpoint (blue point and lilac point only)
Tiffanie (Asian Semi-longhair)	Asian Semi-longhair	United Kingdom	Crossbreed between the Burmese and Chinchilla Persians	Moderate	Semi-long	All without white and without siamese pointing
Tonkinese	Tonkinese	Canada, United States	Crossbreed between the Burmese and Siamese	Oriental	Short	Colorpoint, mink, or solid
Toybob	Thai Lilac	Russia	Mutation	Dwarf	Short	All
Toyger	Toyger	United States	Crossbreed/hybrid between the Bengal and short-haired cats	Moderate	Short	Mackerel tabby
Turkish Angora	Turkish Angora	Turkey	Natural	Semi-cobby	Semi-long	All
Turkish Van (Note: The Turkish Van breed, and especially its "Turkish Vankedisi" nickname, are often confused with the Van cat (Van kedisi in Turkish), a landrace (not breed) of cats native to the Lake Van region of Turkey. The Turkish Van has no known connection to cats from this region, but they are often confused due to the name similarity and incorrect claims sometimes made by breeders.)	Turkish Van	Developed in United Kingdom; foundation stock from Turkey	Natural	Semi-cobby	Semi-long	Van pattern
Van cat (not recognised)	Van cat	foundation stock from Lake Van region, Turkey	Natural	Svelte	Long	Solid white
Ukrainian Levkoy	Ukrainian Levkoy	Ukraine	Crossbreed between the Donskoy and Scottish Fold	Moderate	Hairless	Solid gray
York Chocolate		New York, United States	Natural	Moderate	Long	Solid chocolate and solid lilac or any of these colours with white

== See also ==
- Animal show
- Animals in sport
- Felidae – the entire cat family
- Felinae – the subfamily of all smaller cat species
- Lists of breeds
- List of experimental cat breeds
- List of cat registries
- List of individual cats
- Selective breeding
- Wildcat – the ancestor of the domestic cat
