= Shorthair =

Shorthair may refer to:

- American Shorthair (ASH), a breed of cat believed to be descended from English domestic cats
- Brazilian Shorthair, breed of cat
- British Shorthair, domesticated cat whose features make it a popular breed in cat shows
- Brown Shorthair Goat, from the Czech Republic, from crossing a native Czech breed with the German Brown Goat
- Colorpoint Shorthair, pointed cats of Siamese ancestry and type in colors other than the four "traditional" Siamese colors
- Domestic short-haired cat, cat of mixed ancestry—thus not belonging to any particular recognized cat breed—possessing a coat of short fur
- European Shorthair (or Celtic shorthair), breed of short-haired cat originating in Ancient Rome
- Exotic Shorthair, breed of cat developed to be a shorthaired version of the Persian
- Oriental Shorthair, breed of cat combinining the Siamese body with a diversity of colorings and patterns

== See also ==
- Southern British Shorthair Cat Club, established in 1992 to represent British Shorthair Cats at all levels within the Cat Fancy
