= Ukrainian Levkoy =

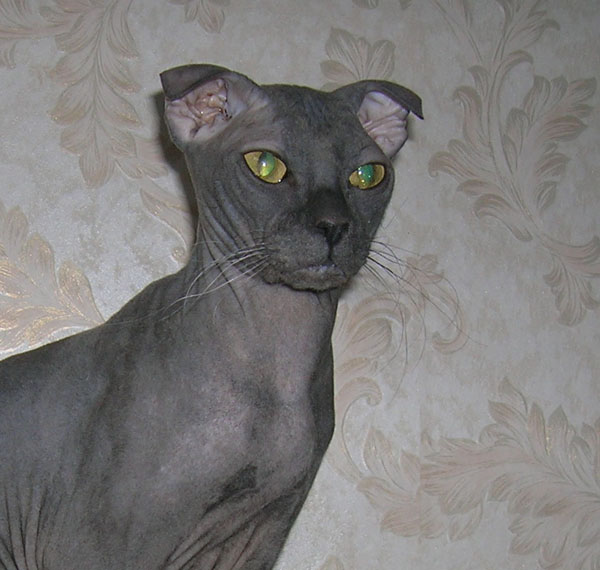
- Origin: Ukraine

The Ukrainian Levkoy; (Ukrainian: Український левкой, romanized: Ukraiins'kyi levkoi) a cross between the Scottish Fold and Donskoy cat, is a cat breed with inward-folding ears and little to no hair. The cats are of medium size with a longish body, appearing both muscular and slender. They have soft, elastic skin; an excess of which leads to a wrinkled appearance.

The Levkoy's peculiar features are: special angular contour of its head and "stepped" profile (dog-face appearance), folded ears and large, but not wide almond-shaped eyes. The cats express sexual dimorphism.

== Development and appearance ==
From the top view the head of a Ukrainian Levkoy resembles a soft outlined pentagon that is a little longer than it is broad, where the muzzle length is only 1/3 the length of the head. The forehead is rather low and the skull is long and flat. Prominent cheekbones and eyebrows form angular outlines of the head. The profile of the cat head is "stepped" of two levels. The upper lines of the nose bridge and of the head are almost parallel. The whiskers are curly, may be shortly snapped, and then the neck is of medium length, muscular, and slightly arches from the shoulder to the base of the skull.

White coloured adult

Its body is medium to long, muscular, and slender. The back line slightly arched with a broad, oval chest. Its legs are rather long with long mobile toes. The ears are large and set high and wide apart. 1/2 to 1/3 of each ear is roundly folded forward and down, without touching the head. (Note: When breeding according to the breeding guide, one of the parents must have normal straight ears. The other parent must have folded ears since their genotype has the dominant FD gene in its heterozygous form too. All straight eared kittens do not have any dominant FD gene. The straight variety of the Ukrainian Levkoy is the complemented and necessary partner of the breed. (See similar trait characteristics in the Scottish Fold))

== Defects and disqualification ==
The FD gene is responsible for folded ears in cats. It is inherited in an autosomal dominant manner, with homozygous FD/FD cats often resulting in extreme exostosis in the legs causing lameness, and other more severe struggles with osteochondrodysplasia. Heterozygous FD/fd cats may still struggle with similar bone defects & other issues, just to a less extreme degree.

Common reasons for disqualification includes birth defects, such as crossed eyes. Or, lack of accordance with the show rules. For example, too short or round of a head, round eyes, a short "cobby" body, weak chin, or aggressive behavior.

== Litter ==
The average litter size is generally three to five kittens.

Approximately half of the kittens in each litter will have folded ears, while the remaining kittens will be straight-eared.
