= Jianzhou cat =

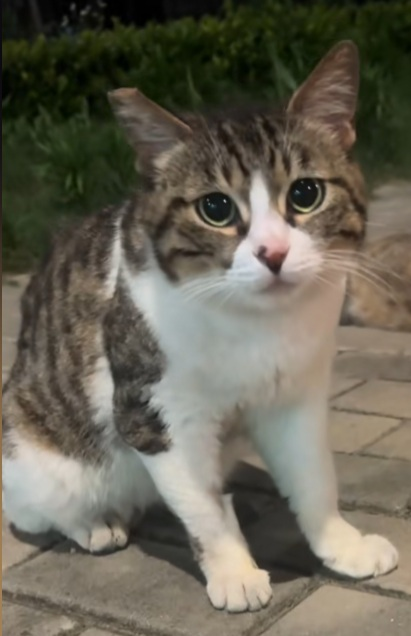
- Jianzhou cat who has already accepted TNR
- Other names: Shen Mao(神貓); Si-Er Mao(四耳貓); Nia Mao(丫猫); Chinese Jianzhou Mao(中國簡州貓)
- Common nicknames: Sichuan Jianzhou cat(四川簡州貓)
- Origin: China

Jianzhou cat (Chinese: 簡州貓, jiǎn zhōu māo), also known as Shen Mao(神貓), Si-Er Mao(四耳貓), Sichuan Jianzhou cat(四川簡州貓), is a local cat breed in Jianyang City, Sichuan Province, China., the locals call them Nia Mao(丫猫).

== Background ==
The Jianzhou cat originated from Jianzhou (簡州) in China, which is now Jianyang City, Sichuan Province, China, and is a local cat breed. It is very popular in local rural areas and is raised by farmers for rat hunting.

Historically, Jianzhou cat have become a popular cat breed in China during the Tang dynasty. During the Ming and Qing dynasties, the Jianzhou cat was even selected as a local tribute in Sichuan and presented to the emperor. Soon after, the Jianzhou cat became one of the royal pets at that time. After becoming a royal pet, some nobles, officials and aristocratic families began to raise Jianzhou cats in order to imitate the royal family. Jianzhou cats also became one of the gifts given to each other by the upper class during exchanges and became a fashionable pet in the upper class.

The breed is not recognized internationally by any pedigreed cat organizations.

== Description ==
The Jianzhou cats is tall and sturdy, with well-developed muscles but not bulk. Its coat color is varied and mixed, rarely showing a single solid color, and lacks distinct markings. The ears overlap and may be attached. There is a distinct gap in the ear outline, and a mid-point inflection point, giving the appearance of having two extra ears.

Jianzhou cats have a keen sense of hearing, capable of hearing frequencies up to 60,000 hertz, and can detect the footsteps of a mouse 20 meters away. Jianzhou cats are loyal to their owners and only allow them to approach, as others approaching them may cause accidental injury. To maintain their health, Jianzhou cats regularly eat cat grass and supplement with folic acid to promote growth and development.
