= Traditional Persian =

Breed of cat

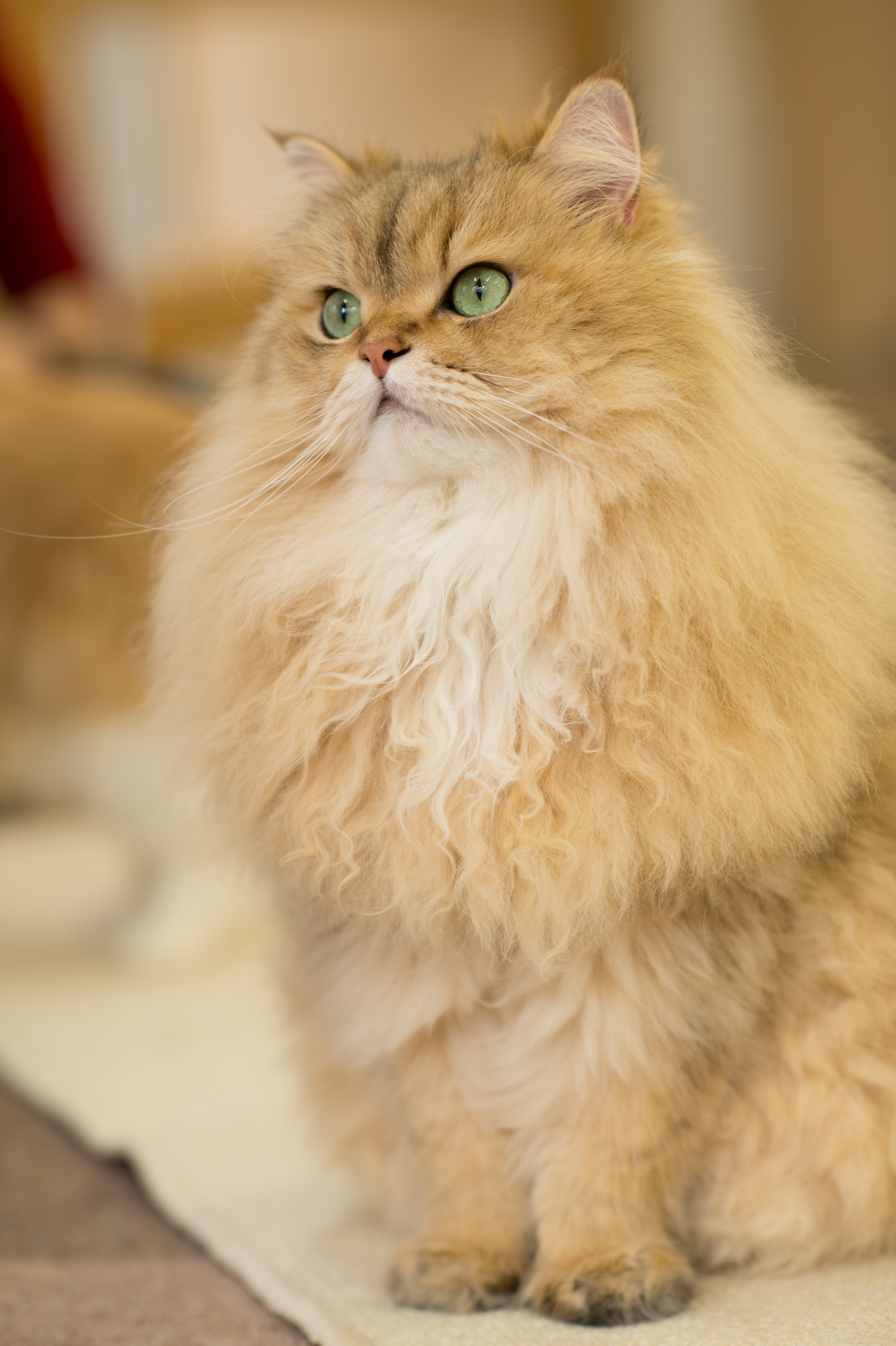
- Black golden Chinchilla tabby male Traditional Persian
- Other names: Longhair; Persian Longhair; Classic Persian; Doll-face Persian
- Origin: Iran

Breed standards
- WCF: standard
- SACC: standard

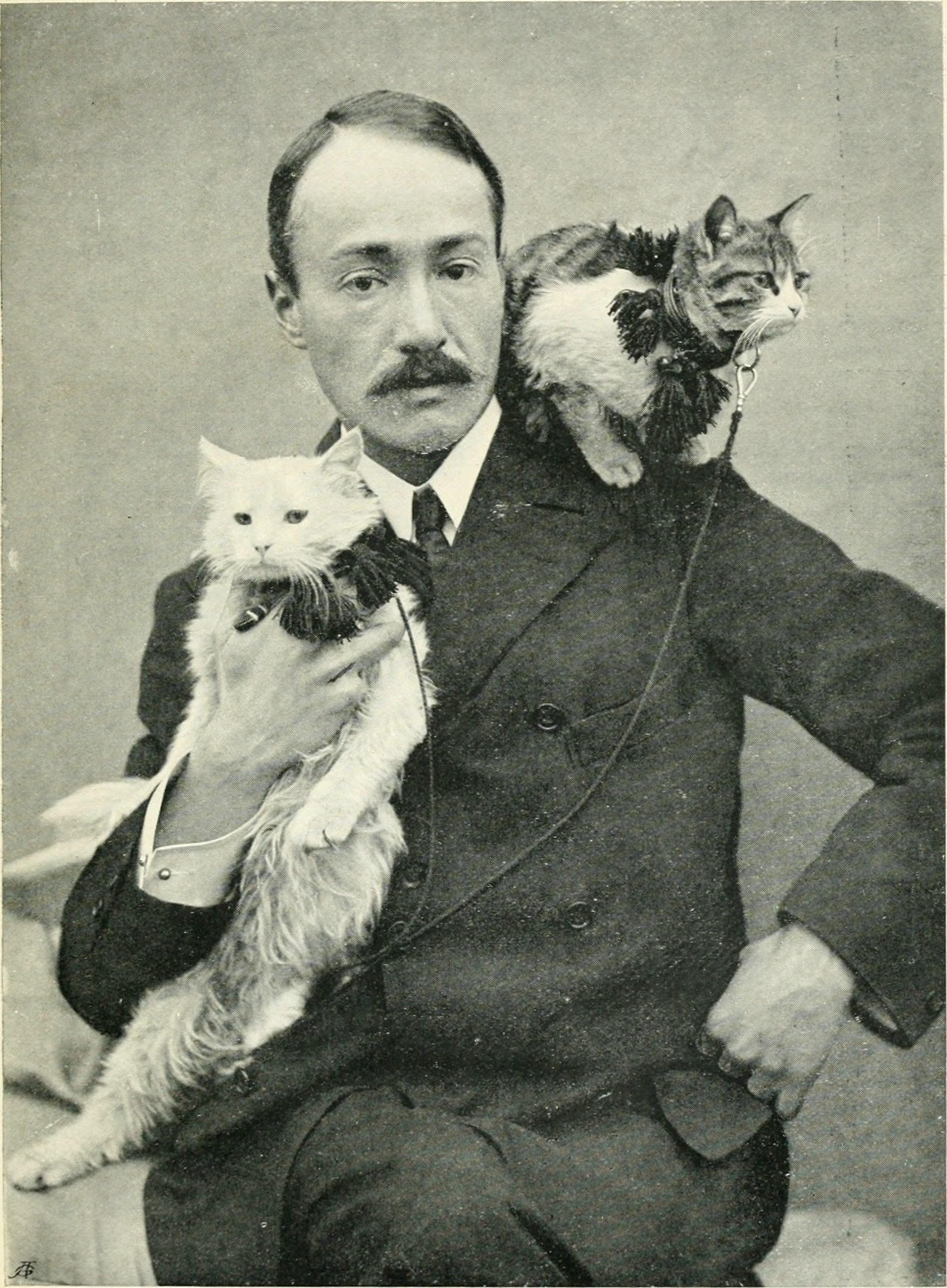
Arnold Henry Savage Landor with his two Persian kittens, which he purchased himself in Kerman, Iran (also known as Persia) around 1900

Traditional Persian is one of several names for a group of cats that are considered to be essentially the original breed of Persian cat, before the variety was selectively bred to have extreme features. Other everyday usage names are: Doll Face Persian, Classic Persian, Old Fashioned Persian, Long-nosed Persian, Old-style Longhair, Traditional Longhair and Original Longhair.

The physical appearance of this domestic cat breed barely changed when compared to photos dating back to the late 1800s. However, since some breeders in the United States and other parts of the world introduced the brachycephalic mutation into the breed, the short nose and clear break became shorter and higher. This resulted in the modification of the original Persian breed standard so that modern show quality Persians must have pushed-in faces. This resulted in the breed disappearing from cat shows.

However, this older form of Persian cat was made iconic to the general public through its use in popular films, even as it was being phased out in the cat fancy. For example, the Traditional Persian has been featured in eight of the James Bond movies, beginning with "From Russia with Love" in 1963. It was also featured in the kung fu cult classic Enter the Dragon.

== Origin ==
Persian cats originate from Persia (Iran). The cats were introduced in Europe in the 1500s as highly valued items of trade. The Europeans were impressed by the Persian's long, silky coat and purposefully bred the cats to perpetuate the trait.

== Genetic mutations in Persians ==
Two mutations of note influenced the Persian cats: the color inhibitor gene (1882) that gave rise to the so-called "chinchilla" coat and the brachycephalic mutation (circa 1942) that gave rise to the so-called "peke-faced" or "snub-nosed" Persian cats.

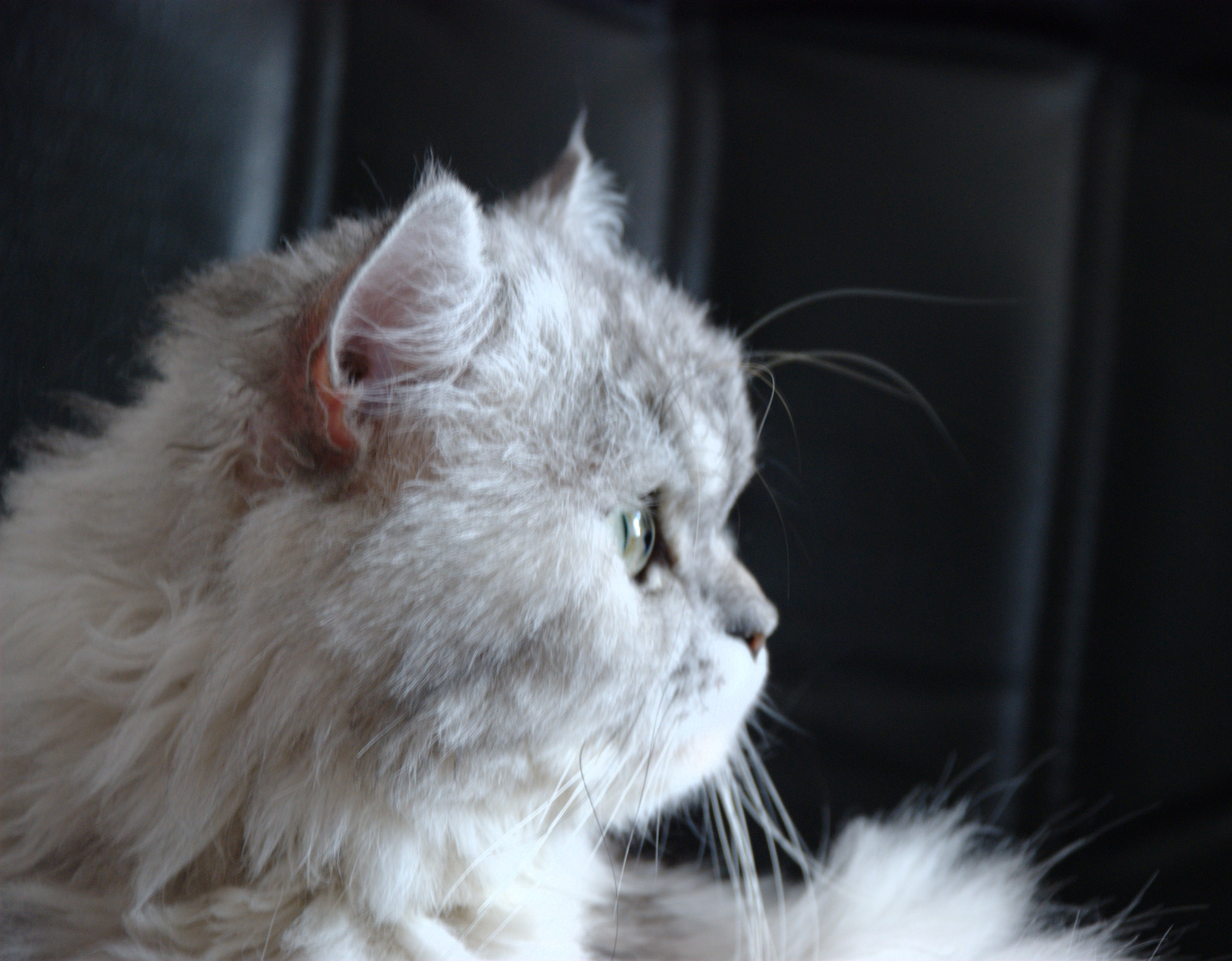
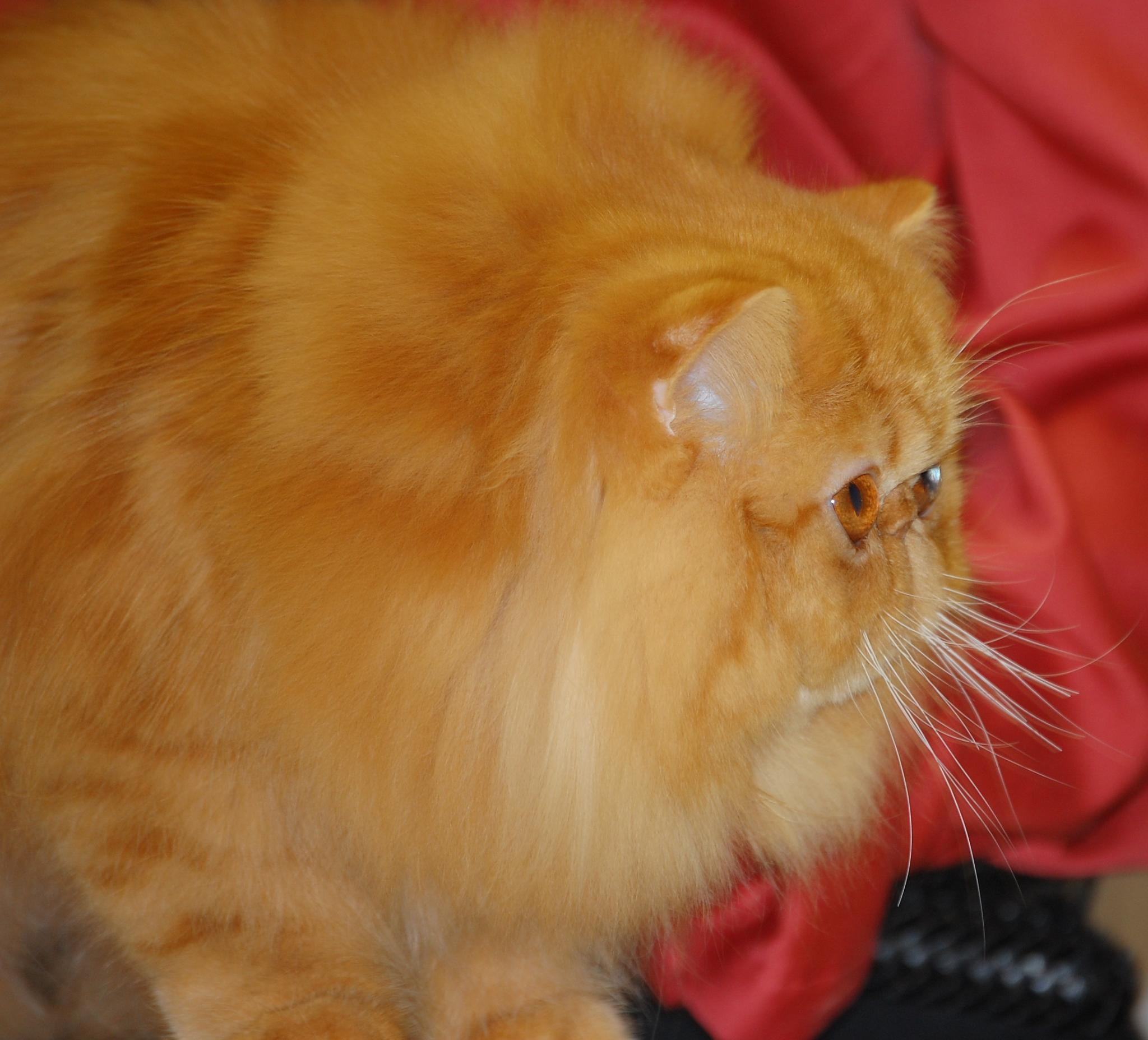
A Traditional Persian (left) with a visible muzzle in contrast with a Modern Persian (right) with its forehead, nose and chin in vertical alignment, as called for by CFA's 2007 breed standard. The shorter the muzzle, the higher the nose tends to be. UK standards penalize Persians whose nose leather extends above the bottom edge of the eye.

=== Brachycephalic mutation ===
The brachycephalic mutation in the Persian breed occurred during World War II in the US. This led to a concerted effort to breed Persians with rounder heads and smaller ears than their ancient ancestors after World War II. The resultant brachycephalic heads lead to the much desired snub noses favored by many modern Persian breeders and which dictates the modern standard for Persians in cat fancies throughout the world.

=== Chinchilla color mutation ===
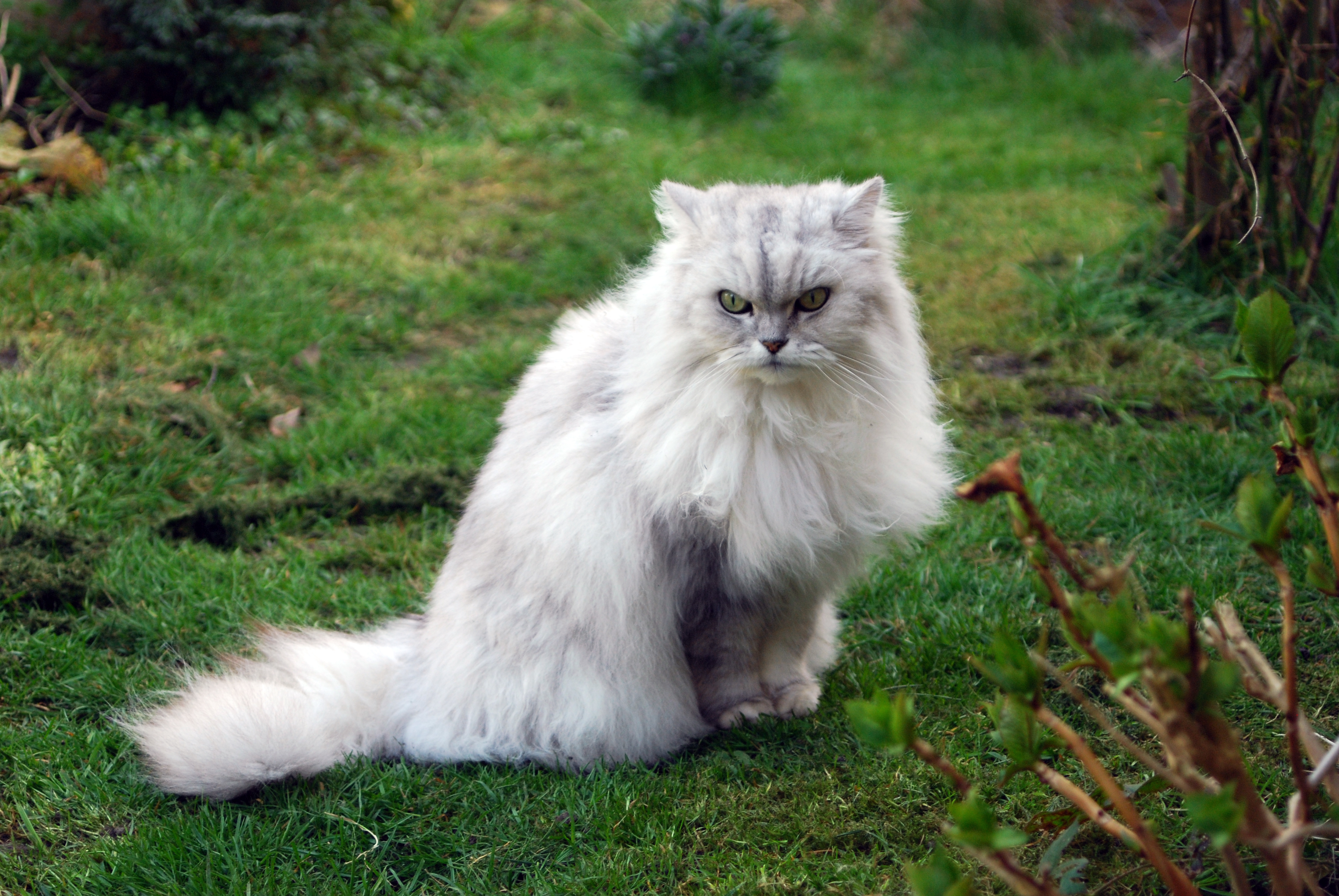
Black silver Chinchilla Persian

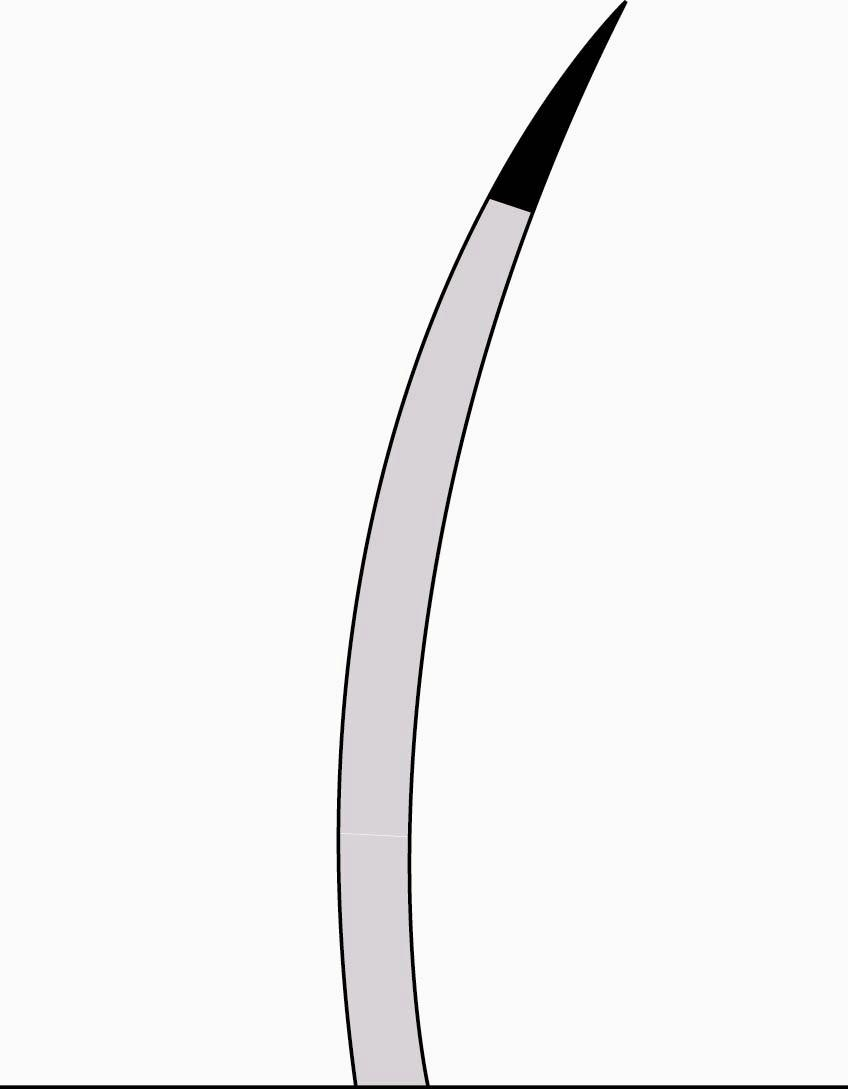
Chinchilla (tipped)

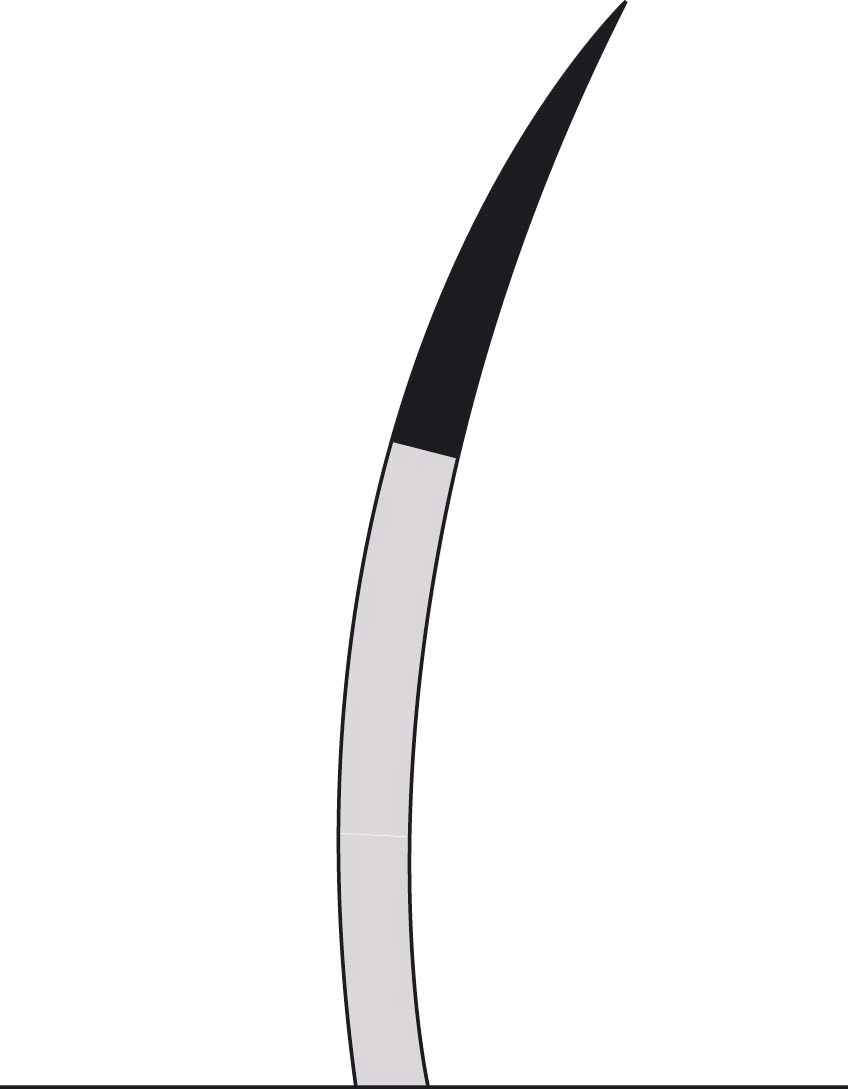
Shaded

The color inhibitor gene mutated in a Persian cross in 1882 in the UK in a cat called "Chinnie". The offspring of this mutation that express the gene are commonly known as "chinchillas" presumably due to the resemblance of their coat to that of the rodent by that name. They were classified as a Persian variety for breeding purposes.

The chinchilla comes in both the silver and golden series, with black silver chinchilla as the most common. Chinchilla cats are almost pure white Persian cats with a sprinkling of darker colored tipping (shell) that gives them a sparkling metallic appearance. The chinchilla should have only a tiny amount of darker colored tipping on their face and legs. Only the hair tips are darker pigmented (approx. 1/8 of the hair length), and chinchillas are significantly lighter in overall color compared to Persians with shaded coats (approx. 1/3 of the hair length is darker pigmented).

=== Color breeding in chinchilla varieties ===
The sub-set of chinchilla varieties experienced problems during the brachycephalic modernization phase with regards to the original chinchilla coloring features. These included loss or incomplete lip- and nose liners; patched-colored paw pads and eye color faults. Once lost, it is hard, if not impossible, to recover.

By the mid-1950s, concerned breeders of chinchilla in the US advocated pure color breeding. A key person in this regard was Jeanne Ramsdale, author of the book "Persian Cats and Other Longhairs".

== Breed recognition history up till 2010 ==
Despite the non-conformance to the modern Persian breed standards, some breeders, and in particular those that practiced controlled color-breeding, continued to breed and register their original longhair cats.

The following attempts were made to restore the original longhairs as breed in their own right, namely:

1. Sterling in the International Cat Cat Association (TICA) (Feb 1994 - Sep 1995), and continued in the International Cat Exhibitors (ICE) in 1998;
2. Chinchilla Longhair in the South African Cat Council (SACC) in 1996;
3. Traditional Longhair (silver and golden) in the World Cat Federation (WCF) in 2010.

=== Sterling standard ===
There is some confusion around the name "Sterling". In the International Cat Association (TICA), there were some American Shorthair breeders who bred to Persians to obtain their silver color and green eyes. The kittens were attractive but did not meet the true American Shorthair type. Jane Martinke noticed the effect the outcrosses had on the American type and coat as well as the attractiveness of the kittens. She proposed a new breed, called the "Sterling" because of their silver color. These new cats were bred to look like Persians but with a short, dense plush coat. The name was changed to "Exotic Shorthair" when all colors were accepted in 1979.

In September 1992 the "English Sterling" as a New Breed was presented by Jeanne Johnson at the TICA 13th Annual Meeting. Follow-up work resulted in the breed with the name "Sterling" (without 'English' in front) was accepted as Category 1 in TICA in Feb 1994. (Category 1 in TICA means "Established Breeds".) The Sterling had Category 1 status only for 18 months, before it was scrapped in total by TICA in September 1995. The assumed reason is that there was a lack of buy-in from enough fellow breeders as required by TICA breed recognition rules. Despite this set-back, Jeannie Johnson continued by getting the "Sterling" accepted by the International Cat Exhibitors (ICE) for championship status in 1998. The breed had its own registry under the International Sterling Society. However, not many breeders of chinchilla Persian elected to switch over from the existing Persian standard to the new Sterling standard. Mrs Johnson died in 2006 before she could get wider buy-in for the breed. Due to lack of support, this Sterling breed does not exist anymore.

=== Chinchilla Longhair standard ===
In South Africa, all breeds cat judge and Chinchilla breeder Stella Slabber, headed up a project to separate the breed from the modern Persian standard. This standard was only to be applicable to color-bred silvers, commonly known as "Chinchillas" in South Africa. The breed was accepted under the name "Chinchilla Longhair" with breed code "CHL" in the SA Cat Council (SACC) in 1996.

=== Traditional Longhair standard for silver and golden varieties ===
A global standard for the "Traditional Longhair silver and golden, shaded and tipped varieties" was accepted by the WCF in August 2010. The breed proposal was compiled in Cape Town by Alida Delport. The facilitator of the breed recognition process was Dr. Johan Lamprecht, who also did the breed proposal presentation at the WCF. Nestle Purina sponsored the breed recognition show due to these cats being the brand animal used in their cat food advertisements world-wide.

The initial standard that was proposed at the 2010 WCF breed recognition show in Cape Town was based on the SACC standard with a request to include the golden varieties. After consultation with the Chairperson of the WCF Standard- and Judges Commission, Cornelia Hungerecker, the breed name was changed to "Tradition Longhair". One other minor differentiation was that the eye shape should read "walnut shaped" instead of "round".

== Breed recognition history post-2010 ==
The 2010 standard for Traditional Longhair silver and golden varieties was extended by the World Cat Federation (WCF) in 2012 to include all Persian color varieties.

In 2014 the World Cat Federation (WCF) changed the name "Traditional Longhair" to "Original Longhair".

The World Cat Congress promotes better understanding and co-operation among the world's major cat associations in matters of mutual interest and concern. It has nine members. In 2014, after a webinar, a project was started to obtain breed recognition of the Original Longhair in all WCC members.

== Gallery ==
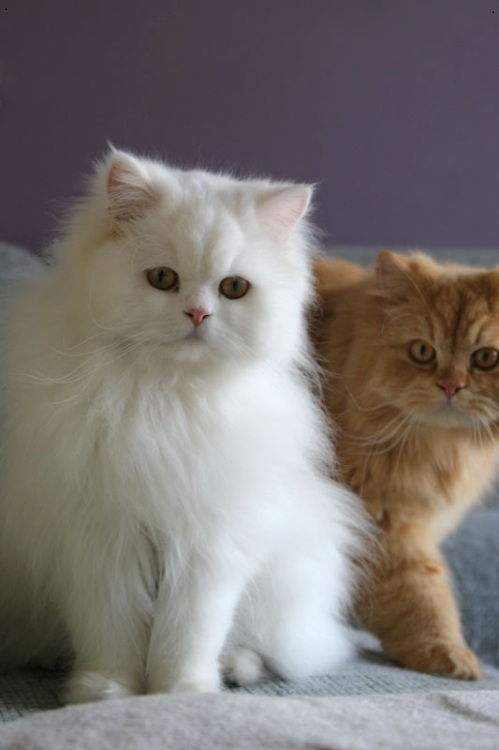

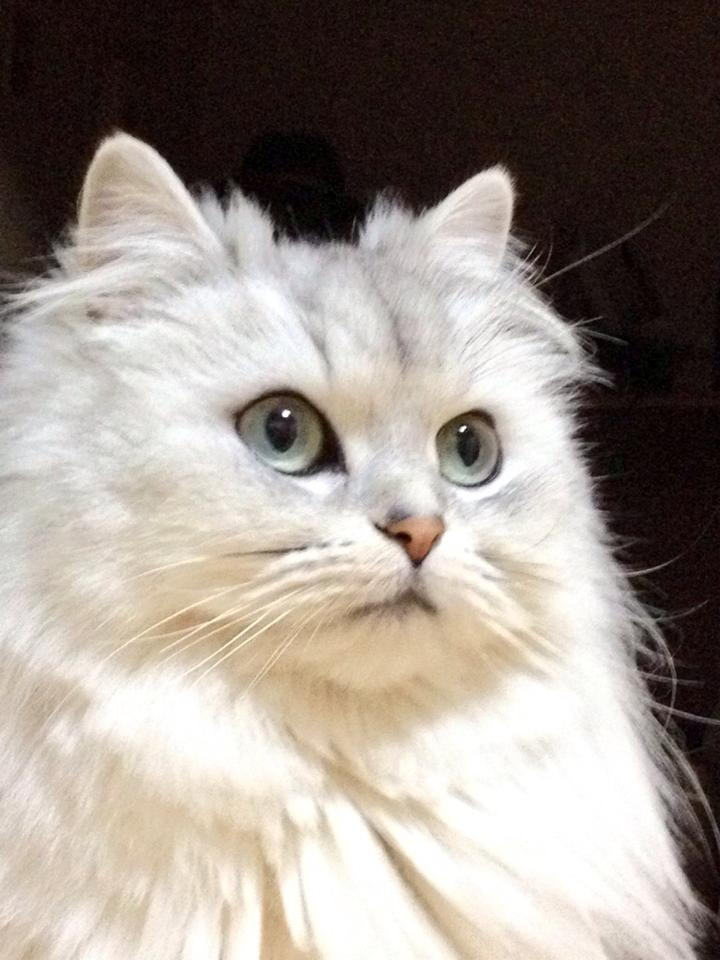

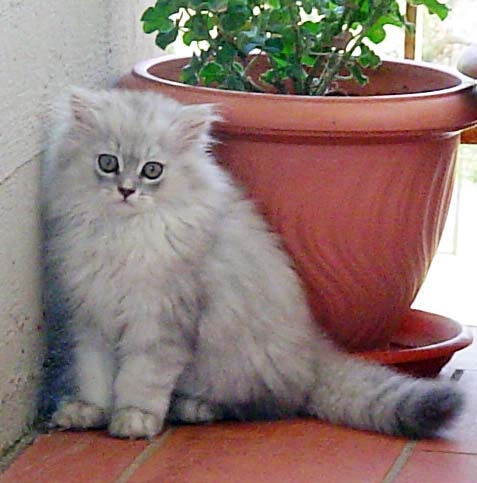

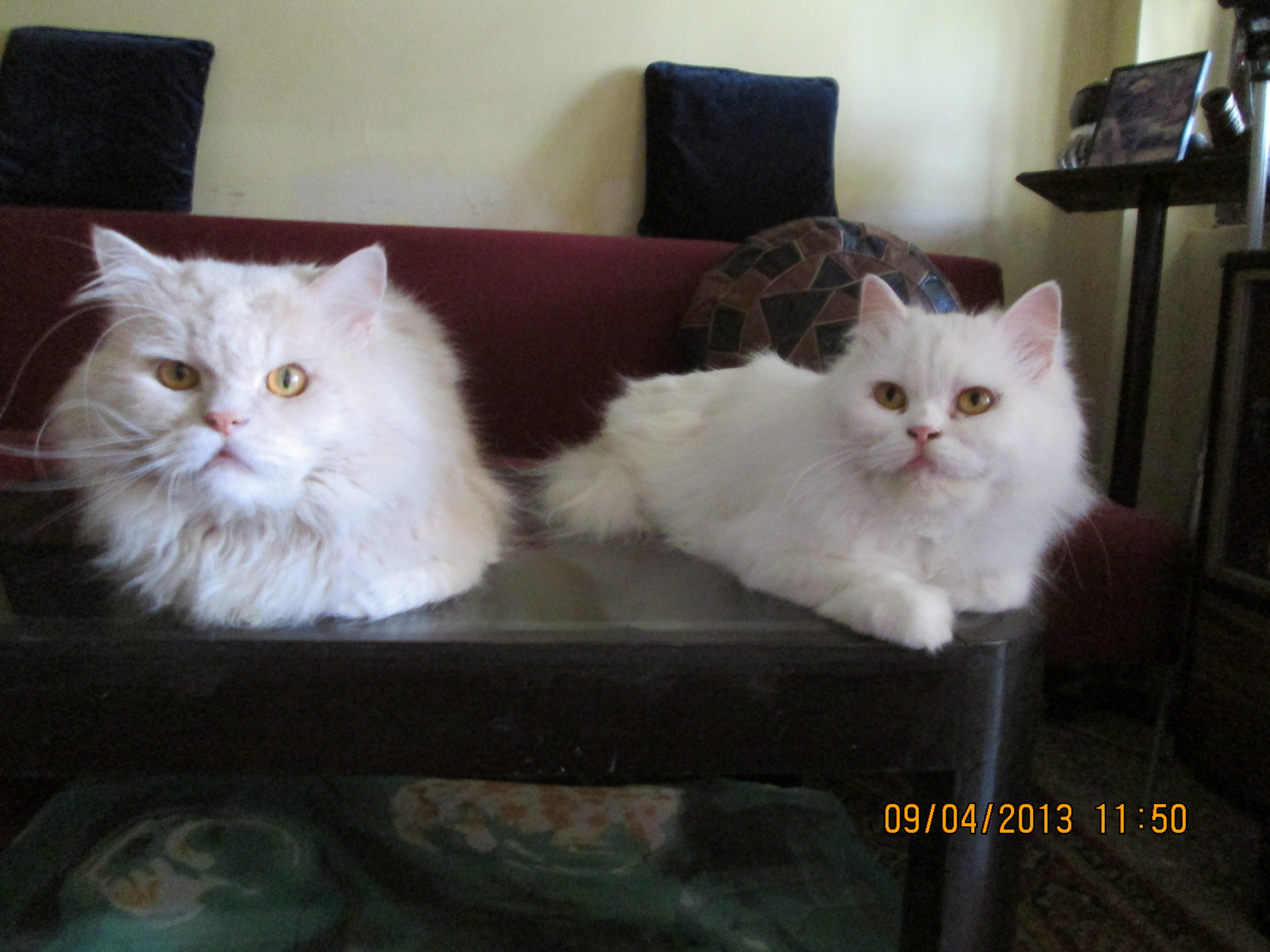

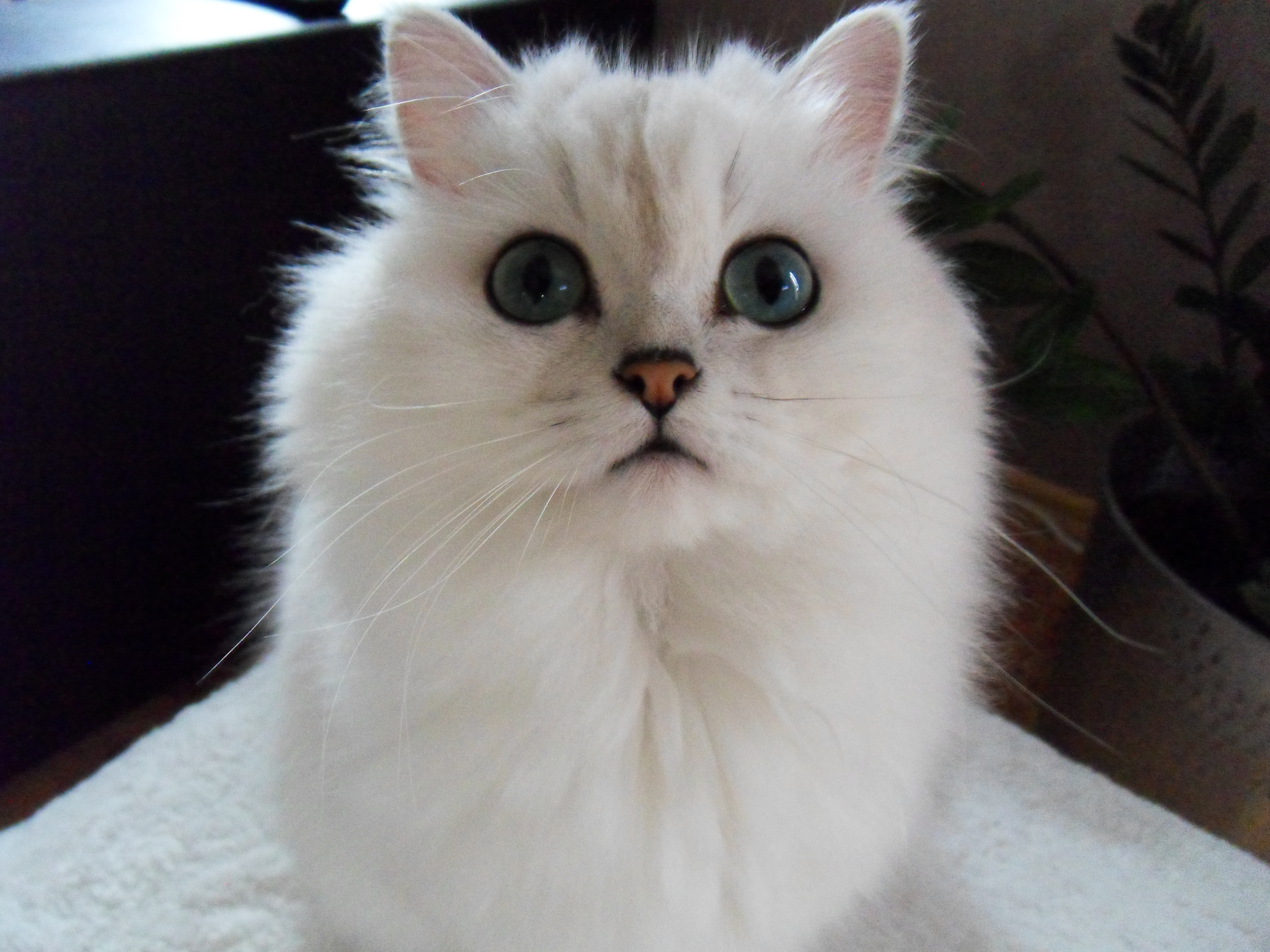

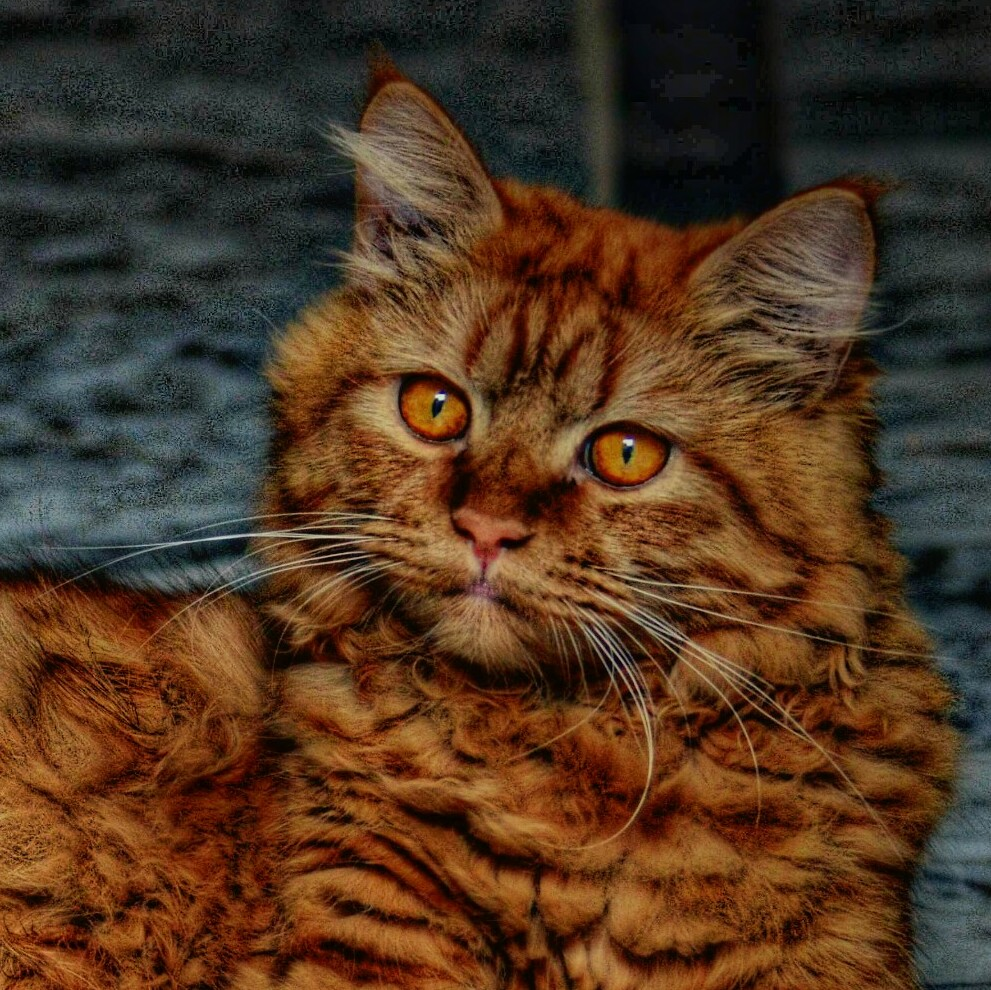

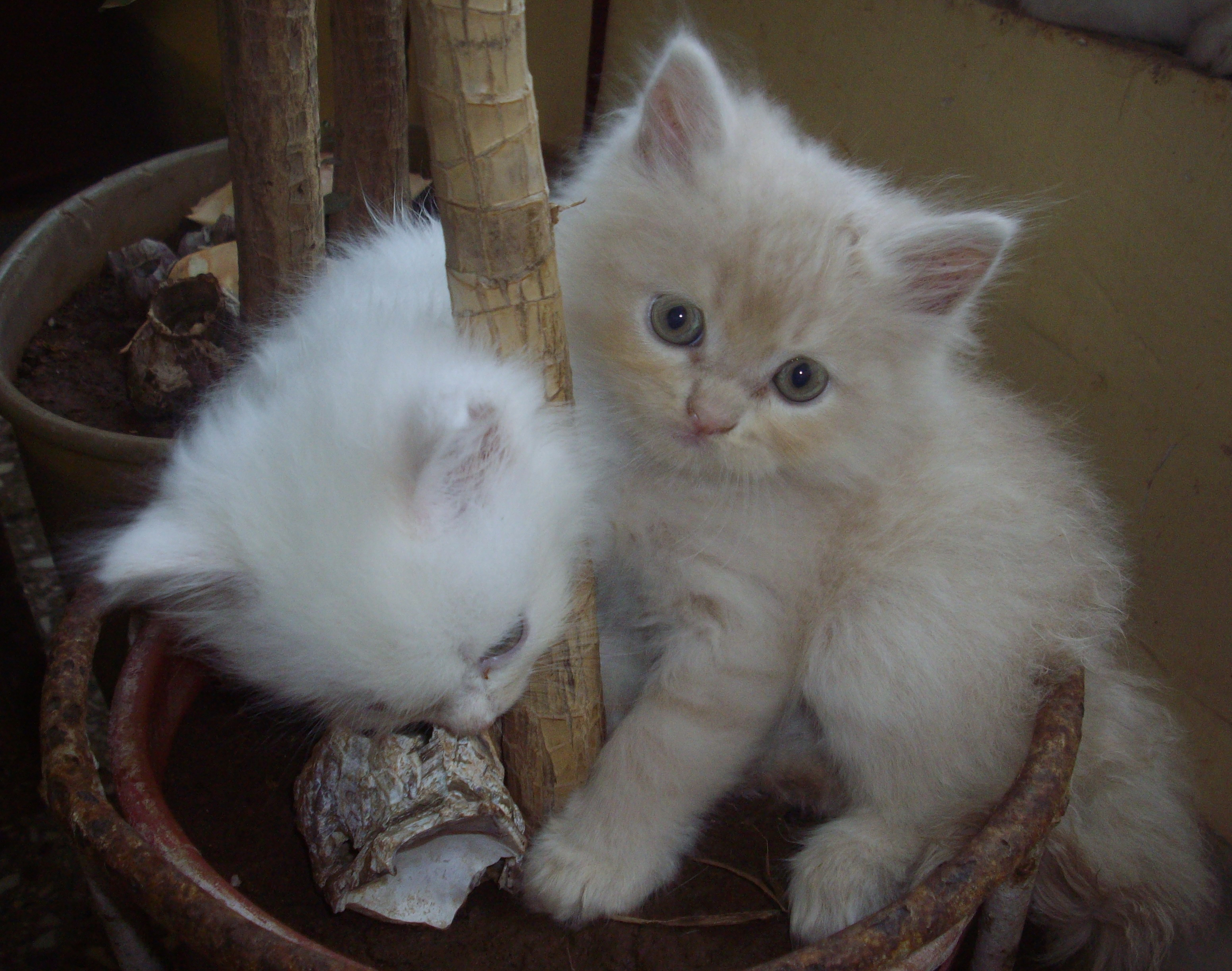

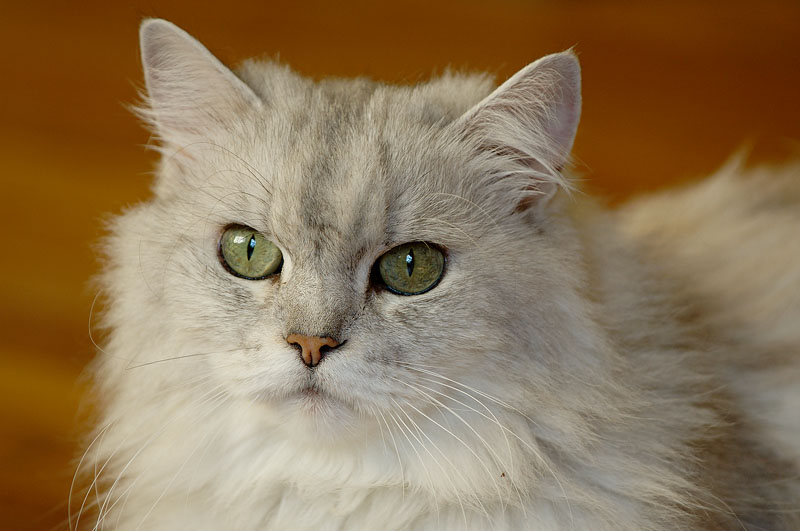

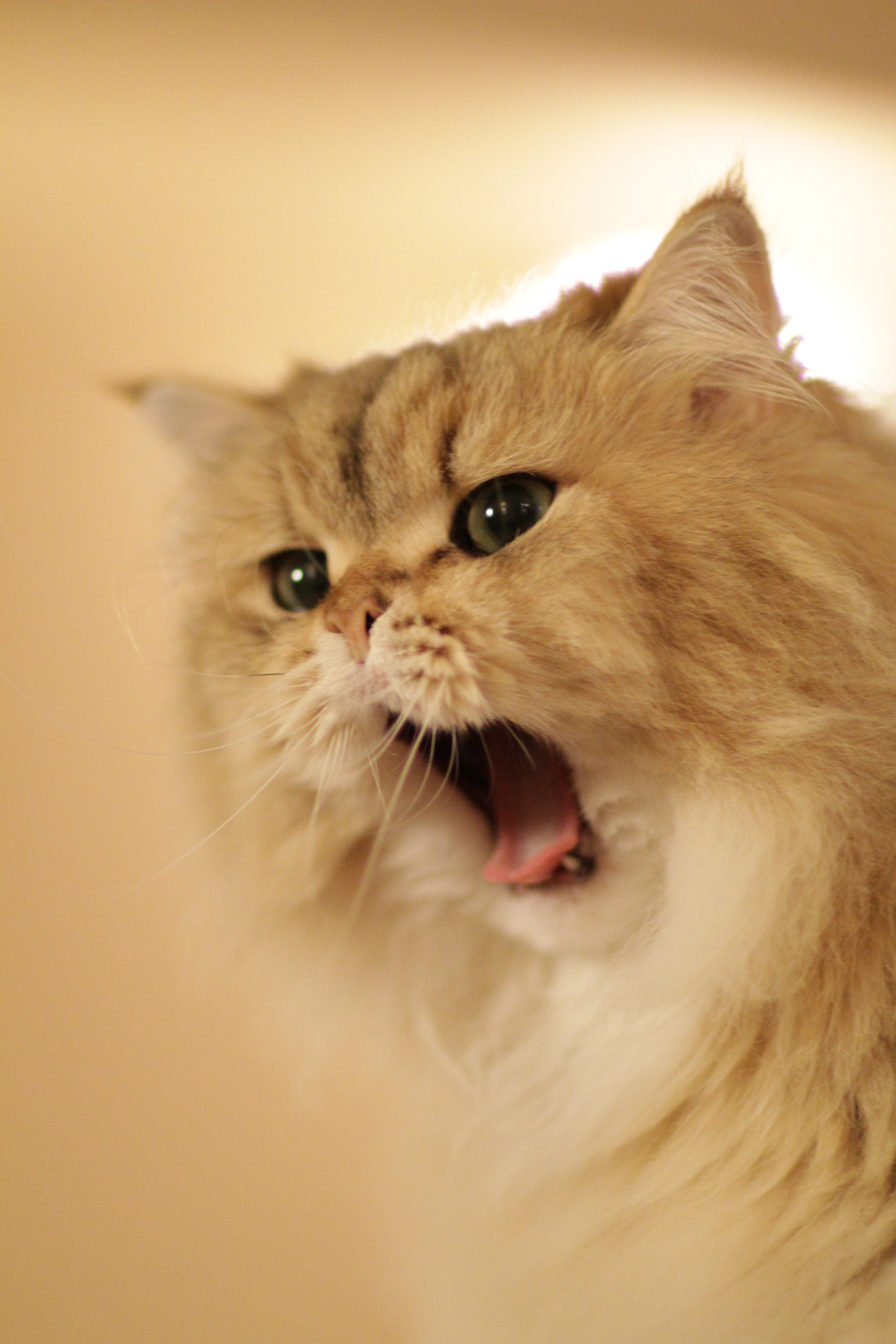

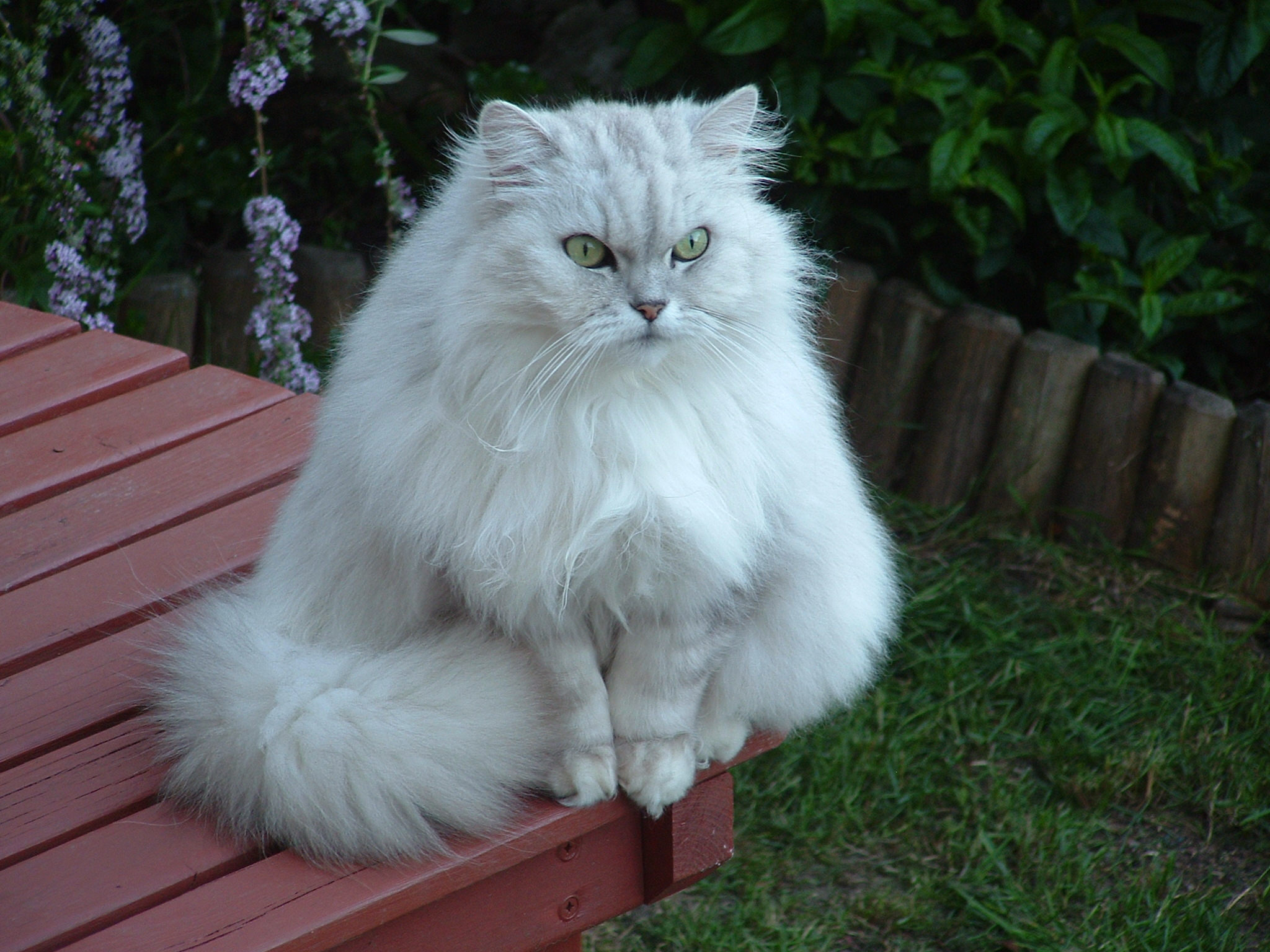
