= Donskoy cat =

Breed of cat

Donskoy
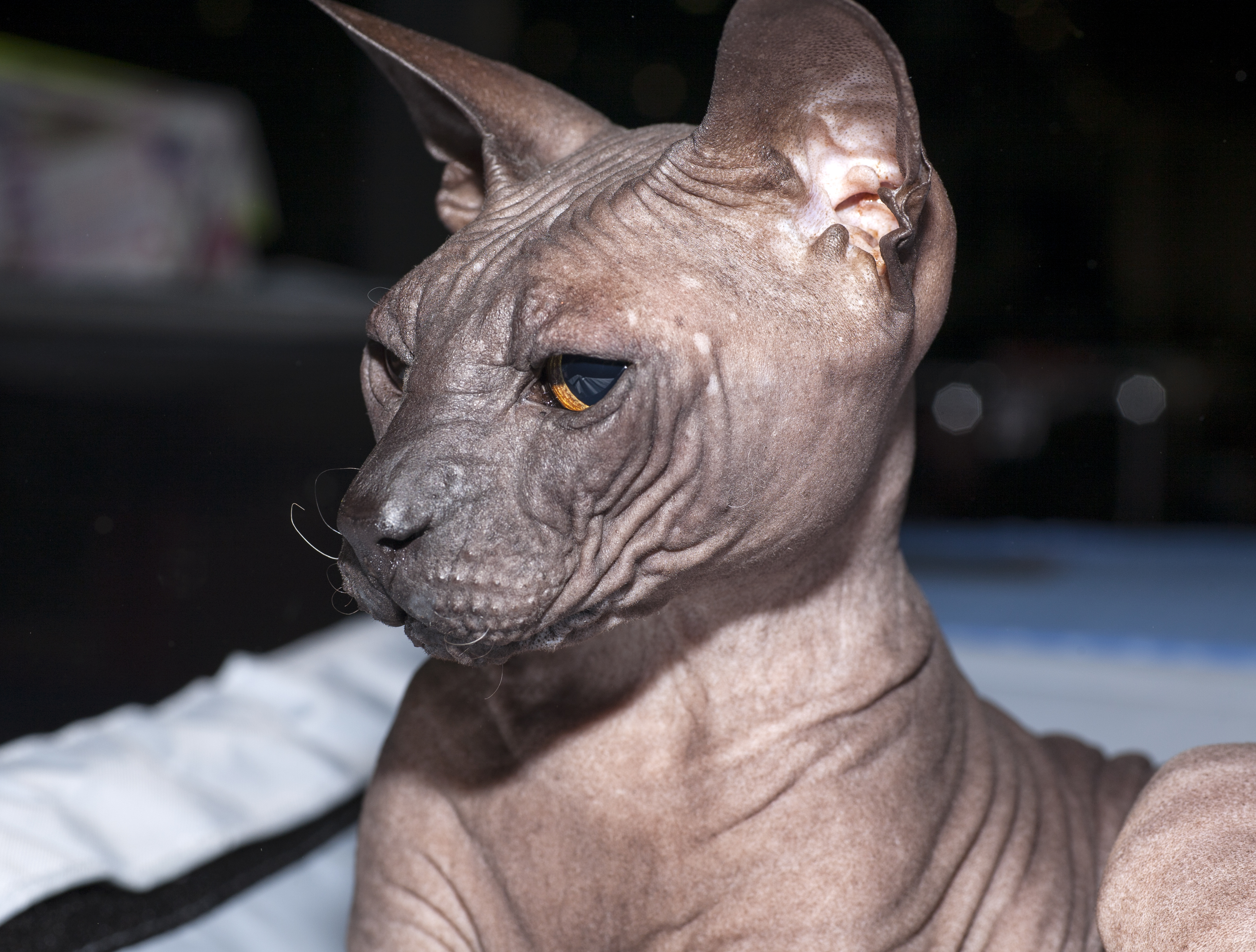
- Other names: Don Hairless, Don Sphynx, Russian Hairless
- Origin: Russia

Breed standards
- FIFe: standard
- TICA: standard

The Donskoy cat, also known as Don Sphynx or Russian Hairless, is a hairless cat breed of Russian origin. It is not related to the better-known Sphynx cat (Canadian Hairless) whose characteristic hairlessness is caused by a recessive mutation in the keratin 71 gene. The Donskoy's hairlessness, on the other hand, is caused by a dominant mutation.

== History ==
The Donskoy breed is able to be traced back to one kitten. This breed started in 1987 with the discovery of a hairless cat in the Russian city of Rostov-on-Don by cat breeder Elena Kovaleva. She had rescued a blue tortoiseshell kitten, which she named Varvara. At around four months of age, the cat began to lose fur. Varvara mated with a local tomcat and produced a litter of kittens. Some were born hairless, and the others started with hair but lost it like their mother. These kittens are the founding stock of the Donskoy breed and were later outcrossed with European Shorthair cats.

Over time, breeders learned more about the Donskoy's hair loss gene. Unlike the recessive gene carried by the Sphynx, the Donskoy's gene is dominant. So, all cats with the gene either are born hairless or lose their coats as they grow.

The Donskoy was first officially recognized by the World Cat Federation (WCF) in 1987 and by The International Cat Association (TICA) in 2005. The standard of points describes the cat as being medium-sized and muscular, with large ears, almond shaped eyes and distinctive long, webbed toes. They require frequent grooming, in spite of their lack of coat. However, over-bathing can cause the skin to become very oily.

The Peterbald breed was originally created by crossing Donskoy with Oriental Shorthair cats to create a hairless cat of Oriental-type. Matings between the Donskoy and the Peterbald are no longer permitted since 2000, and outcrossing is not permitted, except with the domestic shorthair, due to the effect of the Donskoy's dominant hairless mutation.

=== Breeding ban ===
Since 2014, it is illegal in the Netherlands to breed with parent cats which bear genetic mutations or other physical abnormalities that cause health or welfare issues in their offspring. The lack of protective fur in hairless cats, such as the Donskoy, is one of these banned mutations in parent cats.

== Physical appearance ==
The most striking physical characteristics of Donskoy cats is its hairlessness. Donskoys are medium sized, muscular cats in build. Their heads are triangular, with large ears and eyes which give Donskoys an elf-like appearance. Donskoy skin is very wrinkled, especially concentrated on the face, neck, chest, and the base of its tail.

Skin and eye color can range in Donskoy cats. Skin pattern colors tend to appear faded. While eye color can range from blue, green, amber, orange, yellow, or brown.

Some Donskoy cats may grow a faint fur coat during colder winter months, but the hair eventually falls off as warmer weather months return.

== Types of Donskoys ==
Donskoys can be segmented into four different categories, based primarily on the types of coats and the amount of hairlessness. See categories below.

Rubber Bald: Born completely bald, these Donskoys will remain that way throughout their lives.

Flock Coat: Flock Coat Donskoys are born with a light peach-fuzz like coat. Eventually as these Donskoys grow, they will often lose the fuzz and become completely bald.

Velour Coat: Unlike the Flock Coat and Rubber Bald, these Donskoy kittens are born with a wavy, short coat and a bald spot on the top of their heads. The wavy coat is short-lived, as within the first year, the kittens will lose their hair. Some Velour Coat Donskoys will continue to have a small amount of fuzz on their face, legs, and tail. Other Velour Coat Donskoys will lose all of their hair and become completely bald.

Brush Coat: Like the Velour Coat, the Brush Coat is also born with a short coat of fur; however, it is usually bristly or wiry. These Donskoys have bald spots on their head, neck, and back and do not lose the rest of fur as they grow. The Brush Coat Donskoy is the only type of Donskoy disqualified from the show ring.

== Health ==
Not all cat registries recognize the Donskoy, and there are some concerns about the genetic health of the breed. The dominant genetic mutation causing hairlessness in Peterbalds and Donskoys could cause feline ectodermal dysplasia in its homozygous form, causing problems including poor dentition and compromised ability to lactate or sweat. Similar dominant mutations (such as in FOXI3) cause the condition in hairless dogs, and the symptoms in dominant-type hairless cats and dogs mirror those of human ectodermal dysplasia (which also results in sparse or absent hair).

== Demeanor ==
Unlike some other cat breeds, the Donskoy cat is extremely social. Beyond its hairlessness, the Donskoy cat is very inquisitive and soft-hearted. Donskoy cats are typically active, therefore they require sufficient stimulation to keep them entertained. They spend more time moving around than the average cat. Due to their social behavior Donskoy cats do not do well being left alone for long periods of time.

Additionally, Donskoys are friendly and extremely intelligent. These characteristics make Donskoy cats ideal for training. The Donskoy cat’s good and gentle nature, along with social demeanor, makes them perfectly suited for families and are also great with children. The general disposition of the Donskoy cat is loving and amiable.

Thanks to their demeanor, Donskoys usually get along well with other cat breeds especially other playful cats. Their activity levels can cause challenges with older cats. Donskoys are capable of getting along with dogs as well, if properly introduced.

== Characteristics ==
Affection Level	High
Friendliness	High
Kid-Friendly	High
Pet-Friendly	Medium
Exercise Needs	Medium
Playfulness	High
Energy Level	Medium
Trainability	High
Intelligence	High
Tendency to Vocalize	Medium
Amount of Shedding	Low

== See also ==
- List of cat breeds
- List of cat body-type mutations
