= Brazilian Shorthair =

Breed of cat

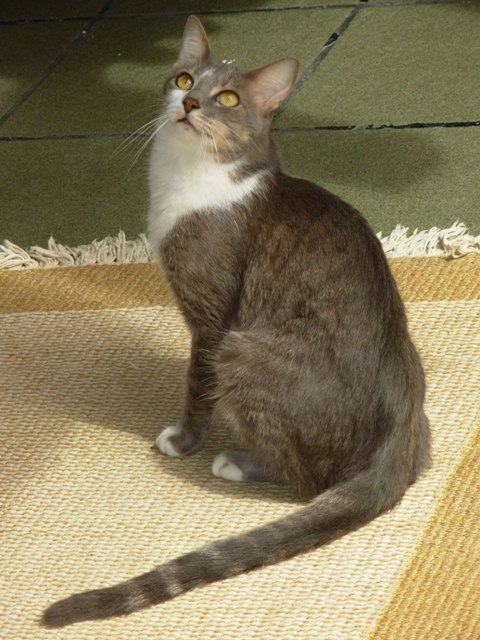
- Origin: Brazil

Breed standards
- WCF: standard

The Brazilian Shorthair is a breed of cat. It is the first cat breed from Brazil to receive international recognition.

== Description ==
The Brazilian Shorthair is a medium-sized cat of great agility. The breed can be distinguished from the American Shorthair by its sleek and elegant appearance, though cats of the breed are not as thin as the Siamese. The coat is short and close to the skin and comes in a wide variety of colors and patterns. The space between the eyes should be equal to the size of one eye. Brazilian Shorthairs have dramatically expressive eyes. They are longer than they are tall. Males have bigger heads than females.

The Brazilian Shorthair Cat had its beginning when the engineer Paulo Samuel Ruschi, a cat breeder and founder of the first Cat Federation in Brazil and the first Cat Club in Rio de Janeiro, had the idea to transform certain cats found in the streets of Brazil into a purebred cat. He focused on the Iberian Peninsula cats, brought to Brazil by the Portuguese in their ships around 1500 A.D. From North to South of Brazil, commissions were created by Dr. Paulo Ruschi to study this animal in all of the country's parks and streets. After long years of experimental breeding program led by traditional breeders, the Brazilian Shorthair was finally approved by the World Cat Federation, with headquarters in Germany, as a Pure Breed cat. Nowadays, the Brazilian Shorthair cat can participate in contests all over the world.

== Appearance ==
They have medium-sized and muscular bodies. The tail should not be broad at the base, and should slightly taper in the tip. Brazilian Shorthair cats have a slightly curved profile and large, pointed ears, and large, rounded eyes with colour that resembles the coat's colour. The coat is very short, silky and glossy and with no undercoat. Minimal brushing is required. Almost all colours are possible.

== Temperament ==
The breed was purportedly started by a cat breeder named Paulo Samuel Ruschi, who founded the first Cat Federation in Brazil and the first Cat Club in Rio de Janeiro. Paulo Ruschi started this effort in 1985. Ruschi noticed that feral and street cats from multiple cities in Brazil shared a good number of common characteristics, and decided to look into this further. Ruschi's research apparently traced these cats' origins back to the late 15th century early 16th century, to cats brought over on ships by Portuguese colonizers and merchants.

His theory then proposes that these cats brought from Portugal descended from cats from the Iberian Peninsula. Therefore, the Brazilian Shorthair's ancestors are from the Iberian Peninsula. These Portuguese cats, once in Brazil, settled and then began adapting to their new climate conditions, leading to the creation of a landrace population

The claim here is that, like how cats brought from Europe to North America evolved to develop some differences (from which two landrace/natural breeds were developed - the Maine Coon and American Shorthair), European moggies brought to South America also diverged over time. Supposedly, South American cats are generally lighter and skinnier than their ancestors (their main comparison being with the European Shorthair). This is plausible, since cats in warmer areas tend to have more slender body types. Street and feral cats from Brazil are claimed to be a distinct landrace within the South American cat population, similar to the Maine Coon within the North American cat population.

Ruschi himself notes that Brazilian shorthairs are different from cats in Europe, though he doesn't seem to have research to back this up, only his personal account that when visiting Europe (can't seem to find a specification of what area), the street cats there were larger, more robust, had wider heads, and shorter muzzles.

== History ==
The breed had developed without rules or special cares; until, in the 1980s, Brazilian-born engineer Paulo Samuel Ruschi, a cat breeder currently living in New York City, started to settle the rules for the breed after deciding to study genetic and morphological aspects of the cats running in parks, gardens and streets of several cities in Brazil. He noticed that the country had unique cats, and yet, that those street cats had the same appearance and features. Those are the characteristics that define the Brazilian Shorthair cat. In 1998 the World Cat Federation, the largest Cat Federation in the world, gave a status of "approved breed" to the first and only Brazilian Recognized Purebred Cat, now with more than 10 generations of pedigreed cats.

== Breeders ==
Engineer Paulo Samuel Ruschi was the founder of the first Brazilian Cat Federation, known as FBG – Federação Brasileira do Gato; founder of the first cat club in Rio de Janeiro, then named Clube Brasileiro do Gato do Rio de Janeiro; and the founder of 7 other cat clubs in Brazil. In 1988, Paulo Samuel Ruschi and his friend Anneliese Hackmann, from Germany, founded the WCF – World Cat Federation, at the time consisting solely of clubs created by the two of them, but now the largest federation in the world. The Brazilian Shorthair project is managed by the BSICS – Brazilian Shorthair International Cat Society, which has headquarters in New York City and is member of the WCF (whose President is Paulo Samuel Ruschi).

Several Brazilian Shorthair breeders have taken Paulo's creation to pursue the dream of the Brazilian Shorthair as a purebred cat. One of the most important of those breeders is Mrs. Sylvia Roriz de Carvalho, a veterinarian, painter and cat breeder, whose Cattery Syarte has been breeding the Brazilian Shorthair for more than a decade. Several other breeders followed in her footsteps. Now, in all WCF Cat Shows in Brazil, one can see Brazilian Shorthairs whose lineage traces back to several generations, competing side by side with other breeds. The Brazilian Shorthair has been shown and cited by several magazines in many parts of the world, such as Japan, Germany, England, Australia, and the US.

Despite this worldwide success, there are still very few Brazilian Shorthair breeders in its native country. The breeding of random street cats has been met with much opposition among animal rights activists and professional cat breeders.
