= Cyprus cat =

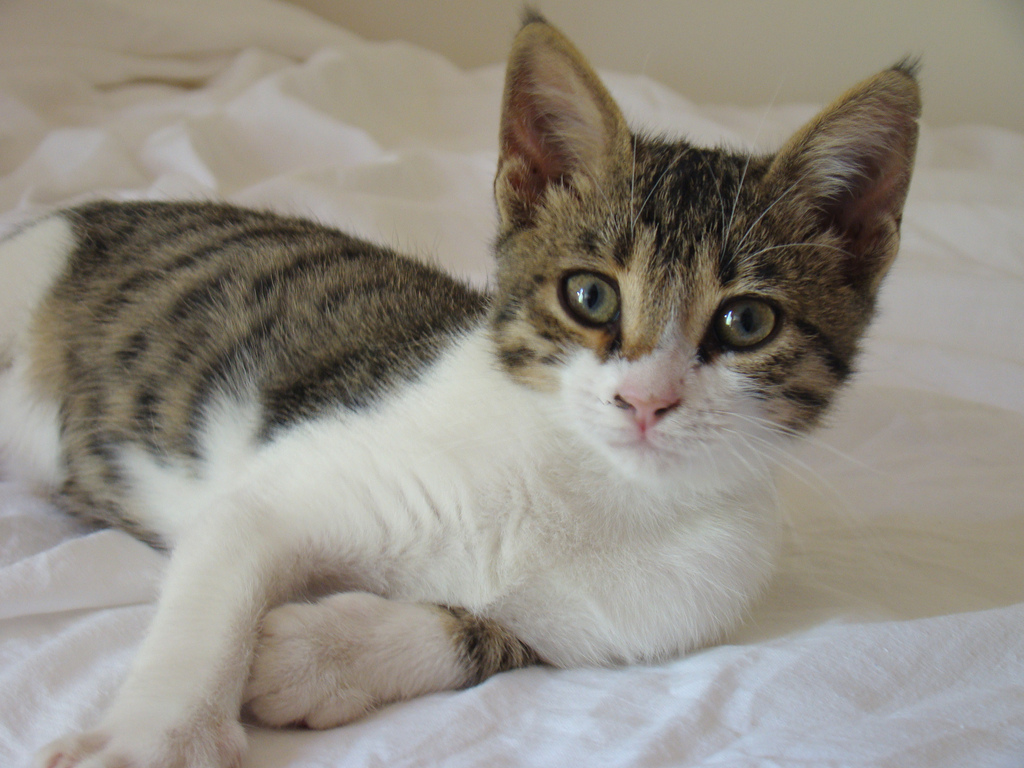
- A short-haired female kitten
- Other names: Cypriot cat, Saint Helen cat, Saint Nicholas cat
- Origin: Cyprus; foundation stock likely from Ancient Egypt
- Variety status: Not recognized as a standardized breed by any major breed registry.

Notes
- Cyprus cats are a landrace, not a standardized breed.

Cyprus cats, also known as Cypriot cats, Saint Helen cats, and Saint Nicholas cats, are a landrace of domestic cat found across the island of Cyprus. A standardized breed is being developed from them; among cat fancier and breeder organizations, it is presently fully recognized by the World Cat Federation (WCF), with breeding regulated by the World Cat Congress (WCC), under the name Aphrodite's Giant; and provisionally by The International Cat Association (TICA) as the Aphrodite. All three organizations permit shorthaired and semi-longhaired versions and no out-crossing to other breeds.

The earliest known written record of cats on Cyprus refers to a story of Saint Helen of Constantinople sending two boatloads of cats to a monastery on the island from Egypt or Palestine in the 4th century AD to deal with an infestation of snakes. Cats on Cyprus have been able to breed for centuries with comparatively little outside influence; this has resulted in a distinct, locally adapted variety of cat which appears to have developed as a feral population in the inner highlands, though is found throughout the island in modern times. While wildcats in association with humans on Cyprus date to at least 7500 BC – the earliest proven association of cats with humans – there is no known connection between those ancient tamed-wild specimens and modern domesticated Cyprus cats, despite breeder claims to the contrary.

== History ==
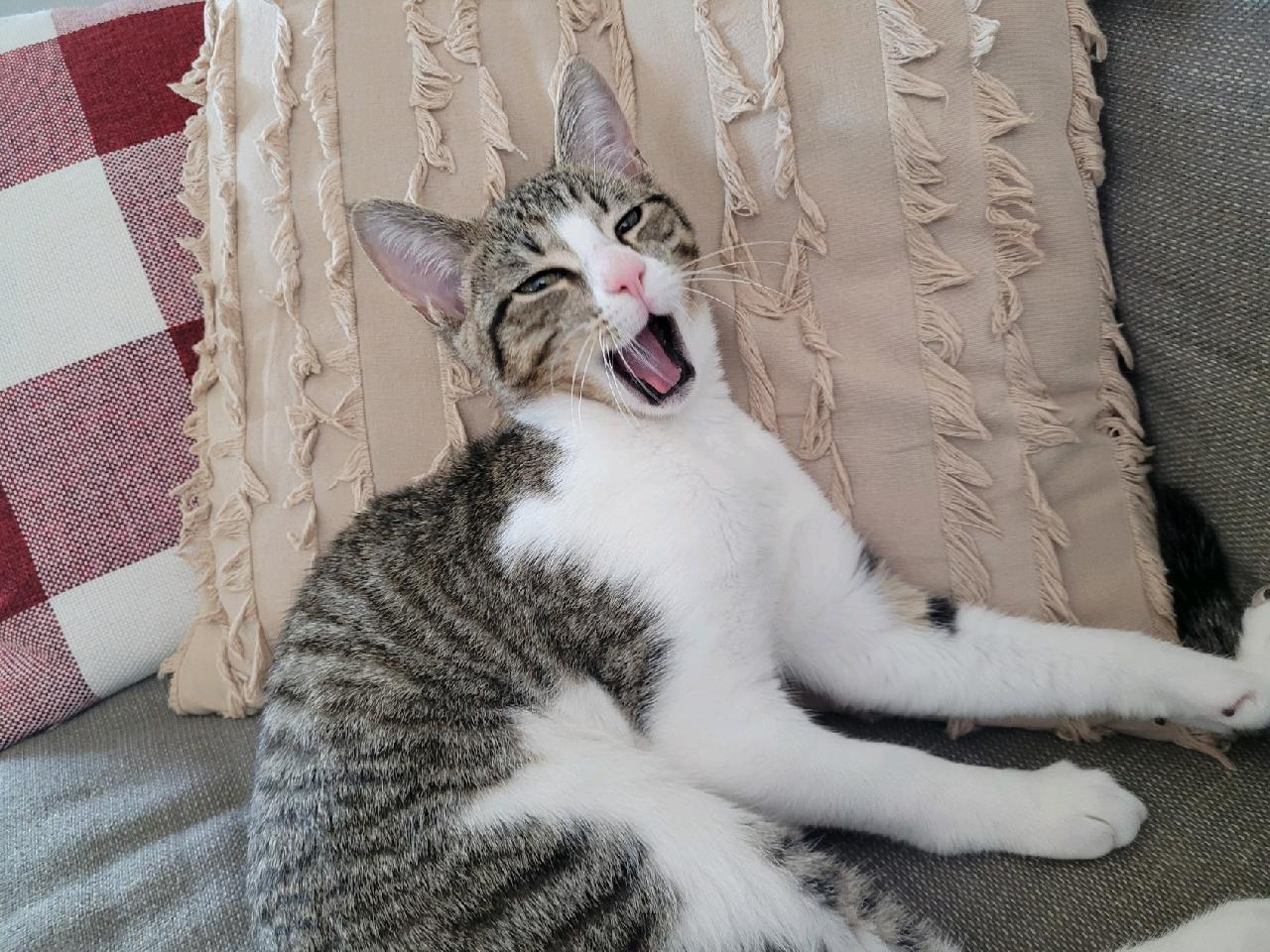
A domesticated Cyprus cat yawning

A 2004 study by MNHN's J.-D. Vigne et al. concluded that the discovery of Near Eastern wildcat (Felis silvestris lybica) remains in a 9,500-year-old grave in Cyprus was the oldest example of a cat in close association with humans discovered so far. Archaeologists led by Jean Guilaine of EHESS Toulouse working at the Neolithic site of Shillourokambos uncovered carefully interred remains of a cat about 8 months old alongside human remains and decorative artifacts, on an island separated from the mainland since before human habitation, thus indicating human introduction of cats to the area. "Examination showed that a small pit or grave had been deliberately dug out, and the body of the cat was placed in it, then rapidly covered." The cat skeleton pre-dates Egyptian depictions of cats by 4,000 years or more.

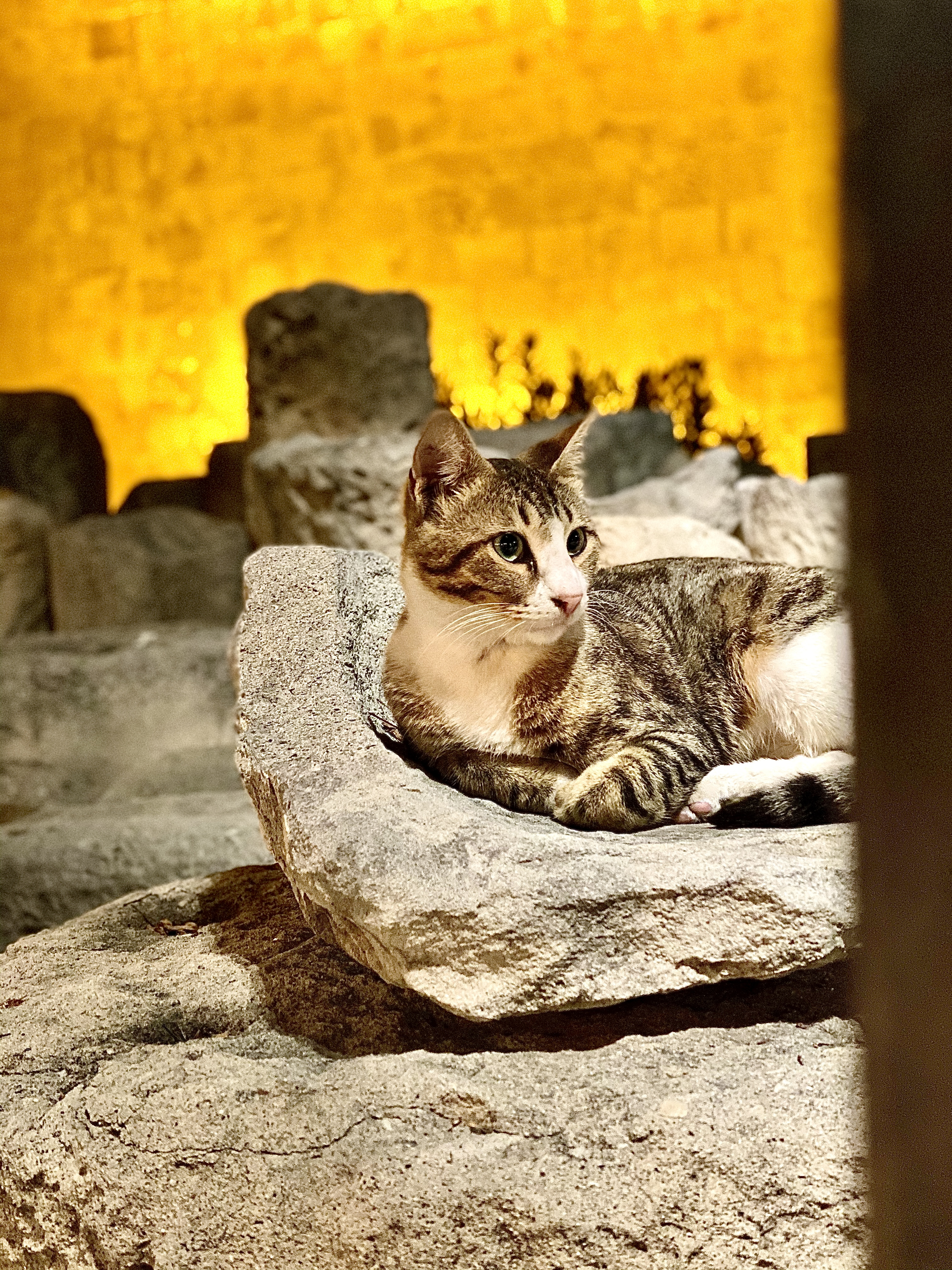
Cypriot cat at the Limassol Medieval Castle

There is no evidence that modern cats of any variety are descended from ancient Cypriot wildcats; nevertheless both WCF and TICA have uncritically repeated breeder claims of such descent. Cyprus cats of today are more likely linked with the monastery named Saint Nicholas of the Cats (Greek: Άγιος Νικόλαος των Γατών, romanized: Ágios Nikólaos ton Gatón), which was founded in the 4th century AD. It is located near Akrotiri. According to Byzantine legend, Empress Helena of Constantinople (Saint Helen) shipped hundreds of cats from Egypt or Palestine to Cyprus in 328 AD to control venomous snakes that had infested the area around the monastery, following a drought lasting 37 years. The monastery had two bells, one to call the cats to meals and the other to send them into the fields to hunt snakes. The population of cats at the site (today a nunnery) once dwindled, but has now revived thanks to care by the resident nuns. The Nobel laureate Giorgos Seferis wrote of these cats in his poem "The Cats of St. Nicholas". The story being a legend, it is impossible to know for certain today if shiploads of cats were really sent to Cyprus in the 4th century and cats have, of course, been arriving on the island (often as ship's cats) for many centuries.

The World Cat Congress is of the opinion that Cyprus cats developed over time in mountainous inner Cyprus from various populations of cats around the island and became large and bushy-haired to cope with hunting comparatively large prey like rats, big lizards and snakes in cool, wet, mountain weather, though summers there are fairly hot and dry (Both WCF and TICA note that the thickness of the coat in purebred Aphrodite cats descended from this populations still varies seasonally). The other two organizations' breed summaries are generally consistent with this view, though it is uncertain who first produced this account of their origin, or on what basis. It is unclear whether Cyprus cats are closely related to the broader Aegean cat landrace of mainland and island Greece. Genetic testing in the early 2010s (see below) showed that the Cyprus cats are distinct enough from mainland Turkish cats that a breed could be developed from them, but no Aegean samples were included in the analysis. Also, indications of gene flow signifying ongoing transport of cats between Cyprus and the Turkish mainland (in both directions) was found, with Cyprus-cat-like genotypes even occurring in occasional individuals assigned to the Turkish Angora and Turkish Van breeds. Nevertheless, the bulk of the semi-domesticated cats from Cyprus in the analysis belonged to a lineage about as distinct as the Van cats, with little mainland admixture in recent times.

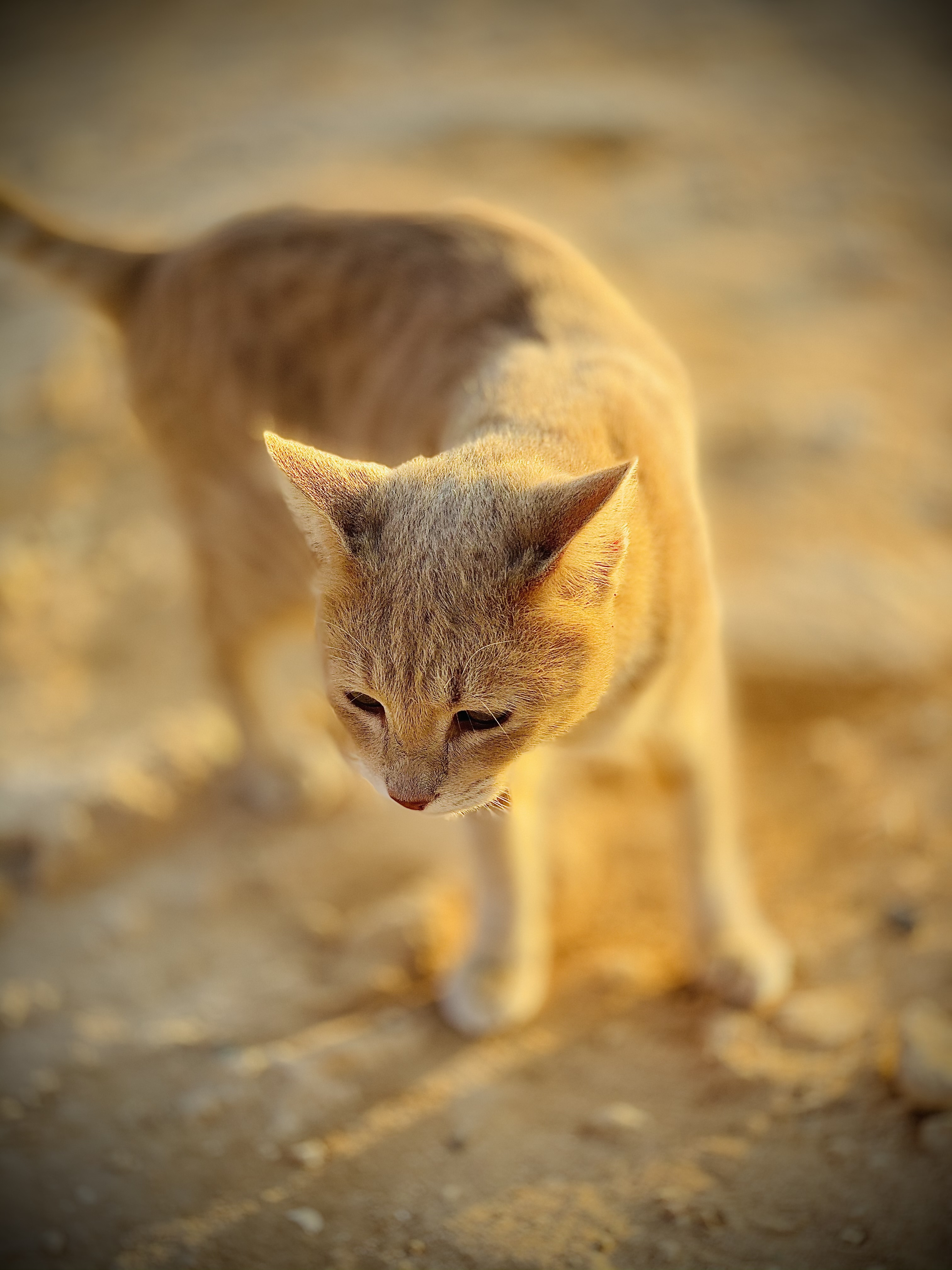
Cypriot cat wandering around Cape Greco

== Characteristics ==
Cyprus cats are somewhat thick-haired (from short-haired up to "semi-longhaired" in cat fanciers' jargon), and are an athletic and energetic variety. Feral populations are found throughout the island of Cyprus, from mountainous and cooler regions to the lower, hotter areas near the coasts, including in the cities. As such, this cat has locally adapted to different climates / seasonal change; however, it may be more associated with the mountainous areas.

== Aphrodite breed development ==
Aphrodite
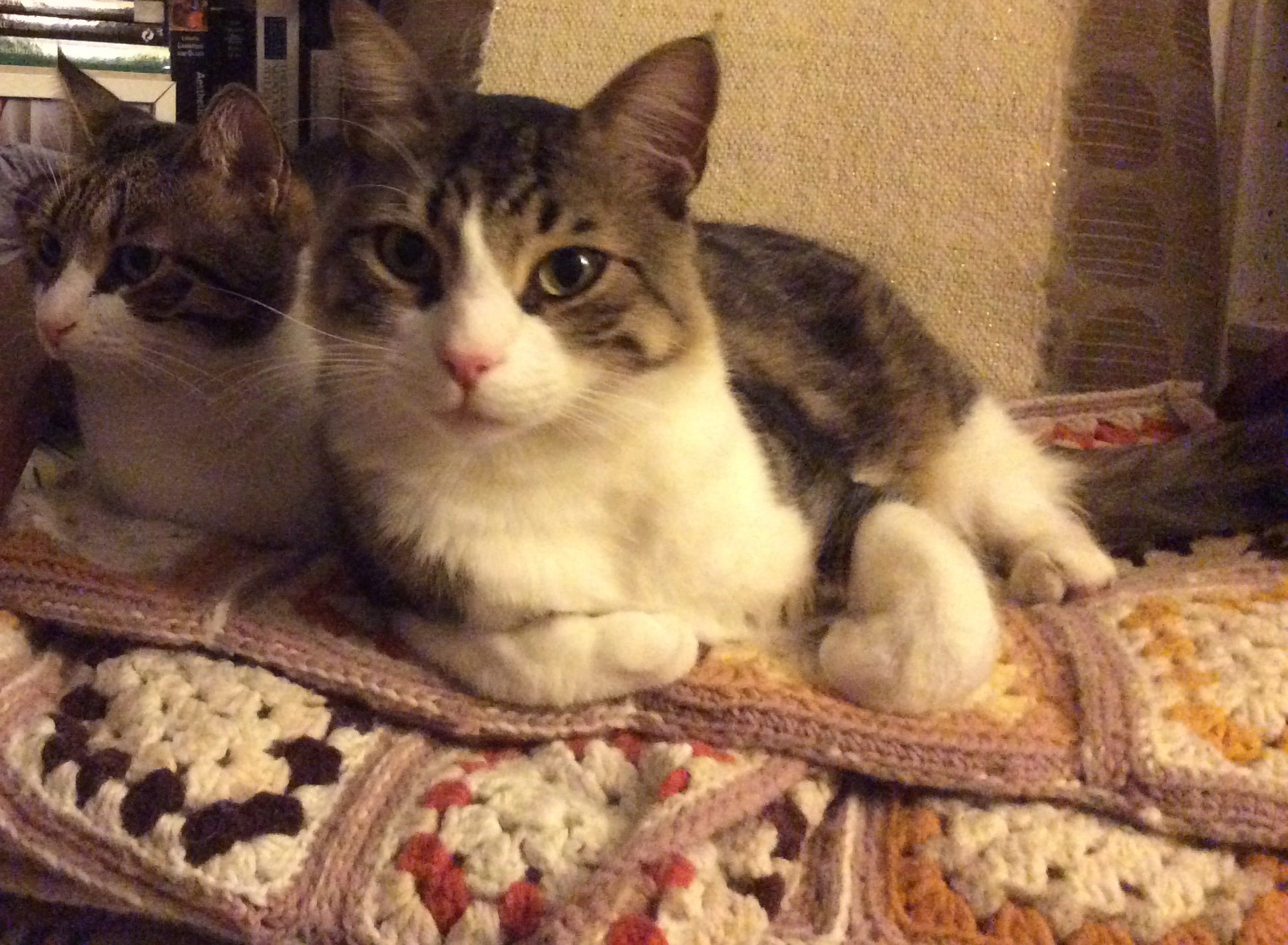
- A semi-long-haired adult male
- Other names: Aphrodite Giant, Aphrodite's Giant Longhair, Aphrodite's Giant Shorthair
- Origin: Cyprus

Breed standards
- TICA: standard
- WCF: standard

Notes
- TICA recognition is only preliminary.

Local breeders began in 2006 to attempt to establish a standardized breed from local feral cats. In 2008, a World Cat Federation (WCF) all-breeds judge visited Cyprus to work at a cat show and was introduced to a breeder of purebred cats developed in this trial breeding program from the Cyprus cats. Considering the cats distinct, he wrote a standard of points and named them Aphrodite Giant. The president and board members of WCF advised that these Aphrodite cats should be shown outside Cyprus to become better known within the cat fancy, but did not immediately accept the nascent breed. Subsequently, a group of interested people in Cyprus decided to form a club, which was named the Cyprus Cats National Breed Association (CyCNBA), which applied for government approval and started functioning in late 2009. CyCNBA applied to affiliate to the WCF in April 2012.

Meanwhile, University of California, Davis geneticist Leslie A. Lyons was preparing a global comparative study of domestic cat genotypes, with particular focus on Angora cats and the landrace Van cat. A cooperation with the Cyprus cat initiative and National Geographic was established, providing random-bred Cyprus cats from the Malcolm Cat Sanctuary for comparison with landrace and random-bred Turkish mainland cats. "All cats were considered in one large analysis. The analysis partitioned the cats based solely on genetic variation, not by any other identification." (L. Lyons – 2 January 2012) The January 2012 report concluded that "Cyprus cats are a distinct population within the Mediterranean" and that a "breed from Cyprus could be developed".

On 1 July 2012, the cat became a fully recognised breed of the WCF, originally as just the Aphrodite's Giant Longhair (though it is actually in the organization's semi-longhaired division) after the CyCNBA attended the WCF General Assembly in Gelsenkirchen, Germany and applied for recognition of the cats in April 2012. Today, WCF also recognizes a short-haired variant.

In September 2017, The International Cat Association (TICA) recognized the cats, under the name Aphrodite, as a "preliminary new breed", in its own breed group and with both shorthaired and semi-longhaired varieties. Some TICA members have started breeding programs for the Aphrodite in Europe, Asia, and the United States.

In breeder terminology, this constitutes a natural or traditional breed – one developed from local stock to preserve its key characteristics, rather than created by breeders to have new features.

=== Breed standards ===
The WCF standard calls for the Aphrodite's Giant to be large, strong, and muscular but not cobby, and big-boned even as kittens. The cats may be shorthaired or semi-longhaired and of any colors other than colorpoint or mink (which comes from the Burmese gene), nor with any white spots if otherwise solid-colored. "In bicolour, non-regular colour setting is desired." The coat should be soft and wooly, and is expected to be longer and with an undercoat in winter, and always lacking any top coat except possibly on the back. In detail, WCF calls for muscular hips and shoulders; back legs slightly longer than front (a trait shared with another insular breed, the Manx); medium-long, "well-plumed" tail, commensurate with body size (and visibly tapering in the shorthaired version); a long-triangular head with straight cheeks, long and straight muzzle, "strong" chin, rounded front of the face, slightly domed forehead and "a very slight dip under the height of the eyes"; wide-based, medium-large ears, forming an open V (rather than being straight upward); and olive-shaped, oblique-set eyes of any uniform color. Weight range is not specified.

WCF has set no temperament or breeding rules for this breed, and defers on breeding points instead to the World Cat Congress (WCC), which permits no out-crossing, other than between the longhaired and shorthaired varieties of the breed. Only WCC (a confederation of national and international cat federations, which does not itself issue breed standards, just breeding regulations) uses the term Aphrodite's Giant Shorthair for the latter. WCC asks that judges disqualify smaller specimens of both, to preserve the large-boned nature of the breed.

Under the TICA definition, Aphrodites may be shorthaired or semi-longhaired and have any color and pattern, except they may not be colorpoint or mink and should not have a "locket" spot on the chest. The coat should be soft and lush and may seasonally vary in undercoat density (not required). They are "athletic, well-muscled, solid" and of medium to large build, but must have a gentle, non-aggressive temperament. Fully adult male weight range is 15–18 pounds (6.8–8.2 kg); female, 10–14 pounds (4.5–6.4 kg), which is heavy for a female cat. On finer points, the TICA standard calls for hips and shoulders of the same width; back legs slightly longer than front; an overall long-triangular, straight-cheeked head with a squared but not flattened muzzle and slight concavity between nose and brow leading to a slightly rounded forehead; wide-based, wide-set and fairly large ears forming an open V; oblique, olive-shaped eyes of any color; a full-width chin of normal depth; medium-long, tapering tail consistent with the body and coat (and plumed in the longhaired version). Jowls are permitted in adult males. No out-crossing to other cats is permitted (though the two varieties of Aphrodite are a single breed for TICA purposes).

WCF and TICA sharply conflict with each other on the cat's speed of maturity, perhaps owing to different foundation stock for their breed variants. The WCF standard says that they develop quickly, while TICA says they are comparatively slow to mature (another trait shared with the Manx), taking three to five years to reach full size.

TICA's overview of the breed describes them as affectionate and social and in some ways dog-like in behavior toward their keepers.
