= European Shorthair =

Breed of domestic cat

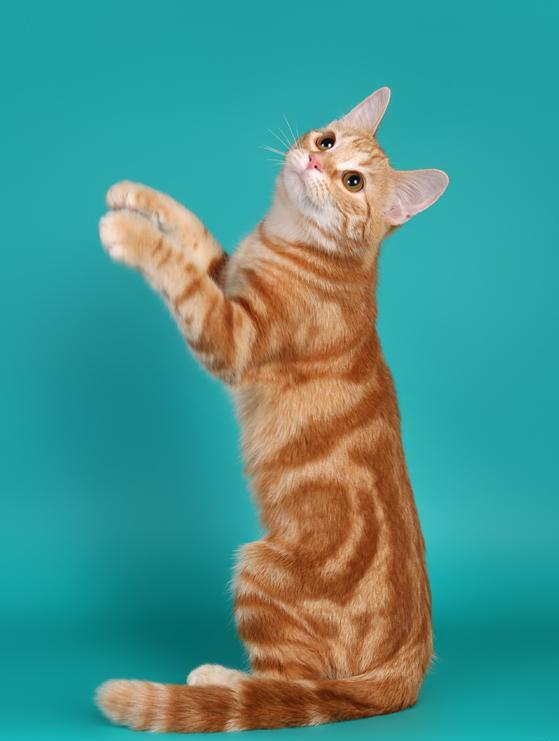
- Red blotched tabby European Shorthair
- Other names: Celtic
- Origin: Sweden
- Foundation bloodstock: European landrace population

Breed standards
- FIFe: standard
- WCF: standard
- LOOF: standard

The European Shorthair, also known as the European and Celtic/European Shorthair, is a pedigreed breed of domestic cat. The breed's name has also been erroneously used to describe the non-pedigreed landrace domestic cat of Europe, causing confusion as the pedigreed cats of this breed also should resemble the typical domestic cats of Europe.

The role as the cat breed resembling the original domestic cats of Europe was held until the beginning of the 20th century by the British Shorthair, even though stockier than the majority of common European cats, until 1949 when the European Shorthair was recognised by the Fédération internationale féline (FIFe). The oldest known European Shorthair registered in FIFe was born in 1940.

== History ==
=== Origin ===
European Shorthair has its counterparts in Great Britain (British Shorthair) and the U.S. (American Shorthair), though these breeds have been bred for longer. The British Shorthair, however, was crossed with the Persian and selectively bred to become a cobbier cat with a slightly shortened muzzle and thicker coat.

It was confusing for Scandinavian breeders that the British Shorthair was also called European Shorthair at that time, even though it looked different. Felinological associations recognised both types of cat as a single breed, meaning they were judged by the same standards during cat shows, until 1982 when FIFe registered the Scandinavian type of European Shorthair as a separate breed with its own standard.

== Breed registration ==
=== Breed recognition ===
As of 2023, the European (Shorthair) cat breed is recognised by ACF, FIFe, LOOF, TICA (registration only), and WCF.

=== Popularity ===
The breed is mostly popular in Scandinavia, but also in Germany, as there are still huge populations of similar-looking cats in Europe, and the European Shorthairs are for those appreciating a supple breed which has had a selection for a good temper. The European Shorthair is on the list of endangered breeds in Sweden and is the national cat of Finland.

== Characteristics ==
=== Appearance ===
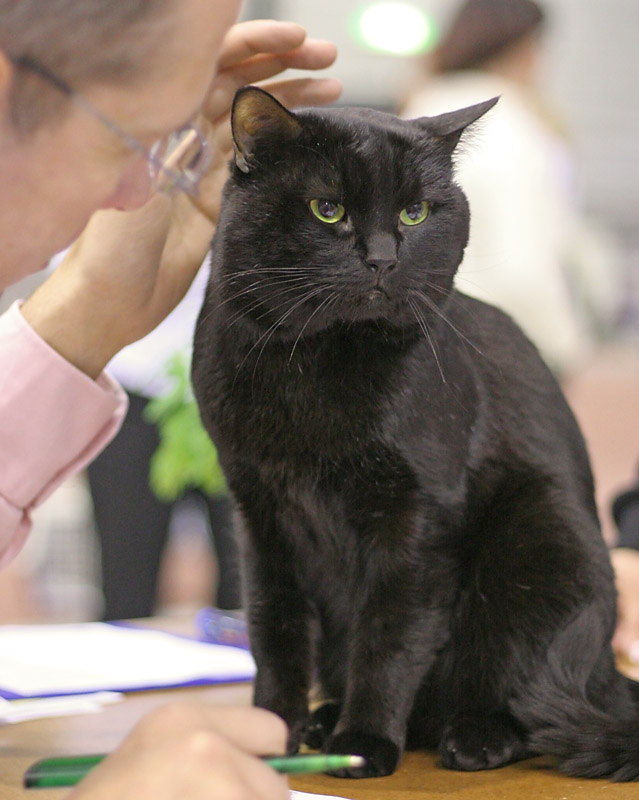
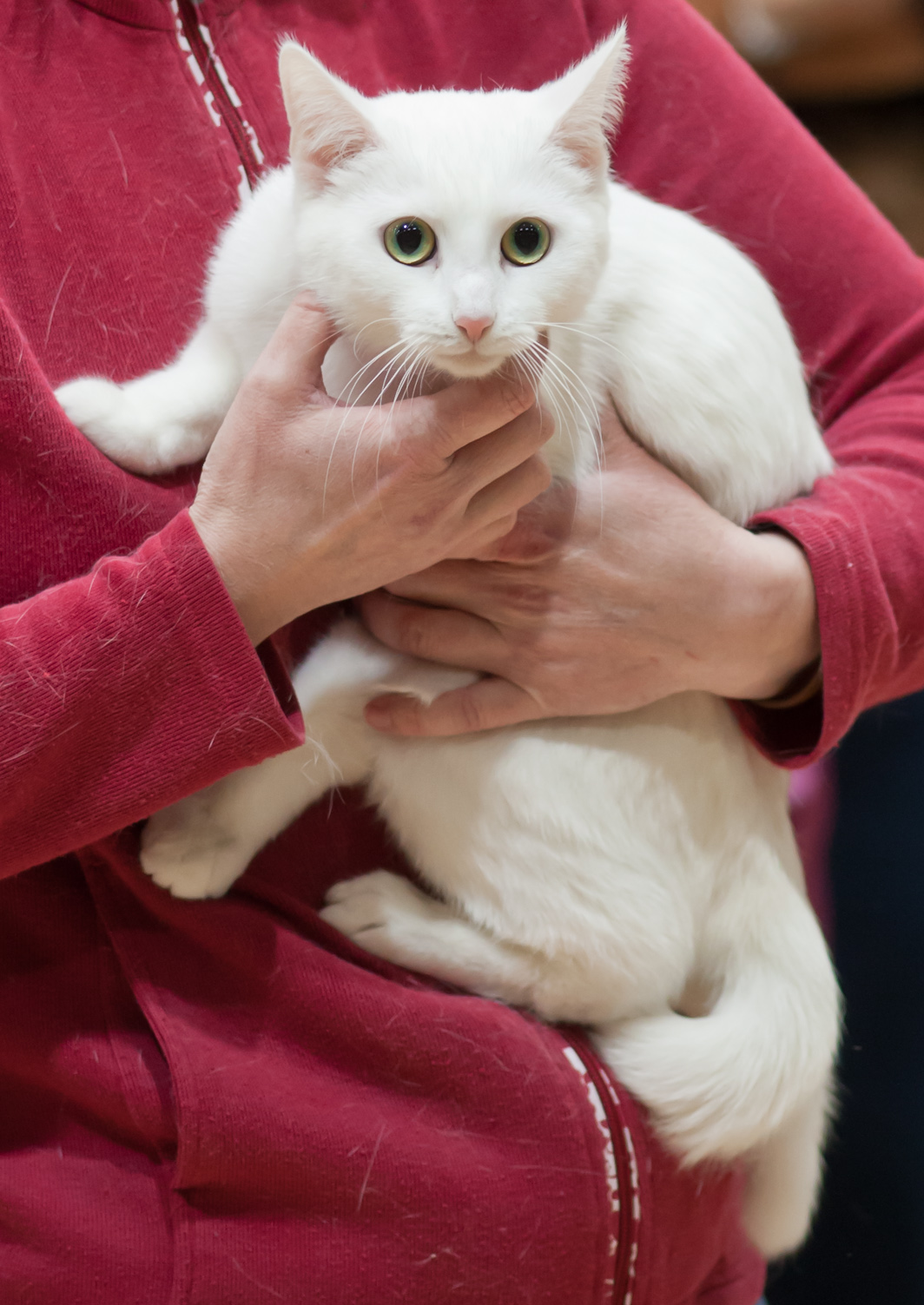
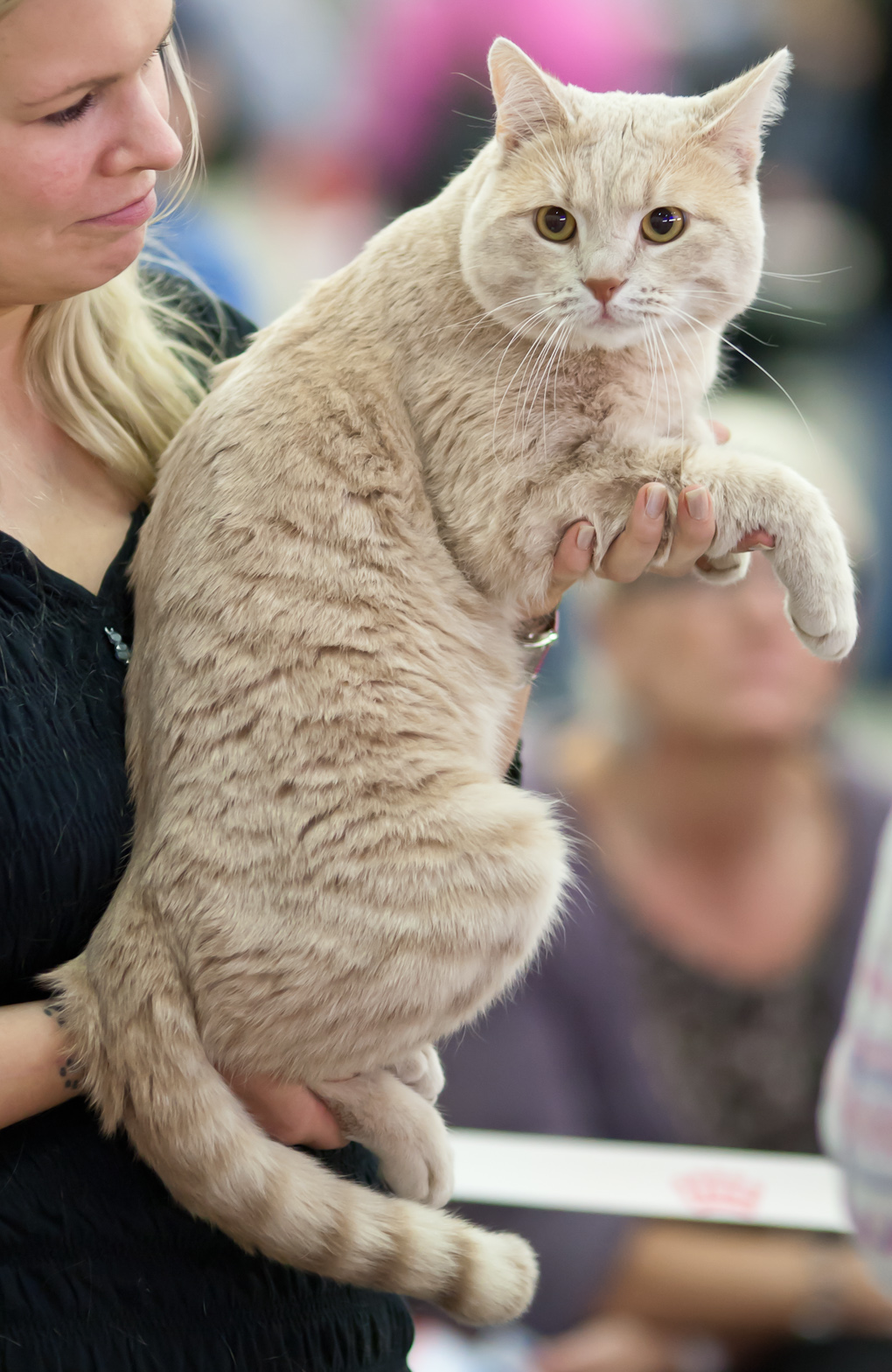
Black, white, and cream tabby European Shorthairs

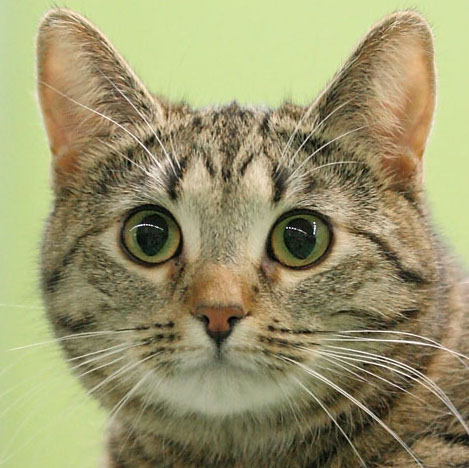
Brown tabby facial close-up

The breed resembles a domestic shorthair and is of medium size with a muscular body. The face is well rounded with well developed cheekbones. The ears are of medium size and slightly rounded at the tip. The eyes are round and open, and can be any colour including odd eyed. The neck is of medium length and muscular. The tail is of medium length, thick at the base with a rounded tip.

==== Coat ====
The European Shorthair's coat is short, dense, and glossy.

===== Coat Colour =====
All natural Western colours are permitted, such as black, blue, red, and cream, with or without tabby, tortoiseshell, silver or white spotting; though the combination of tabby with white and smoke with white is not allowed in FIFe. Solid white is also permitted. The eye colour corresponds to the coat colour and may be yellow, green or orange. Blue or odd-eyed individuals are permitted if the coat colour is white.

=== Behaviour ===
The breed has developed from the natural mouse hunters of Europe. Most European Shorthairs are strong and active, and they are generally friendly towards people of all ages. They get on well with other cats and tolerate dogs well. European Shorthairs are intelligent and playful, and most of them are adept at keeping houses and gardens free of all types of rodents.

== Health ==
In a review of over 5,000 cases of urate urolithiasis in the US the European Shorthair had the highest rate of the condition with 53 cats having the condition out of a population of 78.

== Gallery ==
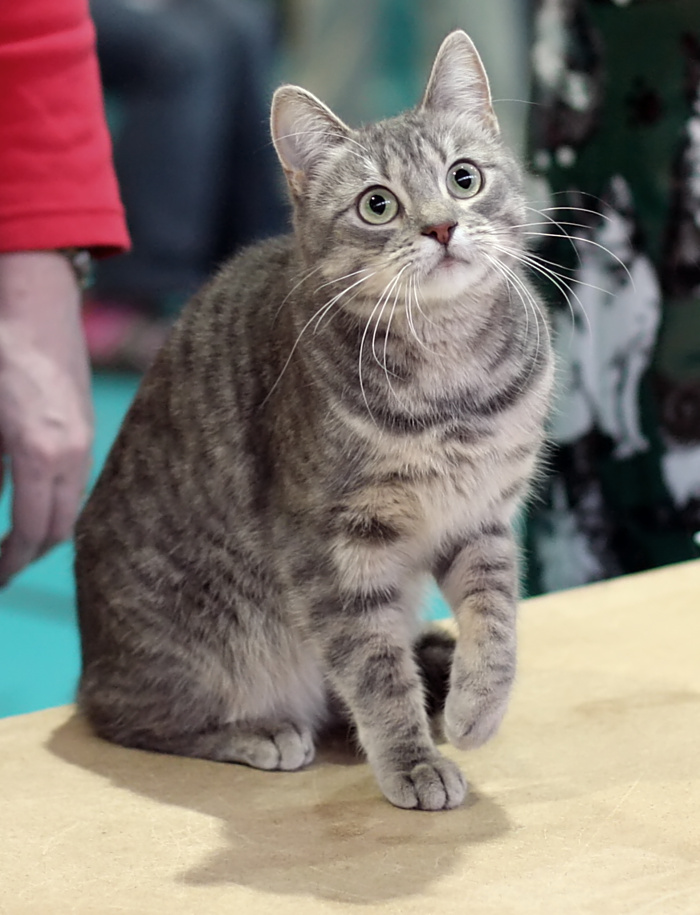
Blue mackerel tabby female

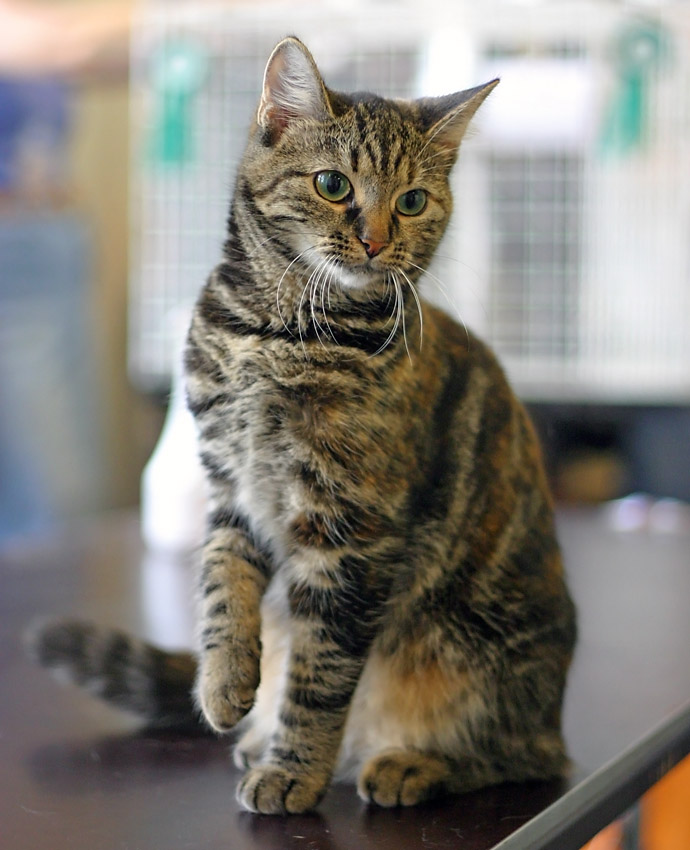
Black mackerel tabby female

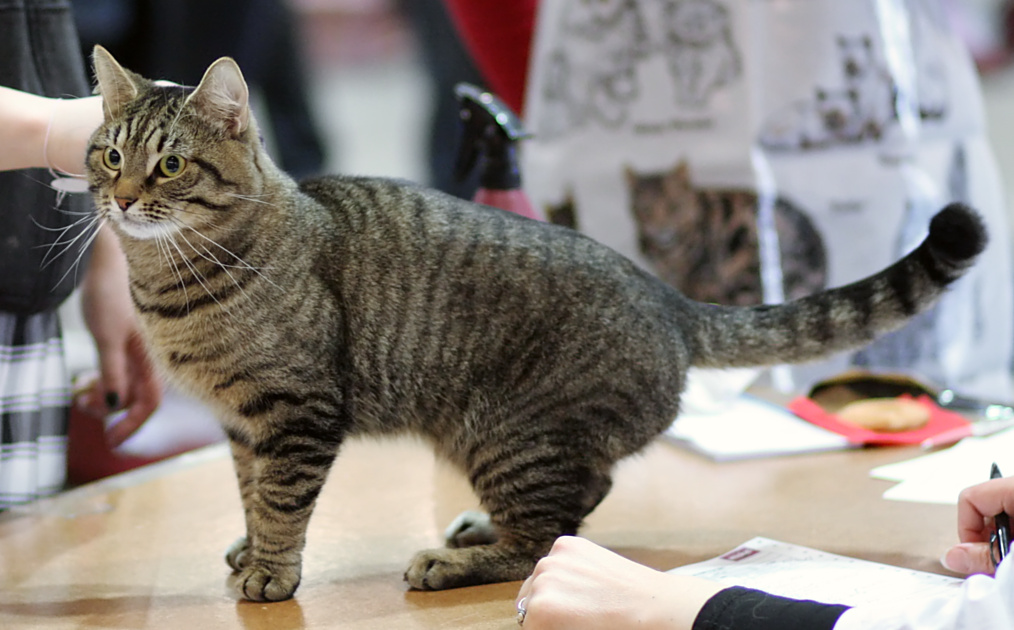
Black mackerel tabby

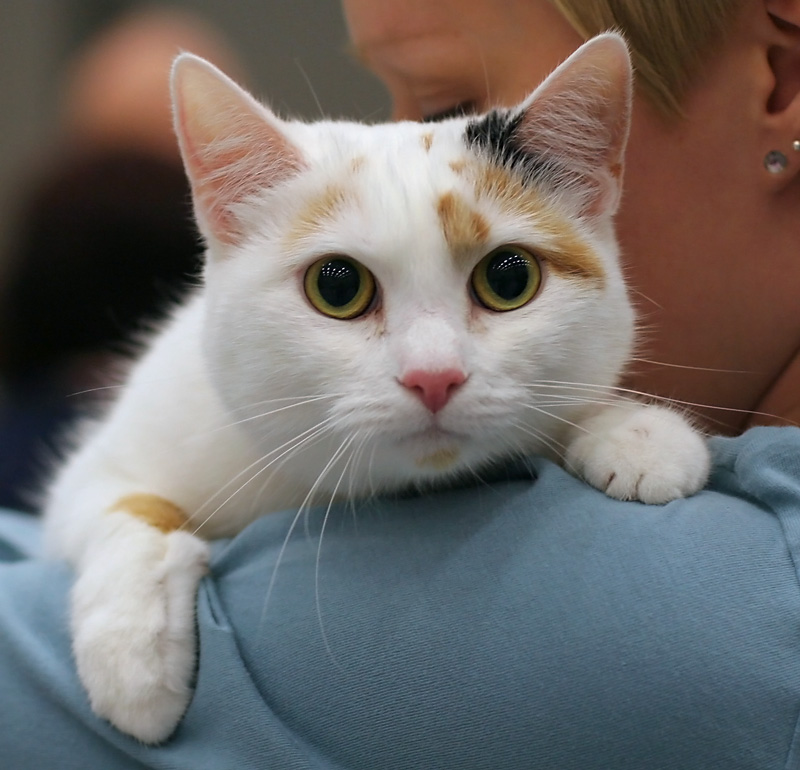
Black tortoiseshell tabby and white female

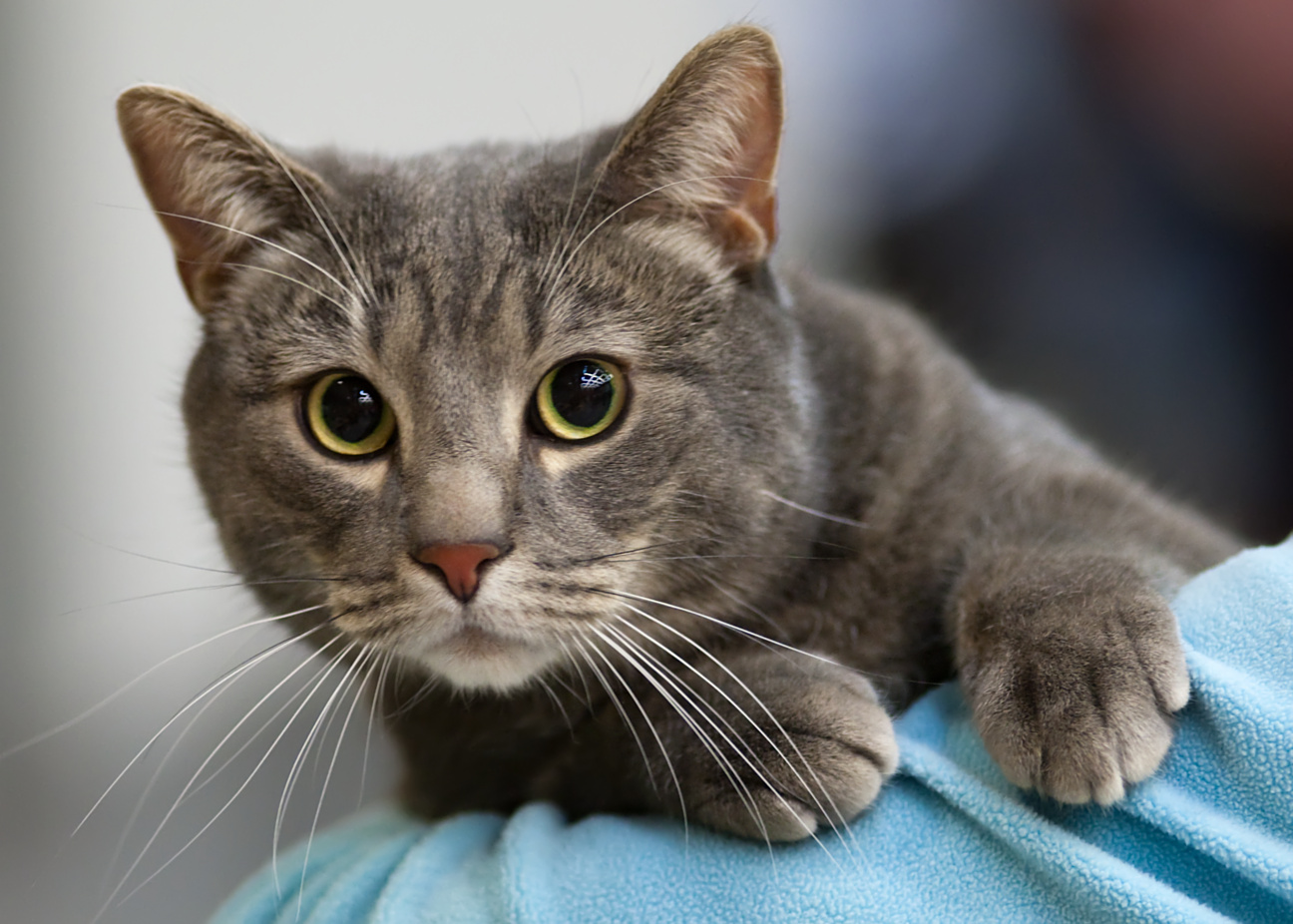
Blue tabby

== See also ==
- Moggy (Domestic short-haired cat)
- British Shorthair
