= Neva Masquerade =

Breed of domestic cat

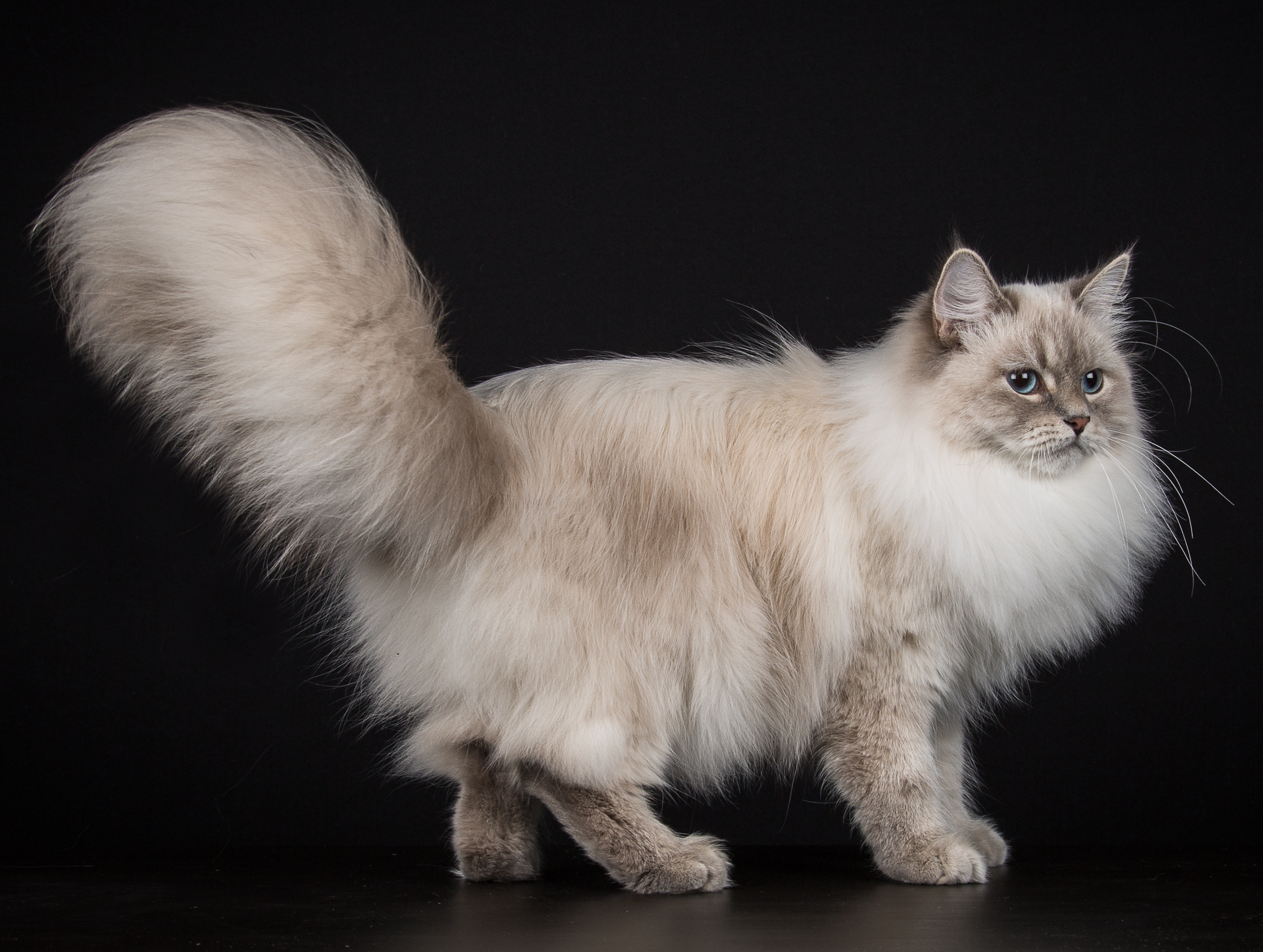
- Blue tabby point Neva Masquerade
- Origin: Russia

Breed standards
- FIFe: standard
- WCF: standard
- ACF: standard
- CCA-AFC: standard
- CCC of A: standard

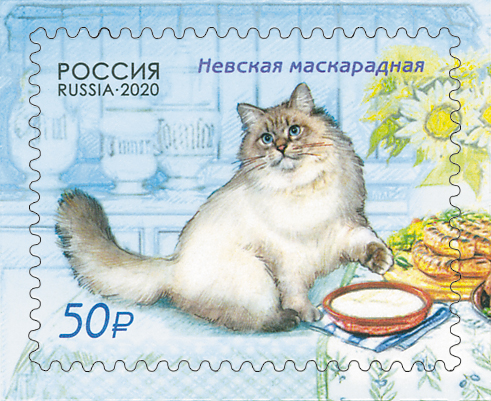
The Neva Masquerade cat on a 2020 Russian stamp.

The Neva Masquerade is a breed or sub-breed of semi-longhaired domestic cat, which originates in Russia. It is the sister breed or colourpoint variant of the Siberian cat, a pedigreed breed selectively bred from a centuries-old Russian landrace.

The colourpoint markings are the result of a colourpoint gene, originally found in Asian cats. The Neva Masquerade is believed to be derived from crossing the Siberian landrace cat with (Asian) colourpointed random-bred cats, or possibly pedigree cats related to those. The colourpoint Neva Masquerade has distinctive blue eyes and darker (tabby) point markings. It is a medium to large sized, muscular semi-longhair breed with a unique triple-coat and bushy tail.

Some cat registries classify the Neva Masquerade as a colourpoint variety or sub-breed of the Siberian cat, whilst others consider it to be a separate "sister" breed. Regardless of its classification, all Neva Masquerade cats are selectively bred and pedigreed today in all major cat fancier and breeder organisations under the Siberian (Forest) cat or Neva Masquerade. This means that all Neva Masquerade cats are purebred cats with a formally registered ancestry.

== History ==
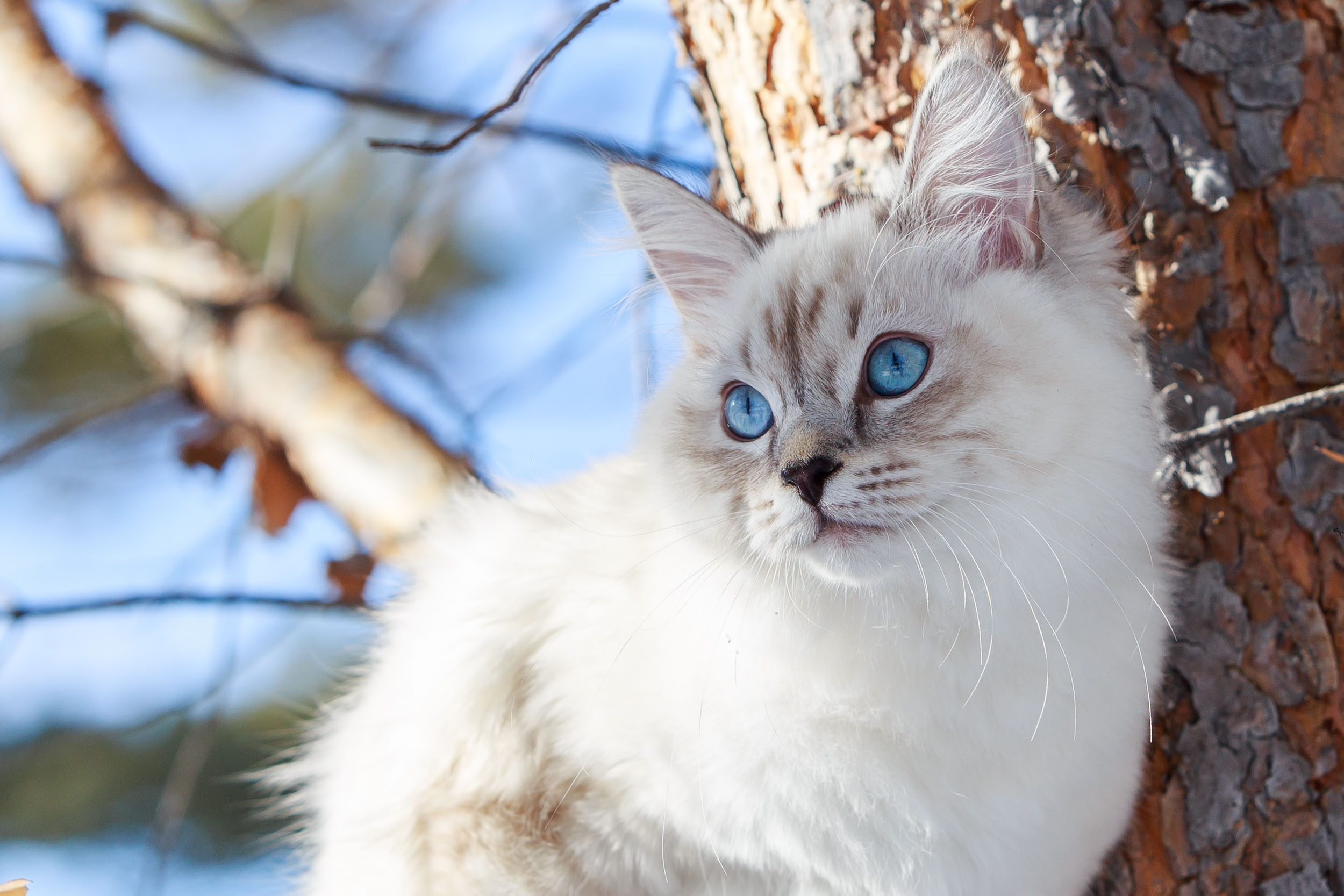
6-month-old seal tabby point kitten in a tree.

References of the ancient Siberian landrace date back a thousand years, but the colourpoint variety did not appear until the 1970–80s. It is believed that colourpointed cats of Asian origin, or their descendants, were naturally or intentionally crossed into the Siberian landrace to achieve the "Siamese" colourpoint gene.

=== Etymology ===
The term Neva Masquerade is derived from Neva, for the river in St. Petersburg, where they are said to have originated.

== Breed registration ==
During the introduction of the Siberian cat to Western European countries and the US in the late 1980s to early 2000s, the traditional coloured Siberians and colourpointed Neva Masquerade cats were both presented. The Siberian breed was recognised in 2006 by all major cat fanciers; however, some registries chose to not accept colourpoint varieties in the Siberian breed and made the Neva Masquerade into a separate breed.

Subsequently, the classification of the Neva Masquerade is a highly debated topic under breeders, enthusiasts, organisations, and (inter)national cat registries of the Siberian and Neva Masquerade cat. Some registries such as TICA and CFA accept the Neva Masquerade point colouration as being a natural coat colour within the Siberian cat breed. However, they are classified as a separate breed, the Neva Masquerade, by other registries, including FIFe, WCF, CCA-AFC, CCCA, and ACF.

== Characteristics ==
=== Colouration ===
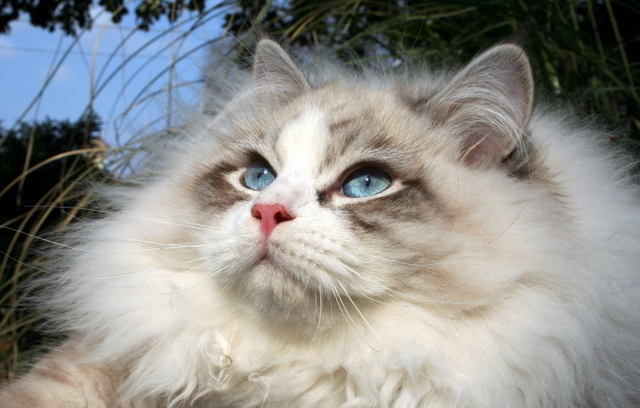
Blue-eyed adult with a seal tabby point and white coat colour.

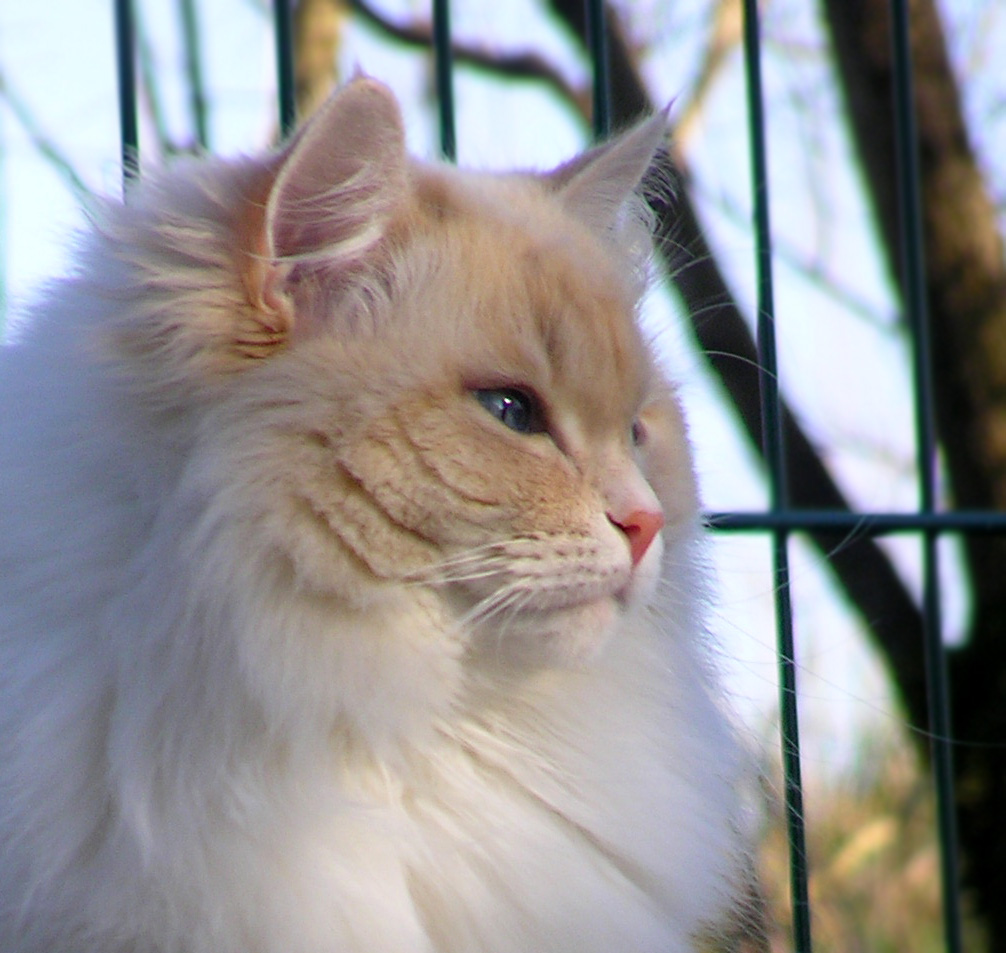
Cream tabby point adult male.

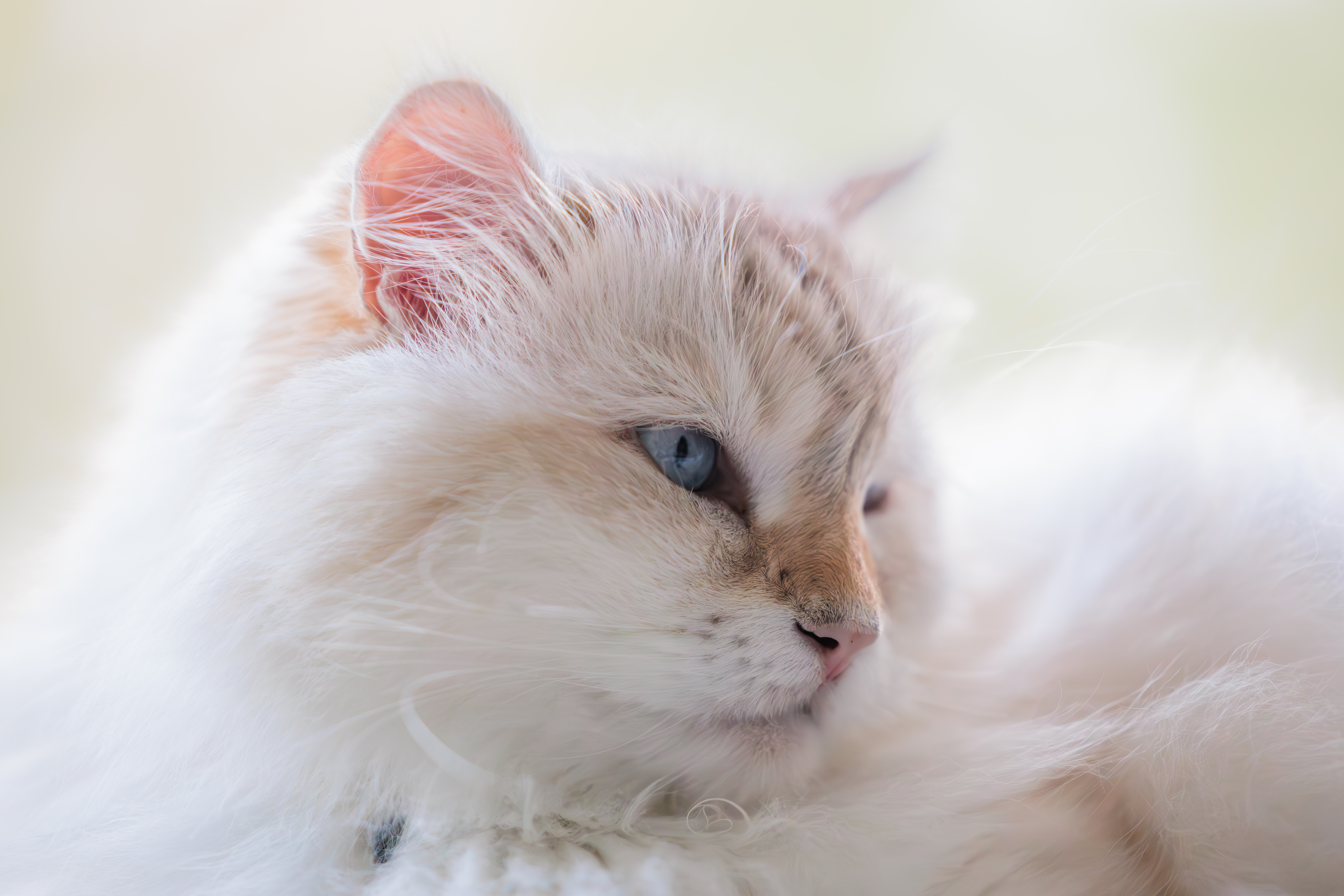
Black sunshine (golden) tabby point adult.

The colourpointed Neva Masquerade always has blue eyes, but the intensity of blue can vary. It has an overall light coat colour with darker solid or tabby point markings on its head, legs, and tail. The tabby point marking is sometimes referred to as lynx point (mostly in North America). The point colouration is allowed in the base colours:

- black ('seal', 'brown'),
- blue,
- red,
- cream.

These base colours are allowed to be combined with the following patterns and wide-band effects:

- solid or tabby,
- tortoiseshell ('tortie) or tortoiseshell tabby ('torbie'),
- silver or smoke,
- golden ('sunshine') or bimetallic ('silver sunshine'),
- any amount of white spotting.

Several cat registries do not permit the colour varieties chocolate, lilac, cinnamon, fawn, caramel, and apricot, and the colourpoint varieties sepia and mink, in the breed. All accepted colours are allowed in solid point or in combination with a tabby or tortoiseshell pattern. Any amount of white spotting is permitted. The golden and silver (incl. smoke) factors are allowed in tabby, tipped and shaded banding.

The colour intensity of the point markings spread from a light tipping to a nearly full body coverage. As with other colourpoint cats, the Neva Masquerade is nearly white at birth and develops its darker coloured markings whilst ageing. The Siamese colourpoint pattern is controlled by a heat-sensitive enzyme, which results in darker pigmented extremities on the cooler body parts, i.e. the legs, tail, and head. Colder living environments will additionally darken the fur, even as a full-grown adult.

==== Solid-white ====
These colourpoint markings can be mixed with any amount of white spotting. However, completely white (solid-white) cats are not considered Neva Masquerades, as they do not have the Siamese colourpoint marking. The solid-white colouring is considered Western, and is one of the many colours of traditional Siberian cats. Solid-white Siberian cats can also have blue eyes; however, this is due to lack of melanin pigment and not a result of the colourpoint gene. Solid-white blue-eyed cats have a higher prevalence of genetic deafness. It is advisable and in most cat registries (and certain countries) mandatory to test (BEAR- or OAE-testing) white cats for this trait before breeding with them.

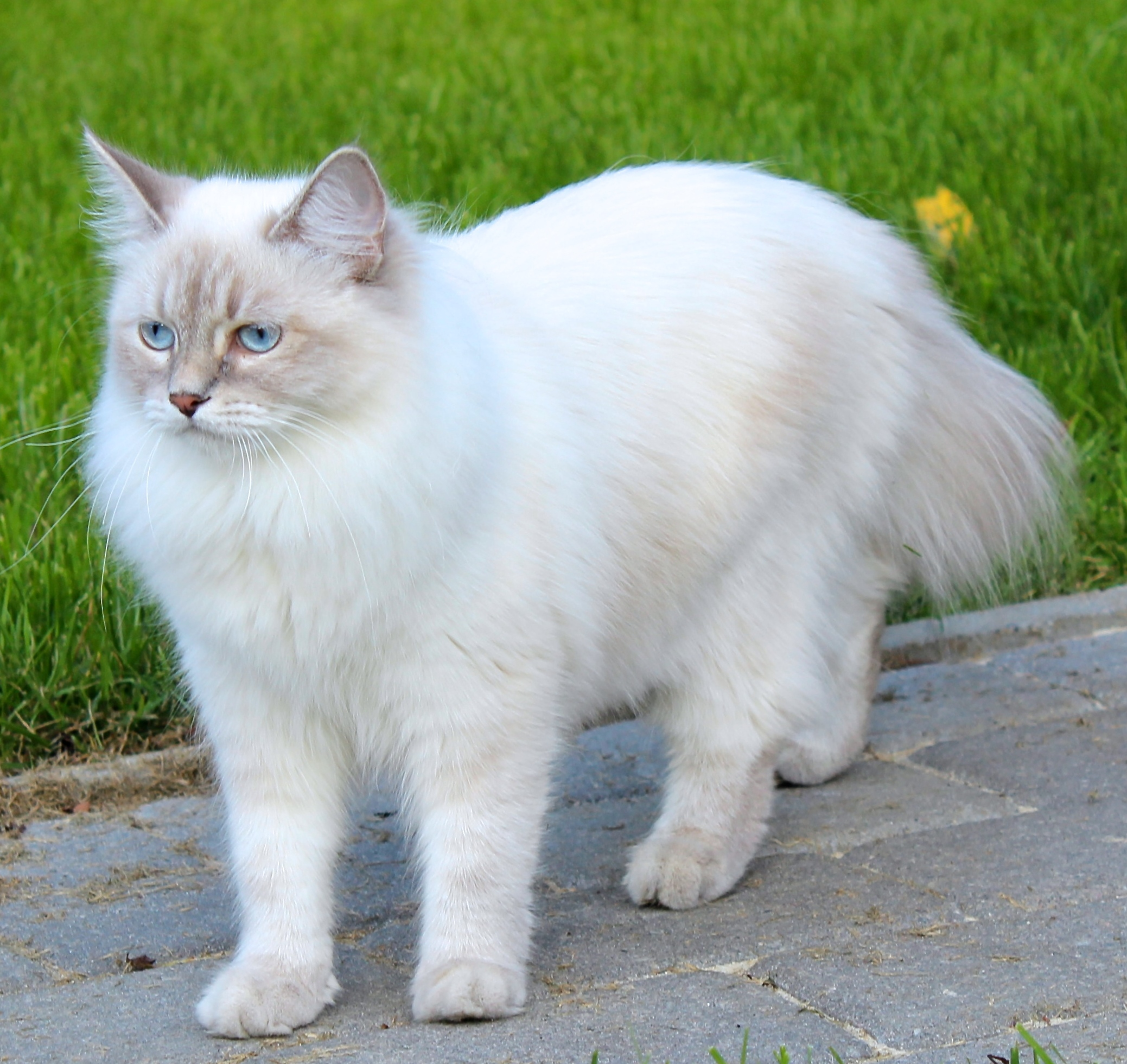
Blue tabby point adult.

=== Body ===
Known to be an exceptionally agile jumper, the Neva Masquerade is a strong and powerfully-built cat, with strong hindquarters and large, well-rounded paws. Their bushy tail is medium in length and slightly shorter than the torso length. Their body lengths varies in size from medium to large. Neva Masquerades have firm, barrel-shaped torsos, and stockier builds than other cats. The general impression of the body is one of circles and roundness.

Neva Masquerades have a slight arch to their back, because their hind legs are slightly longer than the front legs. This shape and the power in their hind legs contribute to their incredible agility and enables them to jump exceptionally high.

Neva Masquerades develop rather slowly, reaching their fully matured body at about five years of age. Female Neva Masquerades are considerably smaller than males. Full-grown adults weigh on average between 4.5–9 kg (10–20 lb).

=== Face ===
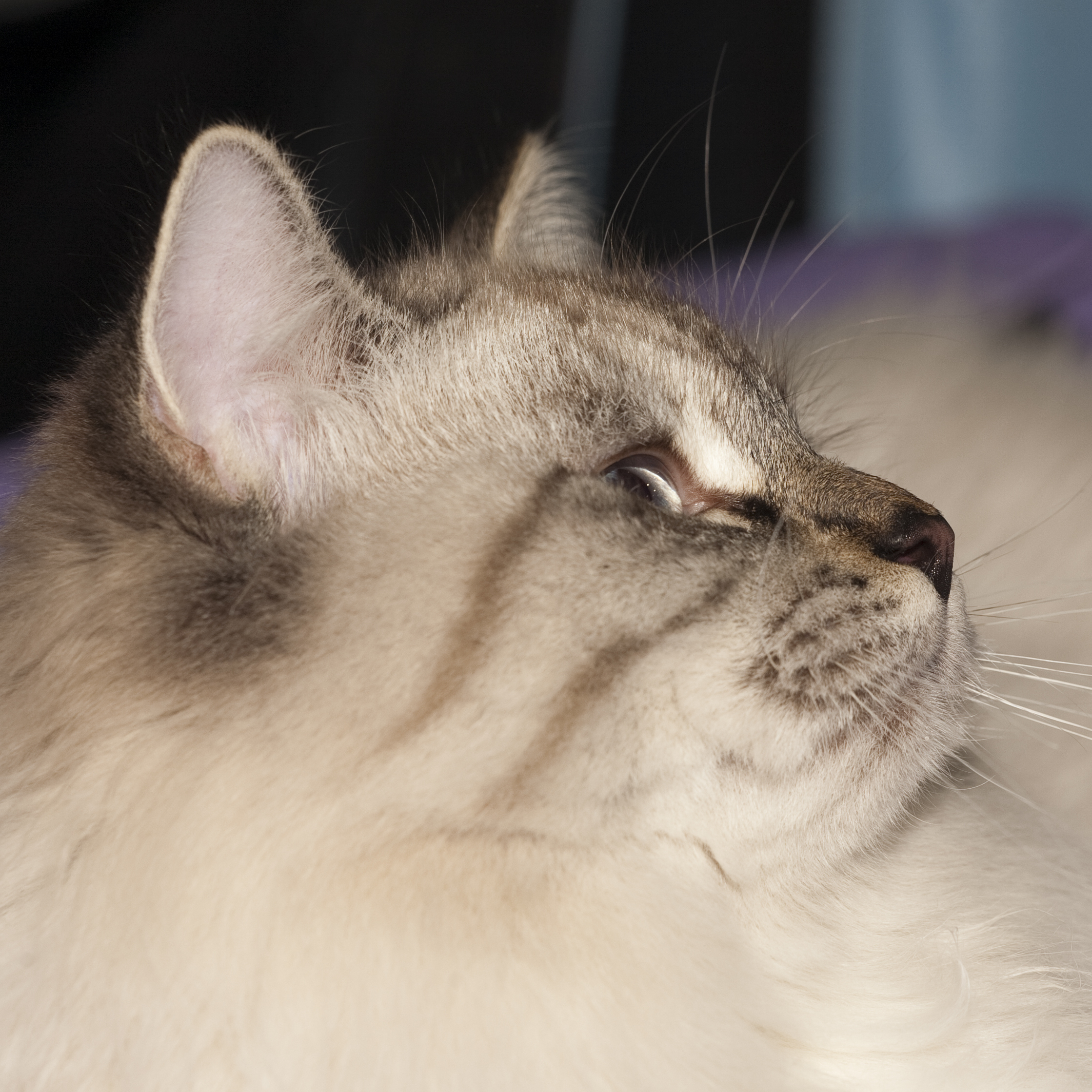
Face profile of a Neva Masquerade cat head.

The characteristic round shapes are also clearly visible in the facial features of the Neva Masquerade. Their round face consists of a broad forehead at the top of its skull and narrows slightly to a full-rounded muzzle. The eyes are large and round, and give an overall sweet expression to their face. The outer corners are slightly angled towards the base of their ears. Their medium-sized ears are broad at the base and rounded at the tip. They are slightly tilted forwards and should be set as much on the sides of the head as on top, preferably one to one and one half ear width apart. Lynx ear tipping is allowed.

=== Fur coat ===
Neva Masquerades express the three natural types of feline fur: guard hair, awn hair, and down hair. These three layers form a semi-long to long, well developed, very dense triple-coat, from which the guard hairs are water-repellent. This dense triple-coat protects the cat from the Siberian weather extremes. The thick fur is textured but glossy, and needs frequent grooming to prevent matting. The summer coat is distinctly shorter than the winter coat. Because the Neva Masquerades are a slow-maturing breed, it can take several years for the coat of young cats to fully develop.

Two Neva Masquerade adults with a very dense triple-coat walking in snow during winter.

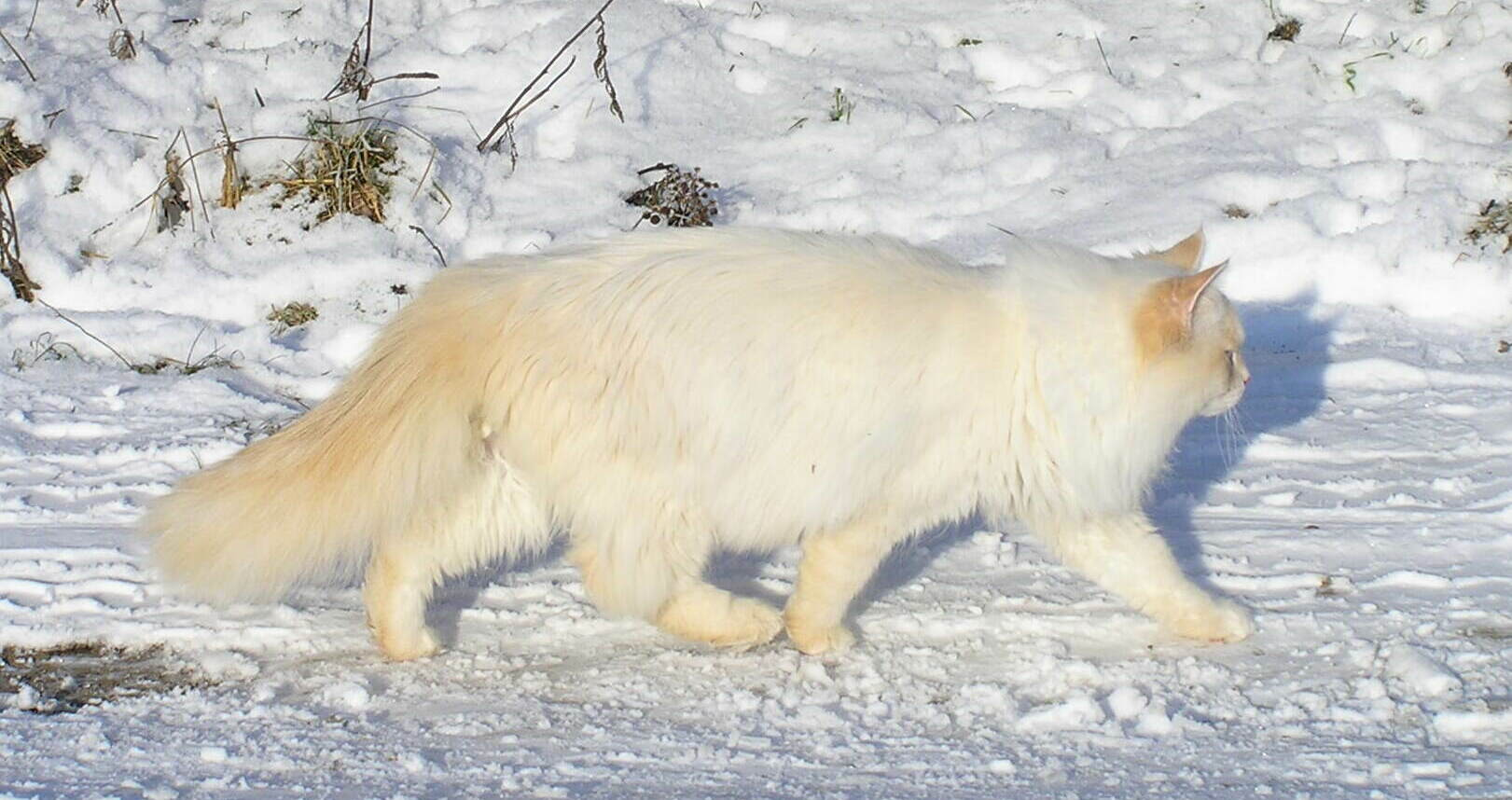
Cream tabby point

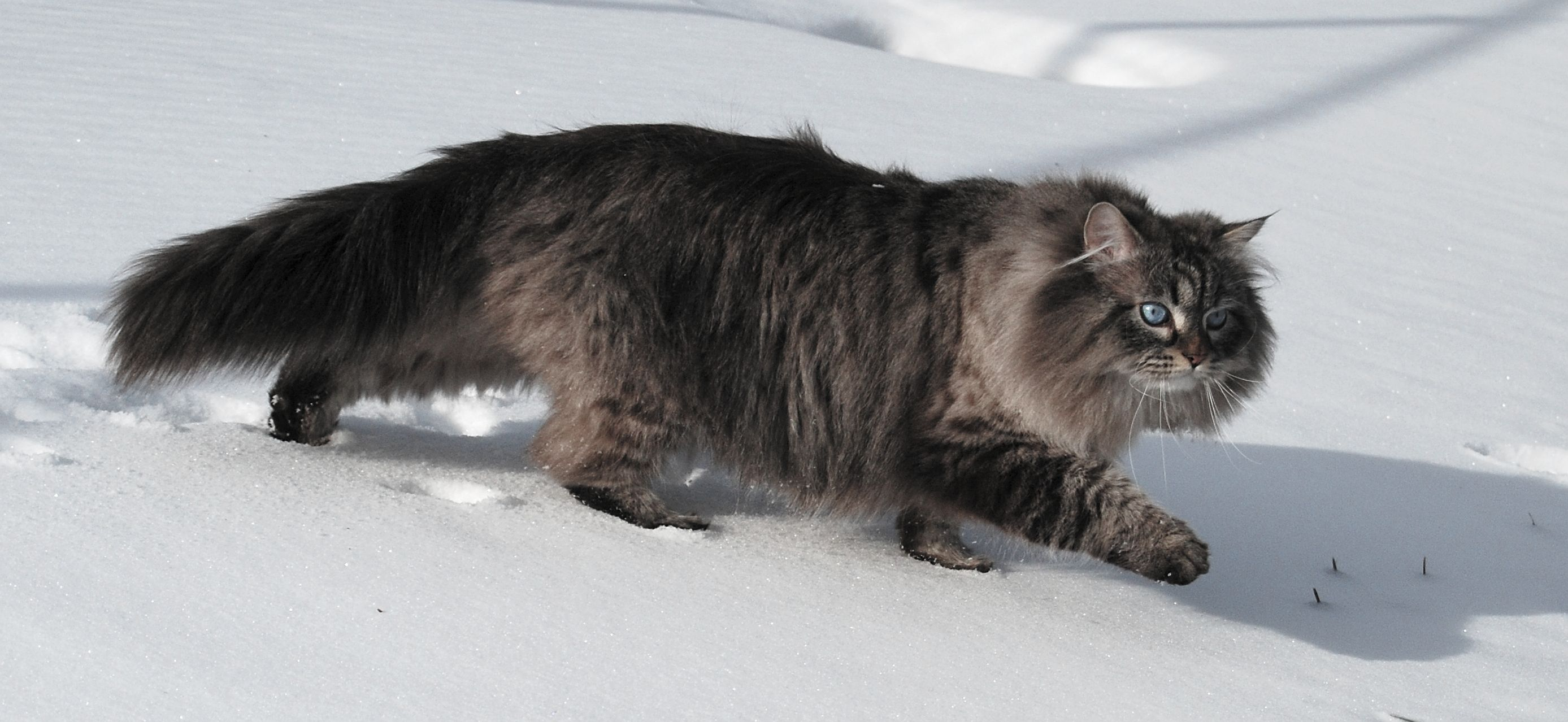
Seal tabby point

Neva Masquerade cats moult twice a year. They will shed their heavy winter coat during spring. This winter moult is instigated not by a change in temperature but by a change in day length. Many Neva Masquerades will experience a less intense "mini-moult" at the end of the summer season to prepare for their thick winter coat, unlike other cats, which will experience a "heavy moult" more than twice a year. However, they will still lose fur year-round and need to be groomed daily in order to prevent their dense triple coat from matting.

== Genetics ==
Similar to the Siberian, the Neva Masquerade has been noted for its hypoallergenic properties primarily attributed to lower levels of the Fel d 1 protein.

=== Colourpoint gene ===
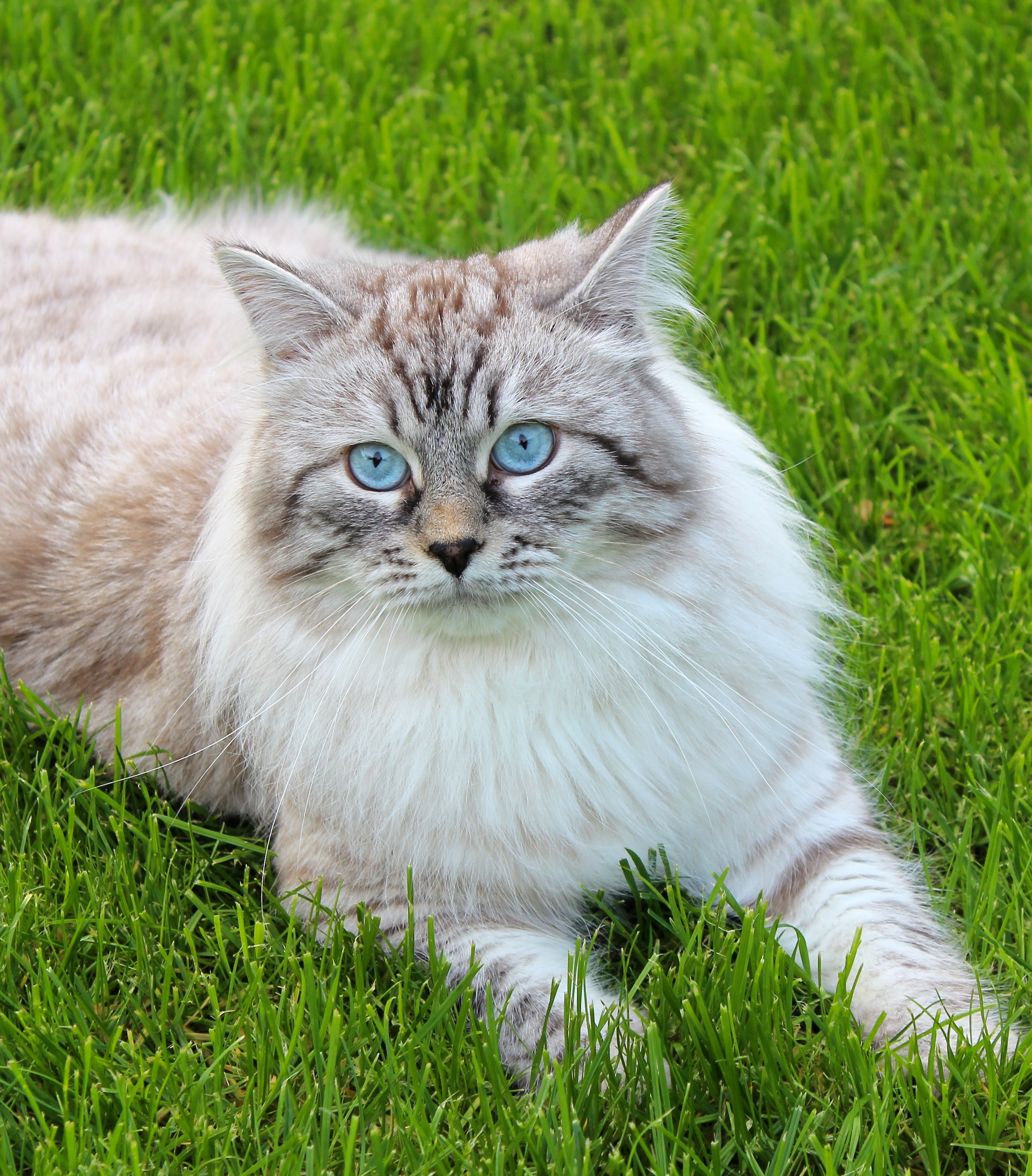
Seal tabby point adult.

The Neva Masquerade carries the same colourpoint gene (c.904G>A, a variant of the TYR gene) as the Siamese, which can also be found in other cat breeds related to the Siamese, namely the Birman, Himalayan (colourpoint Persian), Ragdoll and Toybob, and non-pedigreed domestic cats. This Siamese-type colourpoint mutation provides the distinctive dark point markings and bright blue eyes in Neva Masquerade cats. The gene pool of the Siberian and the Neva Masquerade share a significant overlap, as the two have been crossbred for many years. Nowadays, commercial tests exists for point mutations, which allows breeders to specifically target carriers of the popular point gene.

== Differences with Siberian cats ==
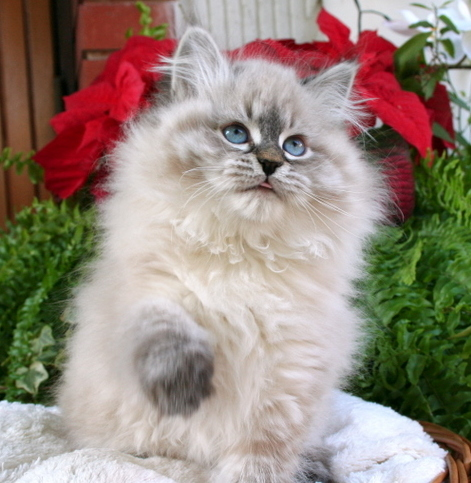
12-weeks-old seal tabby point kitten

Although the Neva Masquerade shares many characteristics with the Siberian in terms of character and appearance, recent studies have shown distinctions between the two in terms of body language, vocalisations, and feline hereditary diseases.

Research on the body language and vocalisation of the two sister breeds showed that Neva Masquerade cats behaved more stressed and fearful in isolation compared to Siberian cats. The vocalisation of Siberian cats is spread over a broader energy spectrum than the Neva Masquerade, which probably results in more diverse sounds in the Siberian cat.

Polycystic kidney disease (PKD) is a feline heredity disease, which is highly prevalent in the Persian cat gene pool. The heredity disease has not been found in the gene pool of traditional Siberians; however, it was diagnosed in a male Neva Masquerade. Genetic analysis confirmed the inherited pattern of PKD in its relatives. The origin of the Neva Masquerade is unclear, and some believe it is related to the Himalayan (colourpoint Persian) cat, which may explain the prevalence of PKD in this breed. PKD should be considered as a possible cause of chronic renal failure in this breed.

These differences between the two sister breeds seem surprising, as they are treated as one breed by many cat enthusiasts and are allowed to be mixed with each other by most breeding registries. Further studies are needed, as these study results are just the beginning of the research on the two sister breeds. Especially, the prevalence of PKD in the Neva Masquerade gene pool is of concern as crossbreeding the two sister breeds could potentially spread PKD into the Siberian breed.

== Health ==
Hypertrophic Cardiomyopathy (HCM) stands as a significant health concern in the feline world, particularly in Siberian cats. HCM is characterised by the thickening of the heart's muscle walls which can lead to various complications including heart failure, arterial thromboembolism and sudden death.
