= Siberian cat =

Breed of domestic cat

Siberian
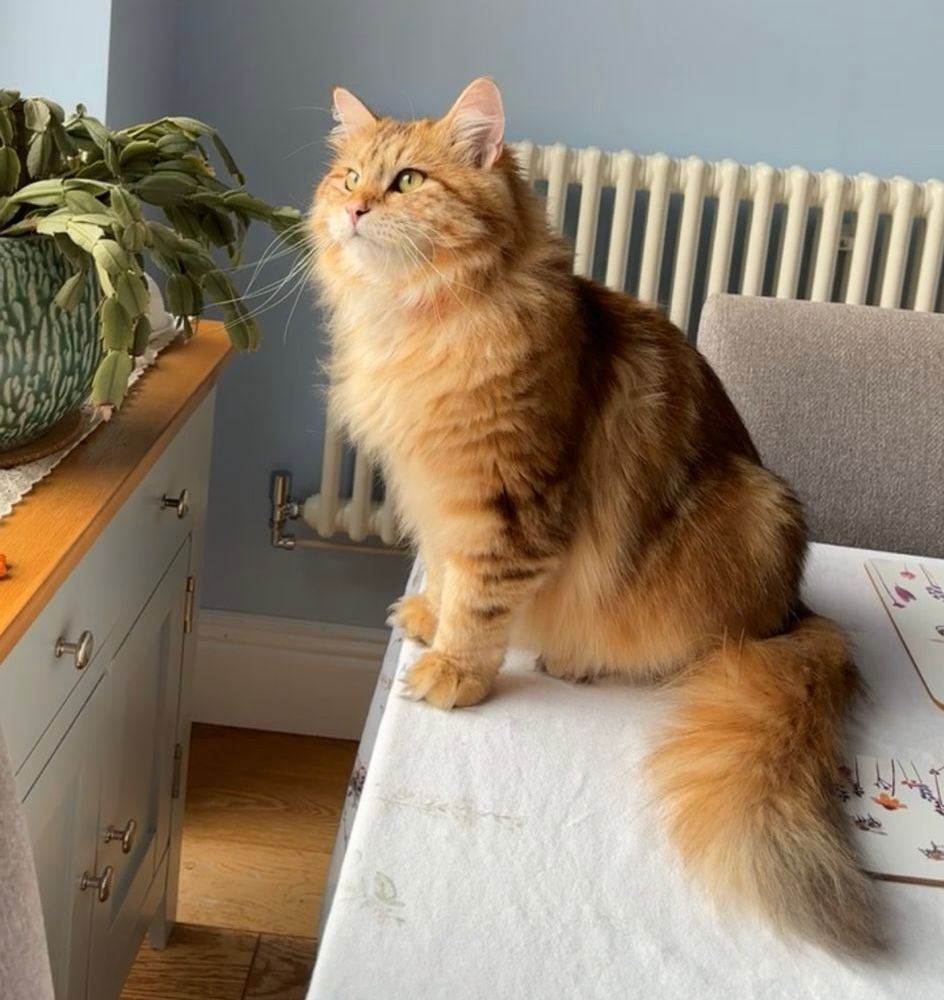
- Black Sunshine Tabby Adult Female Cat
- Other names: Siberian Forest Cat; Moscow Semi-longhair
- Origin: Russia

Breed standards
- CFA: standard
- FIFe: standard
- TICA: standard
- WCF: standard
- FFE: standard
- ACF: standard
- ACFA/CAA: standard
- CCA-AFC: standard
- GCCF: standard
- LOOF: standard
- NZCF: standard
- SACC: standard

The Siberian is a centuries-old landrace (natural variety) of domestic cat in Russia, and recently developed as a formal breed with standards promulgated the world over since the late-1980s. Since 2006, the breed is recognised for registry and championship status with all major cat registries.

The formal name of the breed is Siberian Forest Cat, but it is typically referred to as the Siberian or Siberian cat. Formerly, sometimes the names Moscow Semi-Longhair and Russian Longhair were also used. The colourpoint variant or sister breed, called the Neva Masquerade, is categorised as a separate cat breed by some registries, including FIFe, WCF, and ACF.

The breed developed from an ancient, natural landrace from Siberia, and is the national cat of Russia. While it began as a landrace, Siberians are selectively-bred and pedigreed in all major cat fancier and breeder organisations. This means that all Siberian cats are purebred cats with a formally registered ancestry. It is a medium- to large-sized, muscular breed with a bushy tail.

The Siberian is often called hypoallergenic because it produces less Fel d 1 than other cat breeds. A research study of Siberian cats native to the area of Russia from which the breed stock originated confirmed the subjects produced less Fel d 1 (the strongest among the eight known Fel d 1 allergens produced in cat saliva, which is deposited on their fur when they groom themselves) than non-Siberian cats.

== History ==
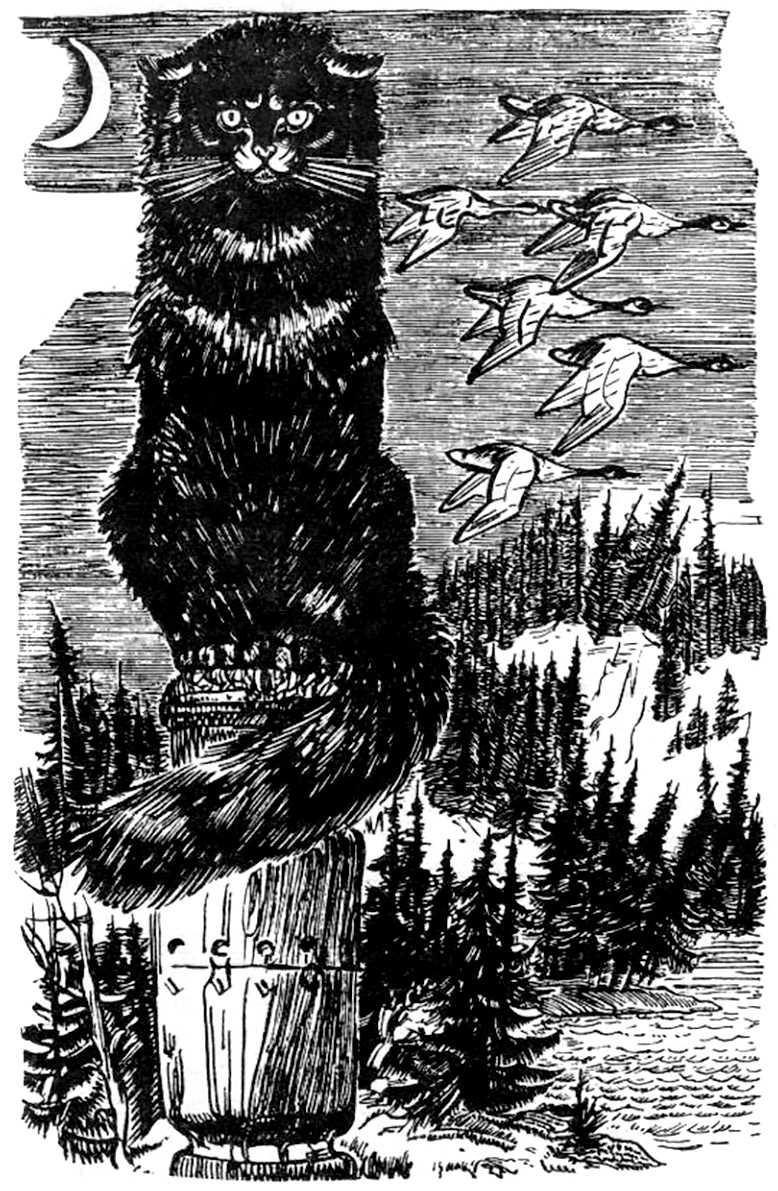
Drawing of the Russian folktale character Cat Bayun, a large and hairy cat living in the forests of Siberia

Siberian landrace cats are Russia's native forest cats and are known to have existed for a long time in the dense forests of Siberia, appearing in records of Slavic folktales, rural lore, and artwork dating back to the 10th century. It was long speculated by cat experts that the ancient breed was the distant ancestor of all modern-day long-haired breeds. However, phylogenetic studies showed that for example Maine Coon cats are descendants of British cats brought to New England by Puritan settlers. It is not relatedness that makes them look similar to the Siberian, but convergent evolution. These breeds all formed in harsh climates in which natural selection pressures for similar qualities. However, Siberians are genetically closely related to Norwegian Forest cats and the random-bred Northern European cat populations.

=== First introduction to the world ===
Outside of Russia, the Siberian cat was first mentioned in the 1864 edition of the German book Brehms Tierleben, where Brehm describes a long-haired cat breed as "a red Tobolsk cat from Siberia" (eine rote Tobolsker Katze aus Sibirien).

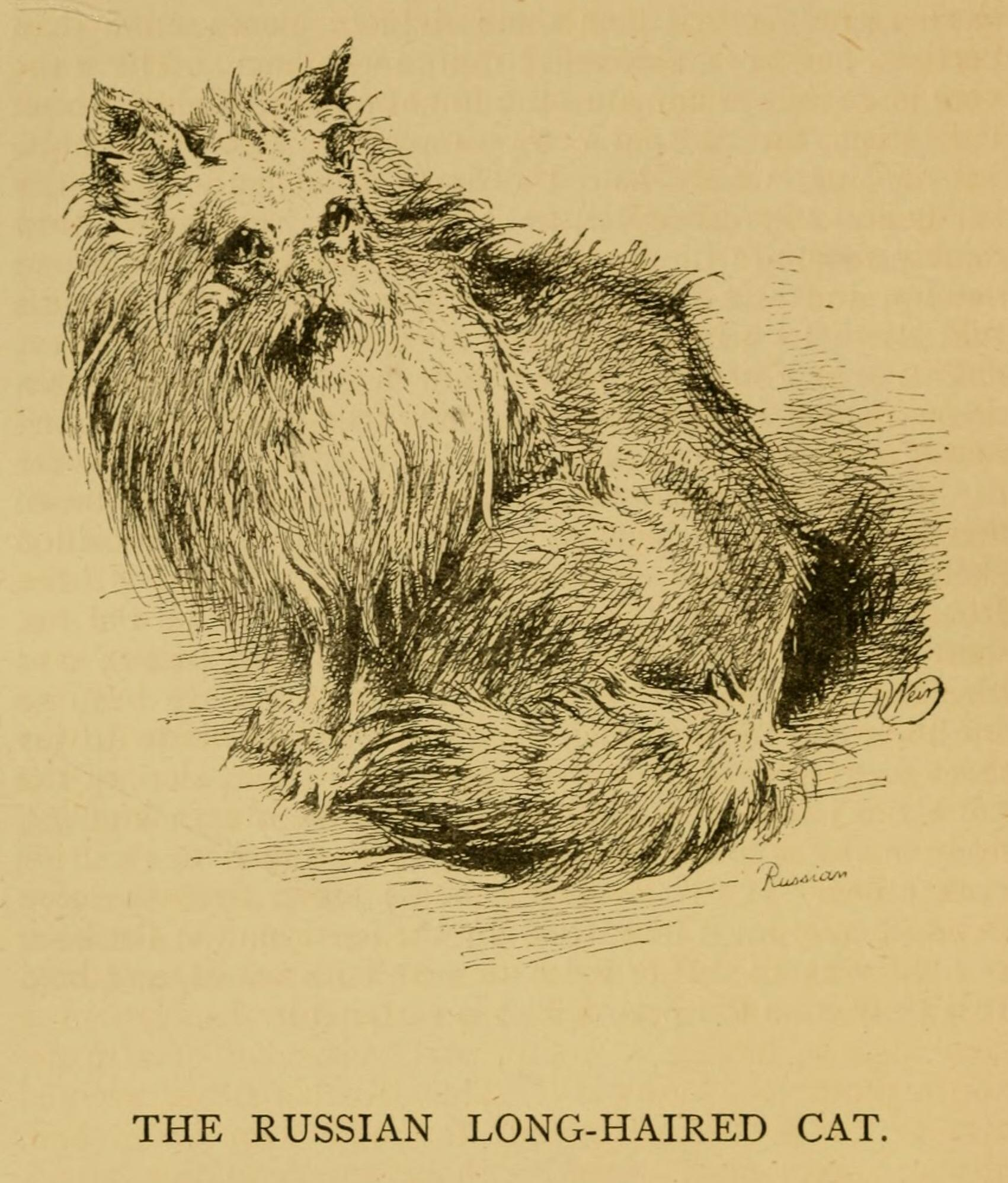
Drawing of the "Russian long-haired Cat" in Weir's book Our Cats and All About Them (1892)

Later in 1889 and 1892, the Siberian cat was again mentioned in the two editions of a book by Harrison Weir, who organised and wrote about some of the earliest cat shows in England in 1871. The Siberian cat is described in the book under its former name, the "Russian Long-haired Cat". However, in the preface of the 1892 edition, Weir also mentions a cat he refers to as a "Siberian Cat":

I have been shown a Siberian Cat, by Mr. Castang, of Leadenhall Market; the breed is entirely new to me. It is a small female Cat of a slaty-blue colour, rather short in body and legs; the head is small and much rounded, while the ears are of medium size. The iris of the eyes is a deep golden colour, which, in contrast to the bluish colour of the fur, makes them to appear still more brilliant; the tail is short and thick, very much so at the base, and suddenly pointed at the tip. It is particularly timid and wild in its nature, and is difficult to approach; but, as Mr. Castang observed, this timidity may be "because it does not understand our language and does not know when it is called or spoken to."

During this first introduction of the Siberian to the West, the cat was often still known as the "Russian Longhair". These cats were crossed with other popular long-haired breeds, and the separate identity was soon lost.

=== Second introduction to the world ===
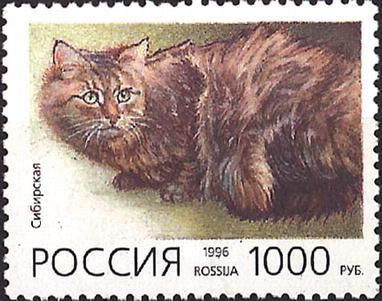
Russia's national cat, the Siberian cat, on a 1996 Russian stamp.

Due to the fall of the Berlin Wall and the dissolution of the Soviet Union, a second wave of Siberian cats were introduced to the rest of the world and an officially acknowledged cat breed was developed. In 1987, a young male and female were taken from St. Petersburg to Berlin by a cat enthusiast, who started a serious breeding program with registration under the name 'Siberian Forest Cat' or 'Siberian Cat'. Since that success, there has been an increase in interest in the Siberian breed within Russia itself.

In the Russian cat fancy, each cat club devises its own cat standards. This fact led to much confusion in other countries when the first Siberians were arriving and many appeared quite different from each other, depending on what area of Russia they originated from. One of the earliest written Siberian breed standards was published by the Kotofei Cat Club in St. Petersburg in 1987 under the name Siberian cat (Russian: Сибирская кошка, Sibirskaya koshka or Sibirskaja koschka).

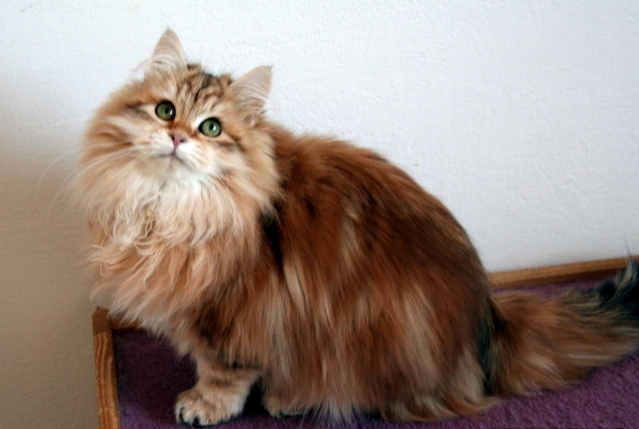
Black sunshine tabby adult

Officially registered Siberians first arrived in the USA in 1990, and in the UK in 2002. During the early 1990s, it was expensive and difficult to locate and import Siberians from Eastern Europe. Therefore, inbreeding in registered purebred Siberians became common in certain regions after the breed's introduction. Because the breed is relatively new to registration and breed books are open, breeders are able to add foundation stock from Russia to the breed. This reduces the level of relatedness within the breed, and increases vigour in the breed. Although gaining in popularity since the 2020s, the expense of importing the cats from Eastern Europe, and the common breeder's practice of early neutering pedigree kittens, keeps the breed still relatively rare outside of Eastern Europe.

== Breed registration ==
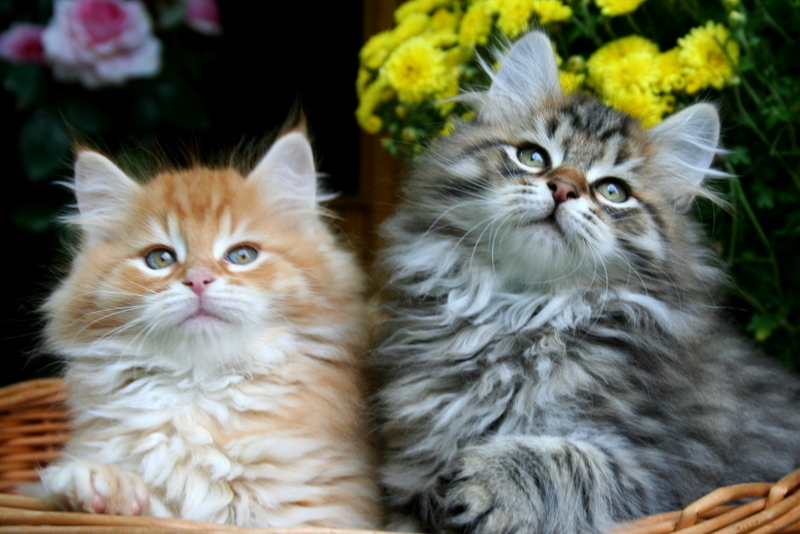
Red and black tabby kittens

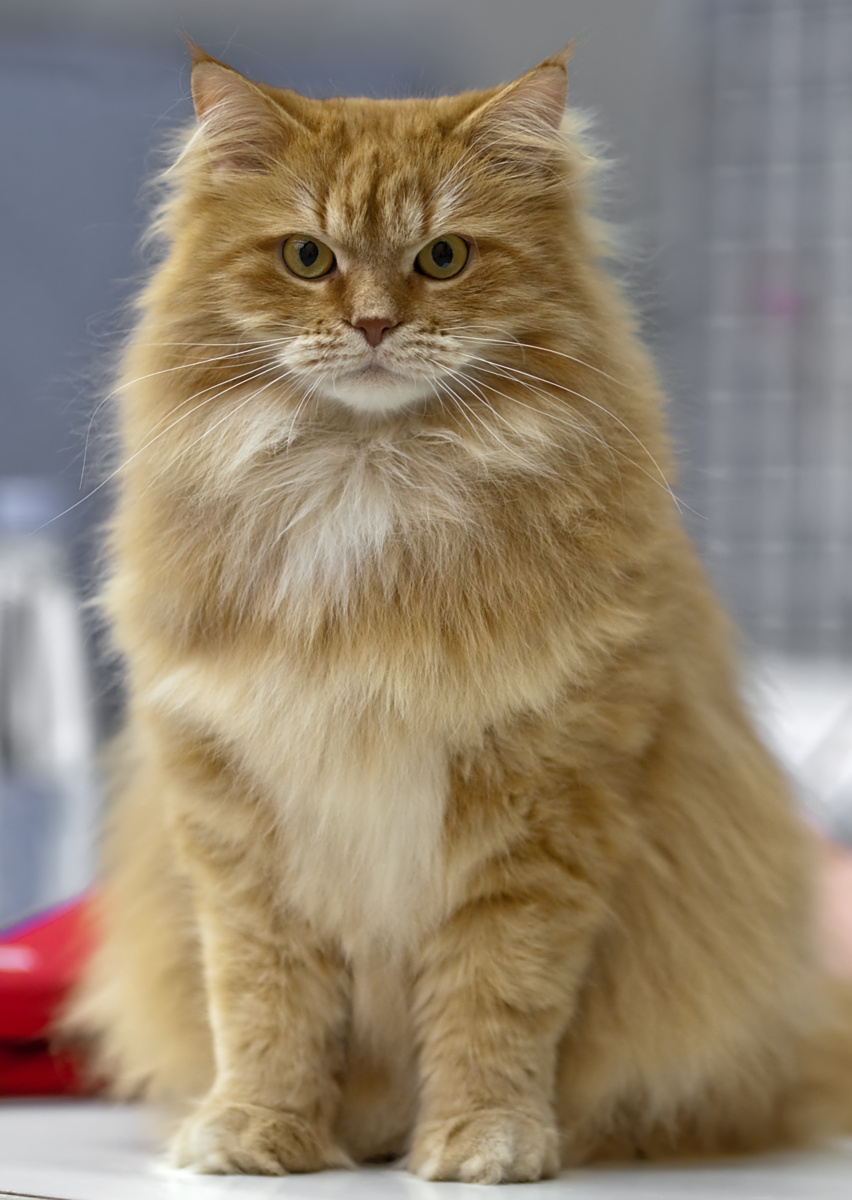
Red tabby at a FIFe cat show (Turku, 2010)

=== Registry ===
Nowadays, all Siberian and Neva Masquerade cats are selectively bred and pedigreed in all major cat registries under the category 'Siberian (Forest) Cat', or in several registries under 'Neva Masquerade' for the colourpoint sister breed. Similar to other officially recognised cat breeds, the term "Siberian" is only meant to be used for cats from this specific breed, which are by definition all purebred cats with a known and formally registered ancestry, also known as the cat's pedigree "paperwork". The purpose of the registry of Siberian cats is to develop and maintain a healthy cat breed by controlling inbreeding and the spread of hereditary diseases, and regulating the well-being of the cats. Unregistered cats with a similar appearance as the Siberian cat are referred to as domestic long-haired cats.

Each of the (inter)national cat registries applies breed standards, which cover a description of the ideal characteristics specific to the Siberian breed. In general, Siberian kittens will grow up to be a representative of this ideal breed standard in both looks and character. Consequently, these breed standards represent the phenotype of the Siberian breed and may include criteria of physical and morphological appearance, genetics, and of athletic or productive performance. In cat shows, Siberian cats will be compared with and judged after these breed standards based on a point system. Faults or disqualifications are given to show cats with medical disorders, uncharacteristic traits, or cats that lack in well-being and proper care from their owners.

=== Recognition ===
After its introduction worldwide in the late-1980s, it took nearly two decades for the breed to be accepted for registry and championship status with all major international cat registries in 2006. In 1991, the WCF was the first international registry to admit a breed standard of the Siberian, based on the Russian standard. TICA accepted the breed into their 'New Breed program' in 1992, and in 1996 granted them championship status. In 1997, the breed was recognised by FIFe, and since 2011 the Neva Masquerade officially split off as a separate breed. The Siberian was accepted for registration (under 'Miscellaneous') by CFA in 2000, and advanced to championship status in 2006. The GCCF has recognised the breed for registry since 2004.

=== Popularity ===
Even though the Siberian was introduced outside Russia in the late-1980s, it wasn't until the mid-2010s that the Siberian breed started to gain in popularity. Especially at the beginning of the 2020s, the popularity of the Siberian rapidly increased worldwide. As a result, the Siberian cat has secured a place among the top 10 most popular breeds in various cat registries, now representing approximately 0–5% of all pedigree cats worldwide, and is particularly popular in Europe. (Note: Popularity of Siberian cats (incl. Neva Masquerades) in the GCCF (predominantly UK): Year / registered Siberian cats; 2004 / 101; 2010 / 138; 2011 / 147; 2012 / 157; 2013 / 190; 2014 / 194; 2015 / 244; 2016 / 300; 2017 / 260; 2018 / 320; 2019 / 267; 2020 / 358; 2021 / 344; 2022 / 371; Since 2004, the breed has been recognised for registry with the GCCF (predominantly in the UK). By 2022, the Siberian cat (incl. NM) was the 9th most registered cat breed in the GCCF, while in 2012 it was still in 20th place, and in 2017 in 15th place. In FIFe, which is primarily active in Europe but operates in 42 countries worldwide, both the Siberian and Neva Masquerade (NM) cat breeds gained notable popularity. In 2023, the Siberian breed ranked as the 4th most popular, comprising 4,4% of all registered kittens that year, which translates to 4.538 cats. The NM followed closely at 9th place, accounting for 2,8% with 2.835 registered kittens that same year. In the FIFe 2024 statistics, 3.147 kittens —representing approx. 3,3% of their total registrations— were registered, ranking them at position 8th. The NM was at the 9th position with 2.977 or 3,1% of all registered kittens. In comparison, in 2019, the Siberian breed held the 6th position with 4,5% (4.466 cats), whilst the NM was 11th with 2,3% (2.273 cats) of registrations. The LOOF serves as the national registry for all pedigreed cats in France, including those imported from other countries. Between 2003 and 2022, Siberian cats (incl. NM) accounted for 4,27% of all registered cats. Their numbers have seen significant growth over the years, starting with just 32 Siberian cats in 2003. This figure increased to 215 by 2010, soared to 903 in 2015, and ultimately reached 2.737 by 2022. Making it the 6th most popular breed in France in the year 2022, and 10th over the total 2003–2022 period. Similar to the popularity seen in the (primarily) European registry numbers, the Siberian (incl. NM) is also growing in popularity in the CFA (active in the USA). In 2017, the Siberian was the 15th most registered cat breed in the CFA, while in 2012 it was still in the 18th place. Since the 2020s, the Siberian gained worldwide in popularity. It jumped from the 15th place in 2020, to the 11th place in 2021, and made it in 2022 for the first time to the top 10 at the number 10 spot. In 2022, there were 152 Siberian (incl. NM) breeders out of the 42.864 breeders registered in TICA, predominantly in the USA and Canada. In 2023, there were 55 Siberian breeders out of the 76.682 breeders registered with FIFe, predominantly in Europe. The number of these breeders only represents the ones, which use the word "Siberia", "Siberian" or "Syberian" in their cattery name. In September 2023, there were a total of 40.700 (incl. deceased) Siberian and NM cats registered with the worldwide PawPeds, the biggest cat pedigree database worldwide and used by breeders to increase genetic variation and prevent the spread of hereditary diseases in pedigree cats. Out of the total 40.700 cats, 33.500 were born after 2000. Half of these cats (17.000) were born between January 2015 and September 2023, again showing the rapid increase in popularity after the mid-2010s of the Siberian breed.)

== Description ==
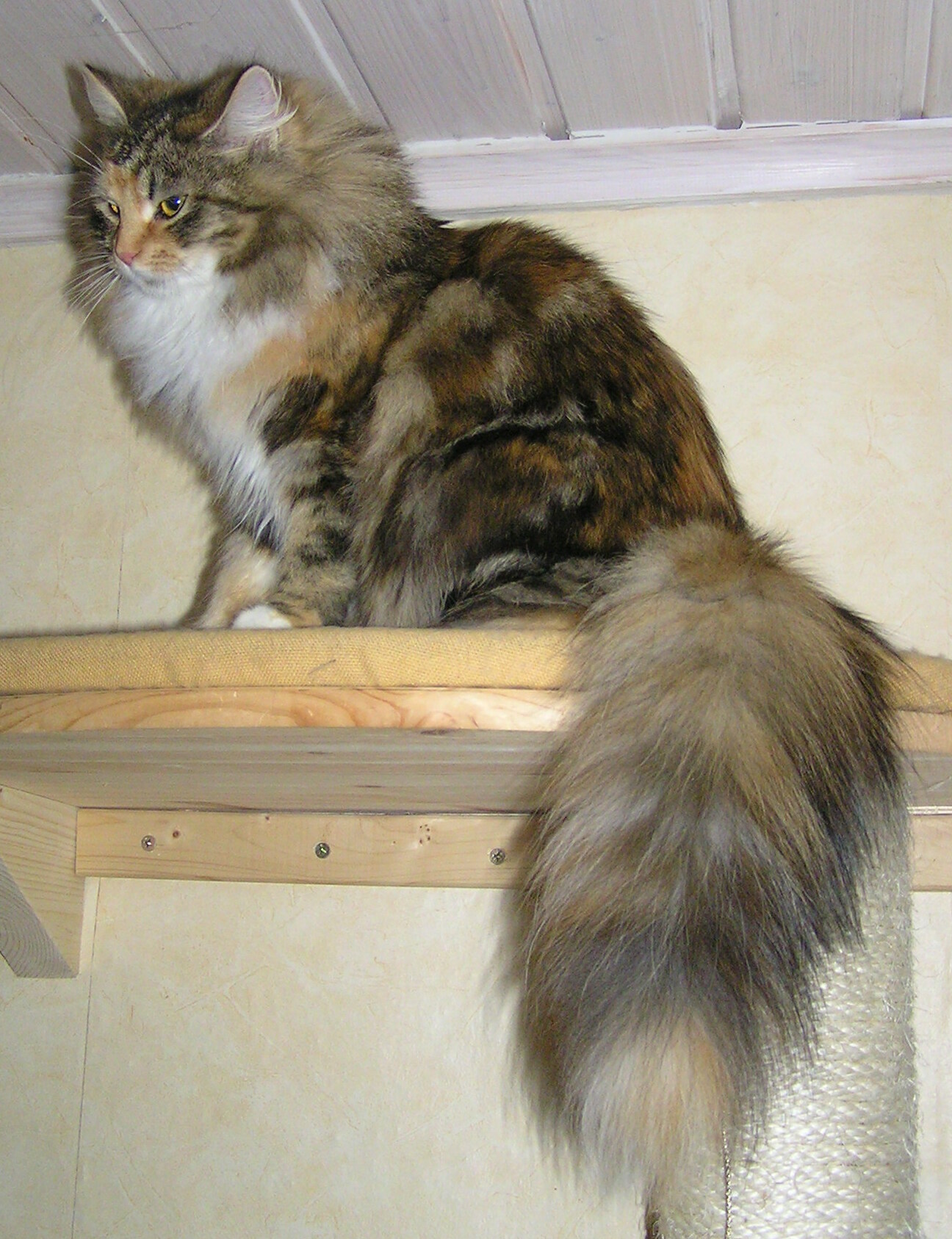
One-year-old black tortoiseshell tabby and white cat

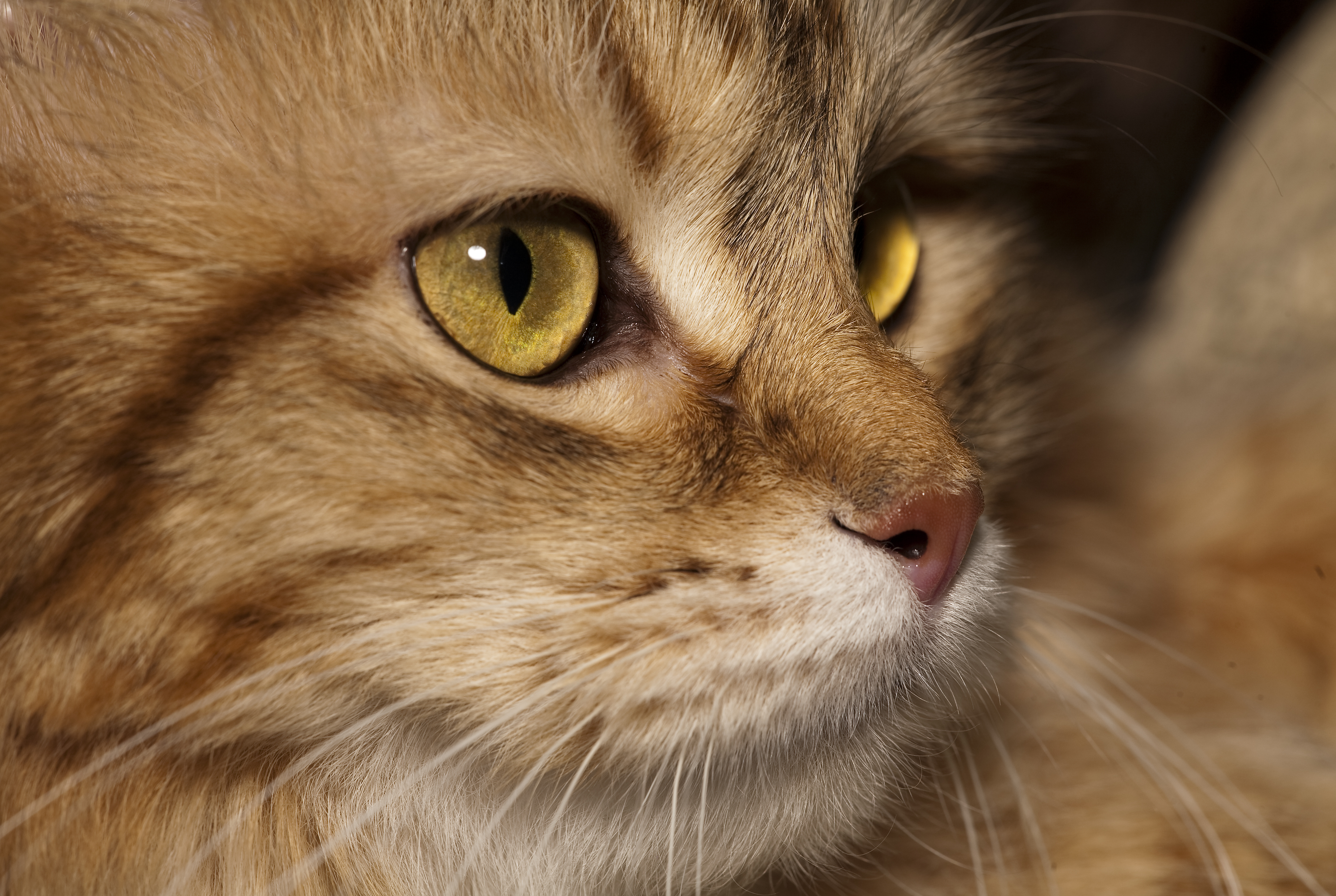
Face profile of a black sunshine tabby adult

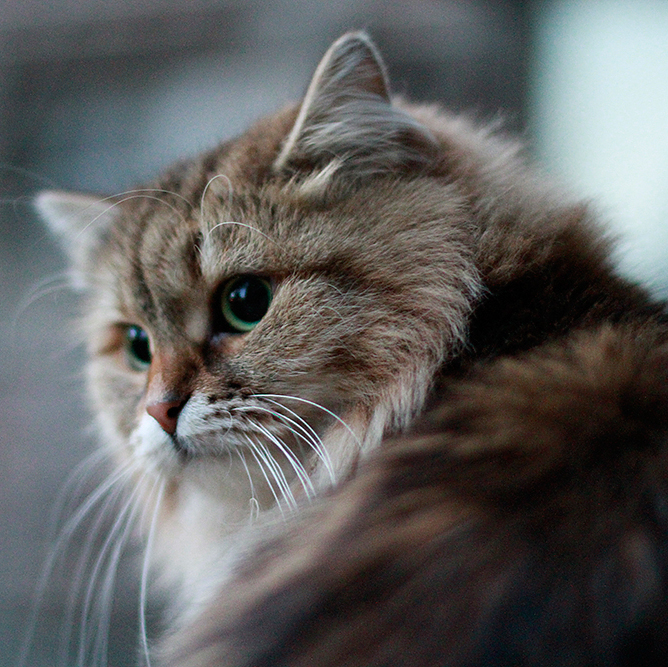
Typical facial features of a black sunshine tabby adult

=== Appearance ===
==== Body ====
Known to be an exceptionally agile jumper, the Siberian is a strong and powerfully-built cat, with strong hindquarters and large, well-rounded paws. Although heavy boned, the legs are relatively short. Their bushy tail is medium in length and slightly shorter than the torso length. Their body lengths varies in size from medium to large. Siberians have firm, barrel-shaped torsos, and stockier builds than other cats. The general impression of the body is one of circles and roundness. The posture can be compared with the characteristic wide and sturdy stance of a bulldog.

Siberians have a slight arch to their back, because their hind legs are slightly longer than the front legs. This shape and the power in their hind legs contribute to their incredible agility and enable them to jump exceptionally high.

Siberians develop rather slowly, reaching their fully matured body at about five years of age. Female Siberians are considerably smaller than males. Full-grown adults weigh on average between 4,5–9kg.

==== Face ====
The characteristic round shapes are also clearly visible in the facial features of the Siberian. Their round face consists of a broad forehead at the top of their skull and narrows slightly to a full-rounded, short muzzle. The eyes are large and round, and give an overall sweet expression to their face. The outer corners are slightly angled towards the base of their ears. Their medium-sized ears are broad at the base and rounded at the tip. They are slightly tilted forwards and should be set as much on the sides of the head as on top, preferably one to one and one half ear width apart. Lynx ear tipping is allowed.

==== Coat ====
Siberians express the three natural types of feline fur: guard hair, awn hair, and down hair. These three layers form a semi-long to long, well-developed, very dense triple-coat, of which the guard hairs are water-repellent. This unique dense triple-coat protects the cat from the Russian weather extremes. The thick fur is textured but glossy, and needs frequent grooming to prevent matting. The summer coat is distinctly shorter than the winter coat. Because the Siberians are a slow-maturing breed, it can take several years for the coat of young Siberians to fully develop.

Siberian cats moult twice a year. They will shed their heavy winter coat during spring. This winter moult is instigated not by a change in temperature but by a change in day length. Many Siberians will experience a less intense "mini-moult" at the end of the summer season to prepare for their thick winter coat, unlike other cats, which will experience a "heavy moult" more than twice a year. However, they will still lose fur year-round and require grooming multiple times a week in order to prevent their dense triple-coat from matting.

Two adult cats showing the difference in coat length and density during the year

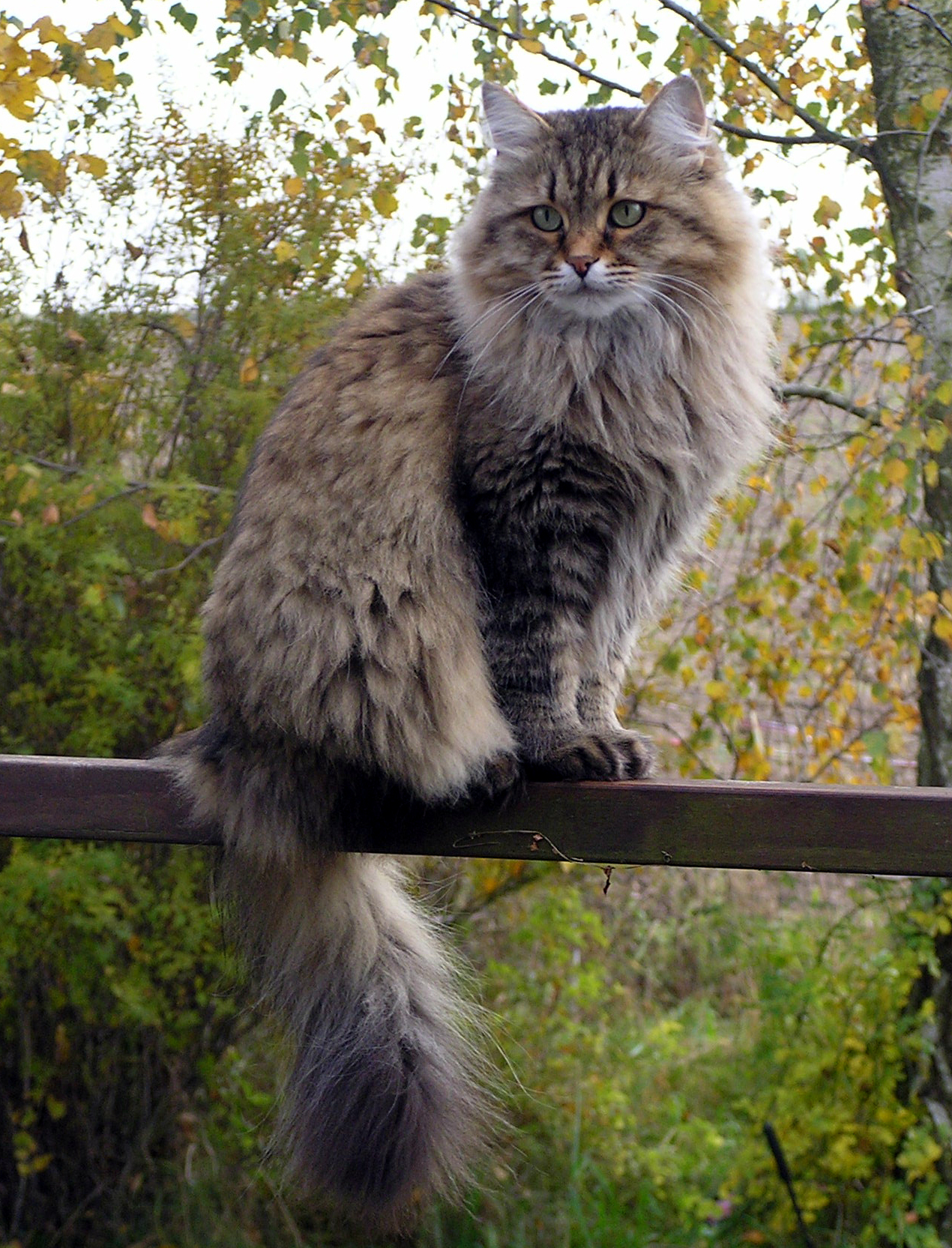
Summer coat

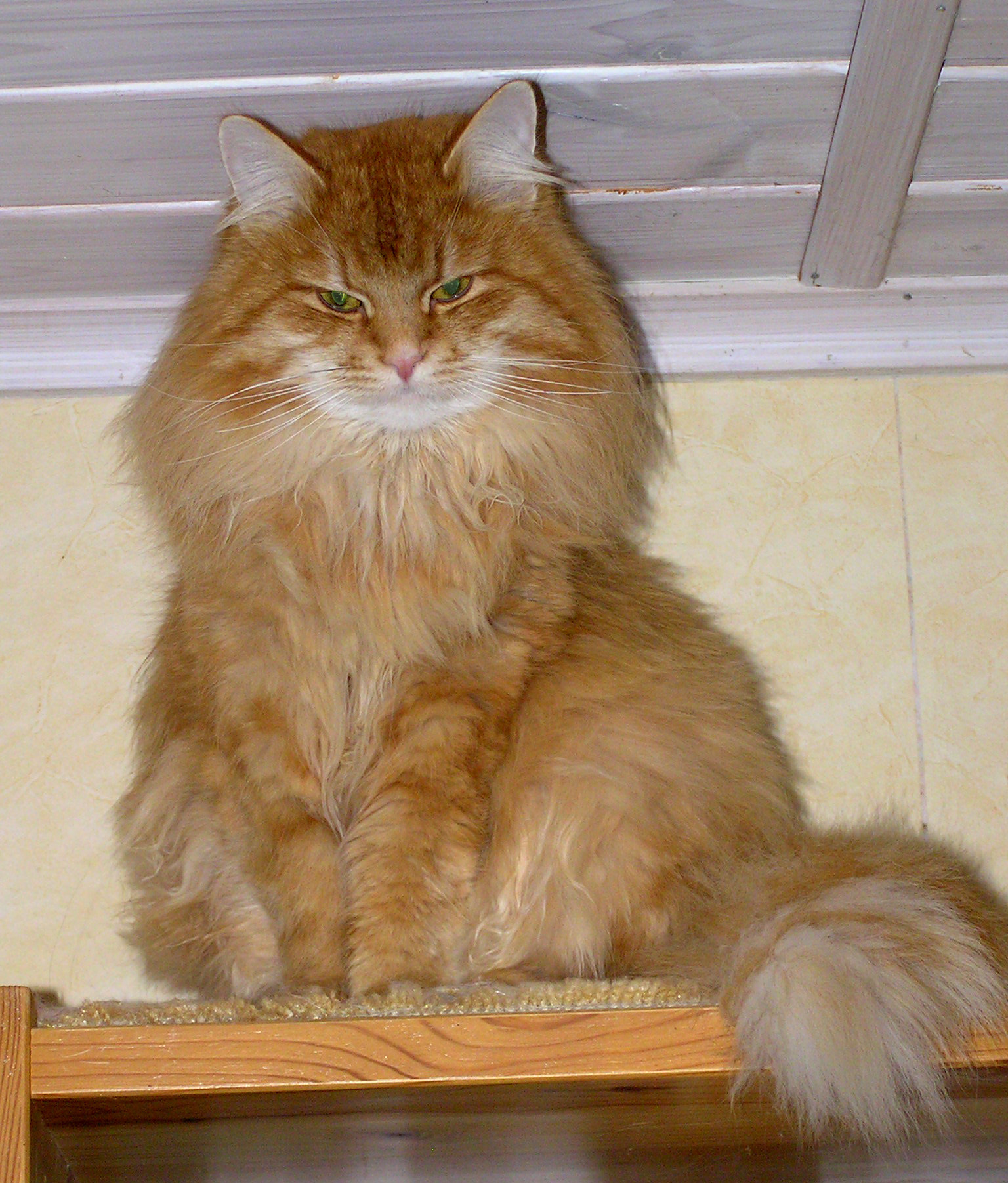
Winter coat

===== Colouration =====
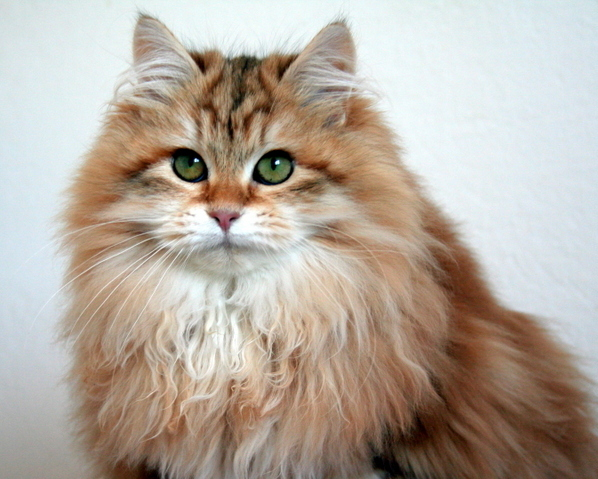
Black sunshine tabby adult

All Western coat colours and patterns are genetically possible in the breed, such as tabby, solid, tortoiseshell, and bicolour. However, the most common colour in the Siberian cat breed is black (brown) mackerel tabby. The Western coat colours are white, black, blue, red, and cream. All major registries do not permit the Eastern colour varieties of chocolate, lilac, cinnamon, and fawn in the Siberian breed. The allowance for the dilution modified caramel and apricot depends on the registry.

All colourations are allowed with any amount of white spotting. Furthermore, all colourations can be combined with the golden and silver (incl. smoke) factors, which are allowed in 'tabby', 'tipped,' and 'shaded' banding. In Siberians the golden colouration is caused by the CORIN-gene. This golden colour is called 'sunshine', and the silver-golden variety is called 'bimetallic' or 'silver sunshine'. The gene is located on the wide band locus, and the responsible allele is only found in the Siberian breed. The two other identified alleles on this wide band locus are responsible for the golden coats in golden tigers and British Shorthairs.

The Eastern colourpoint pattern is found in the Neva Masquerade, and is non-permitted in registries where the breed is separately registered. In the combined registries, the Neva Masquerade cats are judged separately in the colourpoint-category.

====== Solid-white ======
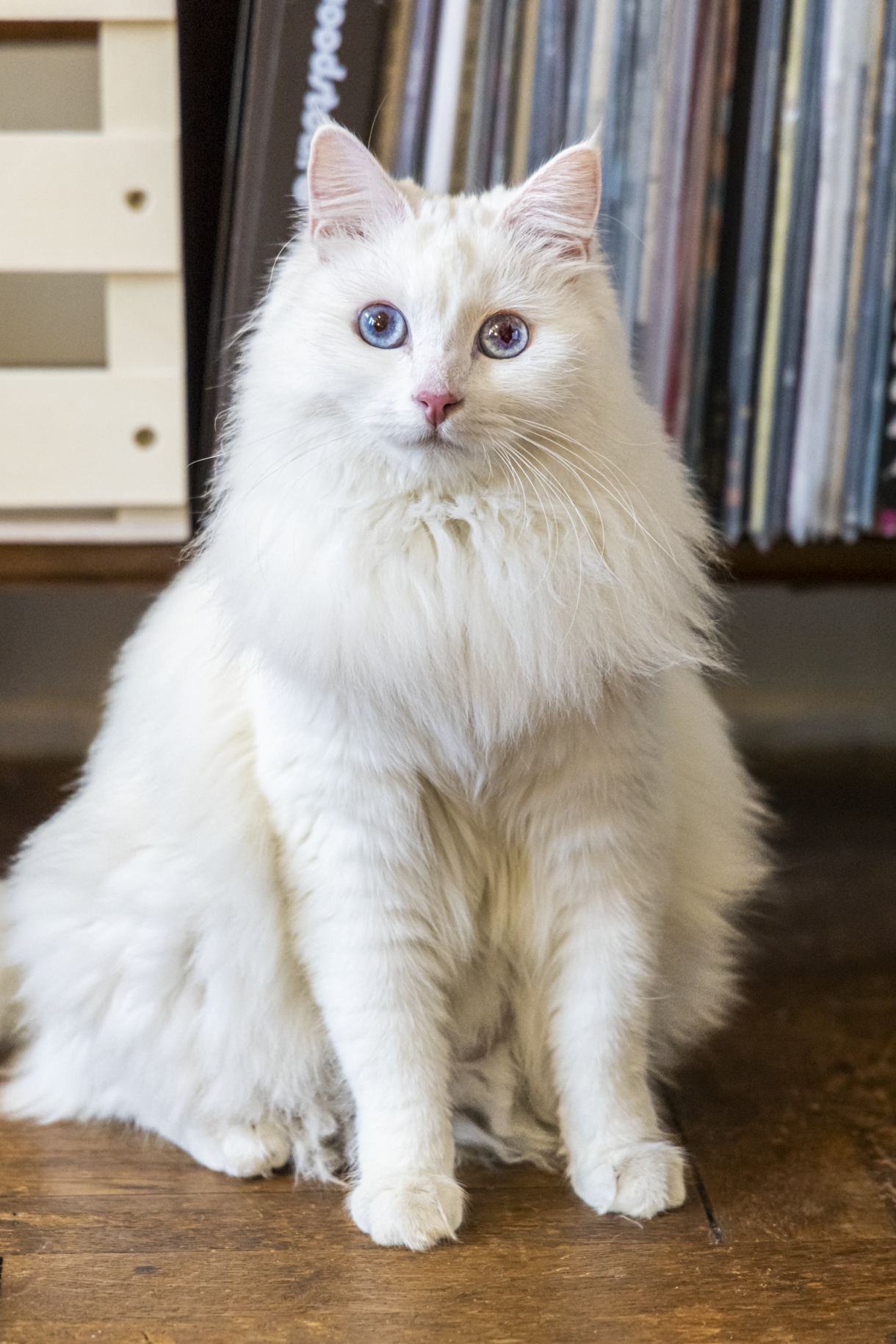
Solid-white blue-eyed female kitten

Completely white (solid-white) Siberian cats are not considered Neva Masquerades, as they do not necessarily possess the colourpoint gene covered under the white spotting mutation. The solid-white colouring is considered Western, and is one of the many colours of traditional Siberian cats. Solid-white traditional Siberian cats can also have blue eyes, however, this is due to a lack of melanin pigment and not a result of the colourpoint gene as is the case with the Neva Masquerade. Solid-white blue-eyed cats have a higher prevalence of genetic deafness. It is advisable and in most cat registries (and certain countries) mandatory to test (BEAR- or OAE-testing) white cats for this trait before breeding with them.

==== Eye colour ====
Siberians come in all eye colours, but clear colours are desirable. However, several registries only allow blue and odd eyes in the solid-white and bicolour varieties, leaving only colours in the golden-copper to green spectrum for the other coats. The solid-white Siberian has four permitted eye colours; blue, green, golden-copper, and odd-eyed.

Blue or odd-coloured eyes in cats are usually linked to extensive white spotting or colourpoint patterns. However, recent molecular studies show that blue eyes can also occur without these traits. This phenotype, known as dominant blue eyes (DBE), involves one or two blue eyes or sectorial heterochromia, often with minimal white spotting. Several DBE family lines are present in the breed, although not recognised by all cat registries.

=== Behaviour ===
Siberians are known for their playful and adventurous personality, while at the same time being very friendly and easy-going. The breed is known for its dog-like behaviour, due to its affectionate and highly loyal personality. This intelligent breed learns easily and is even known for its ability to learn the "dog game" fetch. They are very social and prefer to be involved in all activities of a household. Siberians are often fascinated by water, and do not mind getting a little wet, as their guard hairs are water-repellent.

The Siberian is a vocal cat, although not in loudness but in frequency. It is known to produce a wide range of different sounds including its melodious chirping voice and a deep, resonant purr.

== Neva Masquerade ==
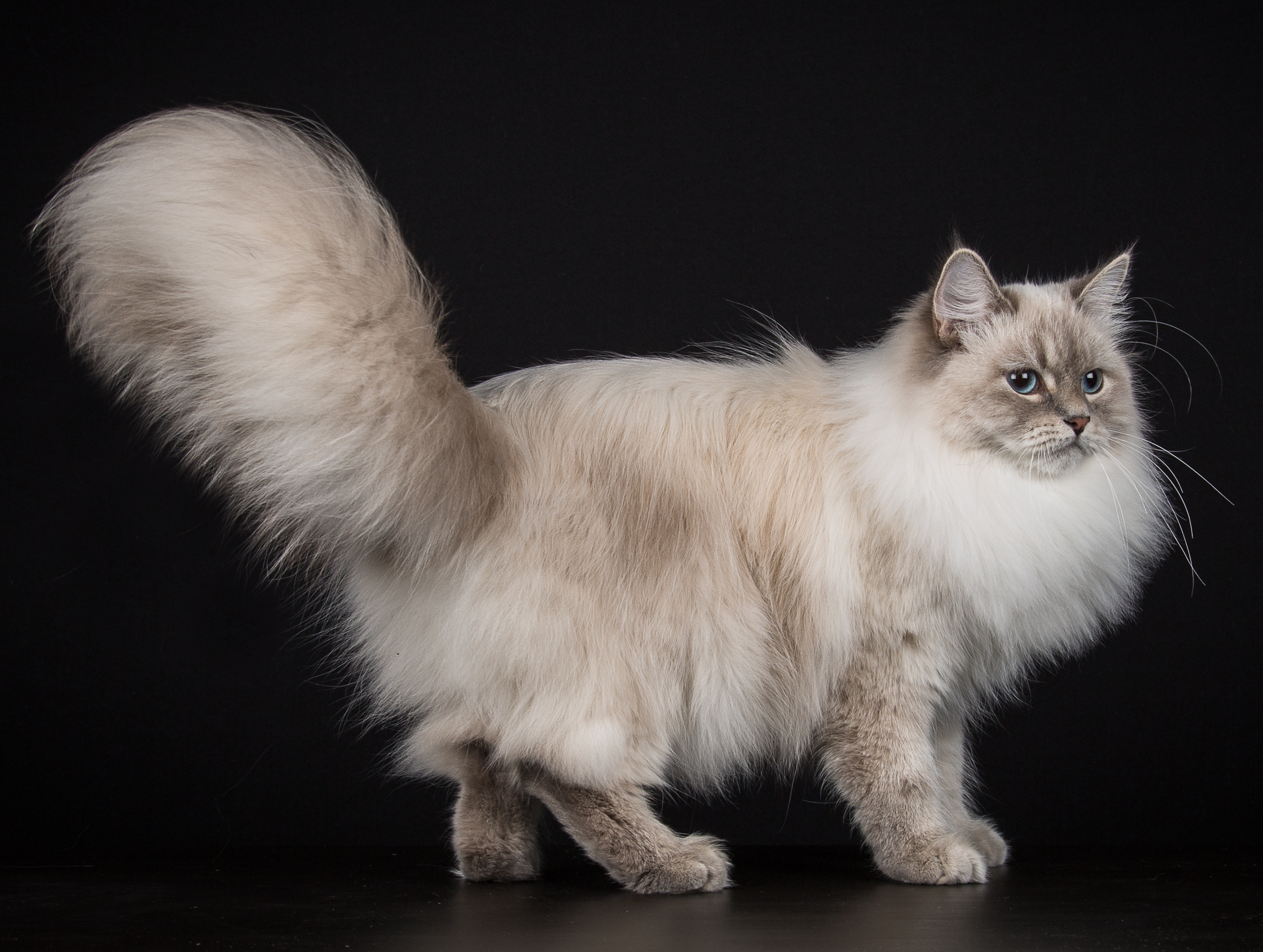
Colourpoint Neva Masquerade

The Neva Masquerade is the sister breed or colourpoint variety of the Siberian cat. It bears the Siamese/Himalayan-type colourpoint gene (c^{s}c^{s}), which results in darker markings on the extremities of their body and bright blue eyes. The gene pool of the Siberian and the Neva Masquerade share a big overlap, as the two have been crossbred for many years. Nowadays, there exists a test for point mutations, which allows breeders to specifically target carriers of the popular point gene.

The Siberian breed was generally recognised in the late-1990s and 2000s by the cat fancy, however, some registries chose to not accept colourpoint varieties in the Siberian breed and register these colourpoint cats under the Neva Masquerade breed.

=== Recent studies ===
Although the Neva Masquerade shares many characteristics with the Siberian in terms of character and appearance, recent studies have shown distinctions between the two in terms of body language, vocalisations, and feline hereditary diseases, such as polycystic kidney disease (PKD). The prevalence of PKD in the Neva Masquerade gene pool is of concern as crossbreeding the two sister breeds could potentially spread PKD into the Siberian breed.

== Health ==
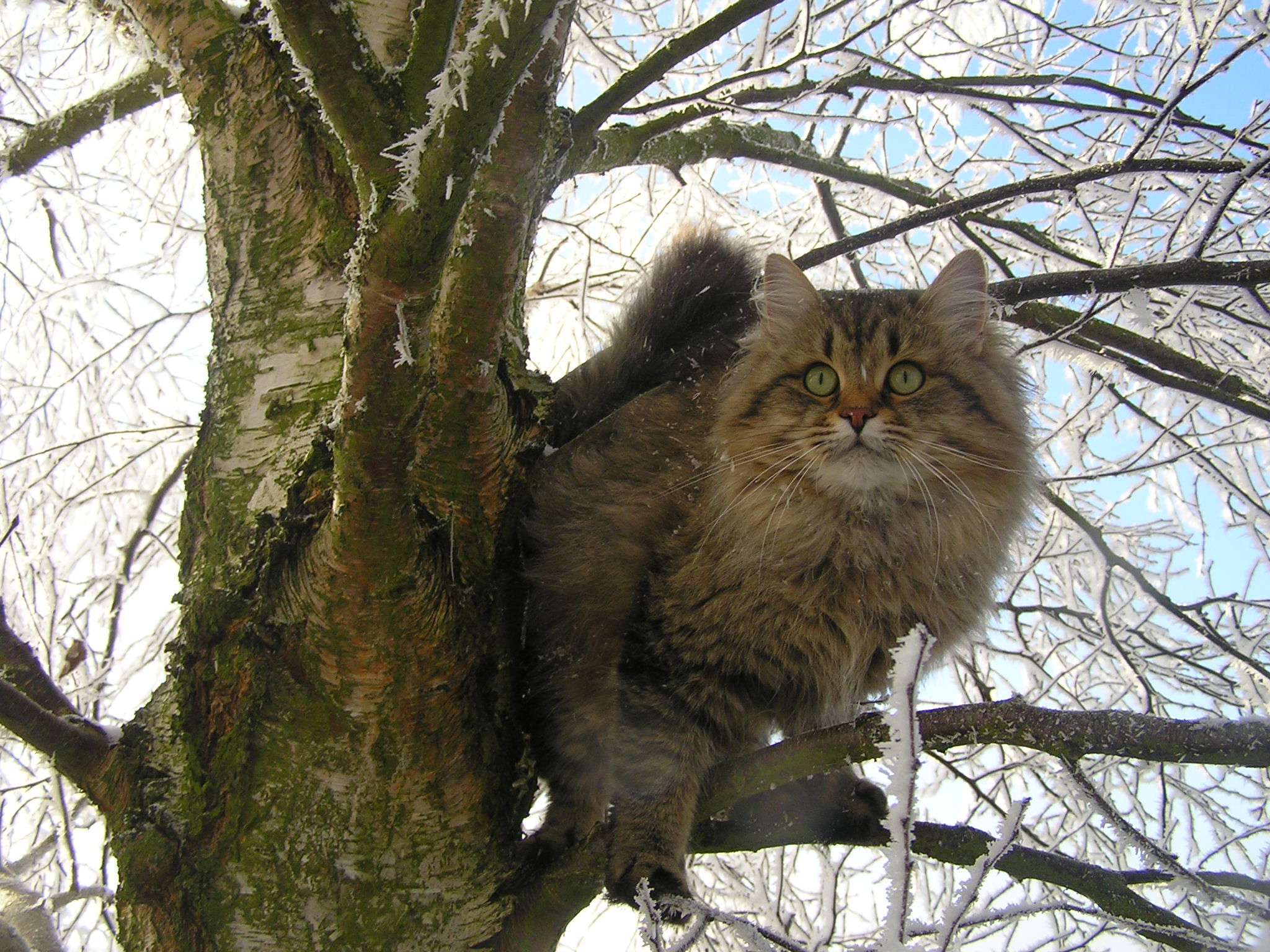
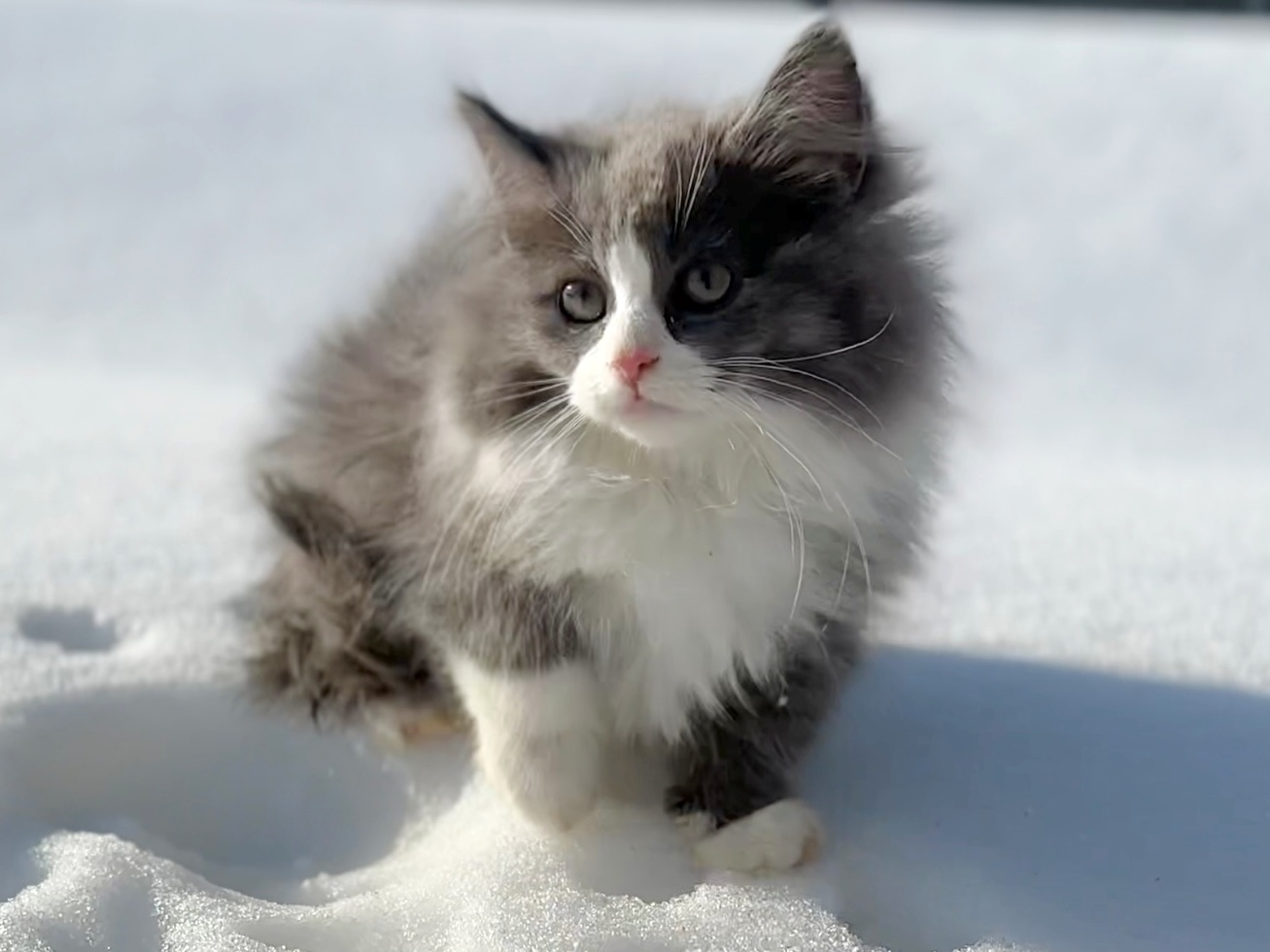
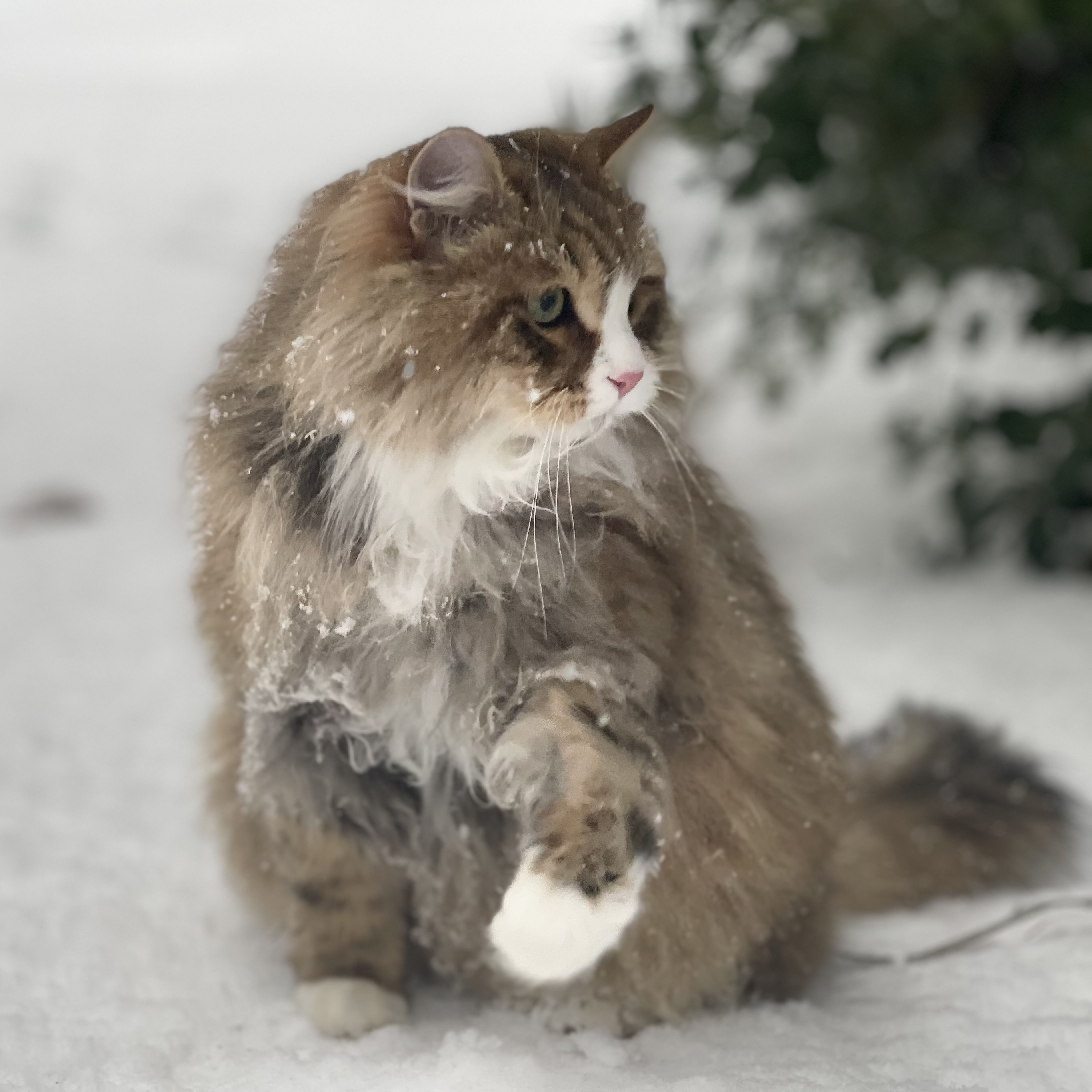
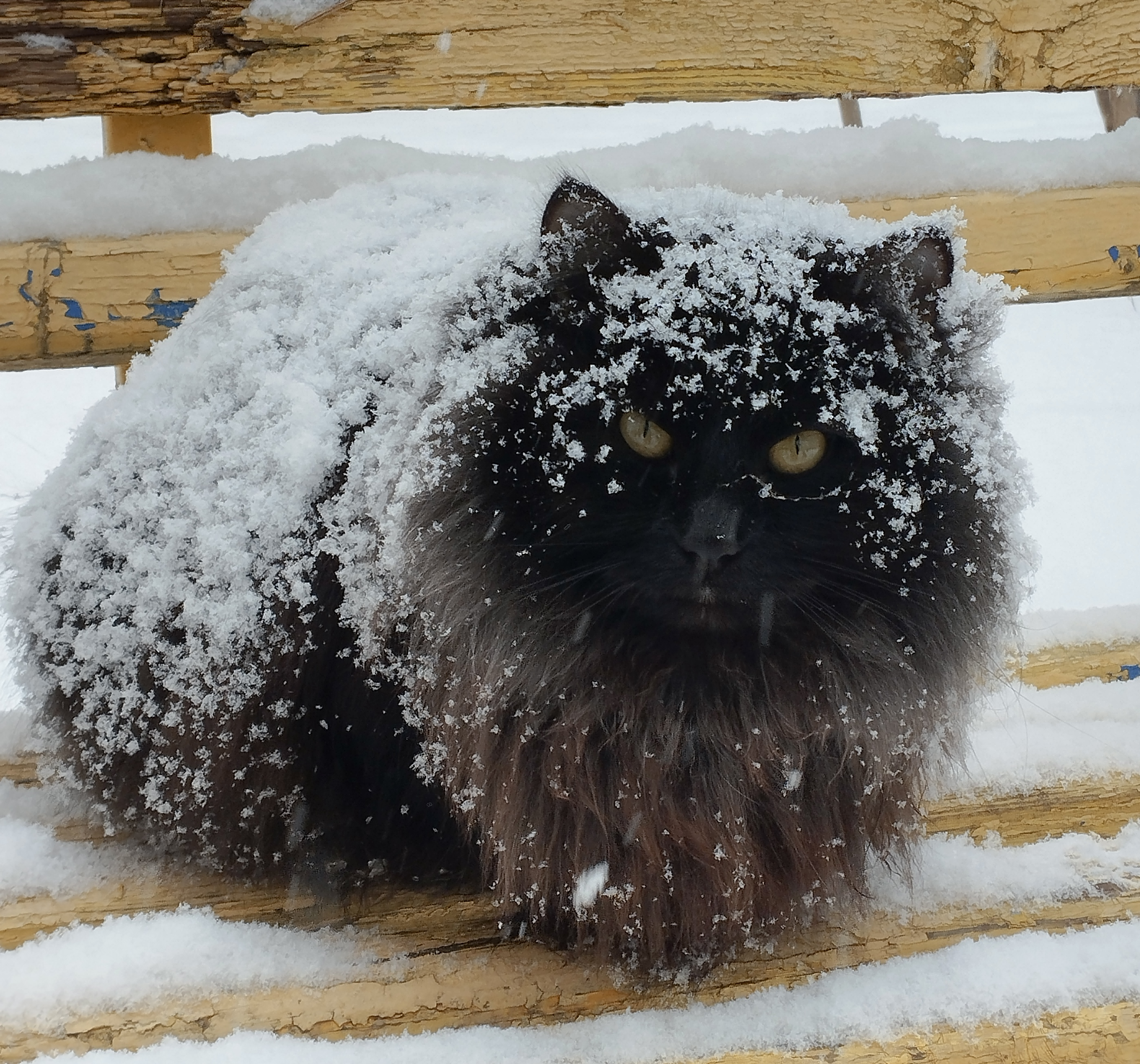
The dense triple-coat allows this athletic and adventurous breed to survive in harsh climates

The Siberian is developed from an ancient natural landrace, which makes it a relatively healthy cat breed. In fact, the Siberian breed has the highest heterozygosity degree (genetic variation) among all cat breeds, comparable to random-bred cats.

In a study with almost 550,000 cats of 18 breeds, the disease risks of the different cat breeds were evaluated based on 24 diagnostic categories. Due to the athleticism and energy of the breed, injury is the most common cause of morbidity. The Siberian has the highest score in injury risk of all purebreds, whilst it scores lowest, together with the Ragdoll, in the overall morbidity risk. Siberians had a significantly lower risk in 11 of the 24 diagnostic categories compared to other breeds, including endocrine, ear, neurological and neoplasia. Apart from injury, the Siberian had a higher incidence rate of locomotor and female reproduction-related conditions compared to other cat breeds.

== Fur allergen levels ==
While there is no allergen-free cat or dog breed, the hypoallergenic dander qualities of the Siberian coat have been noted and commented on for almost ten years. While there is no scientific evidence, breeders and pet owners claim that Siberians can be safe for many allergy sufferers. Since females of all feline breeds produce lower levels of Fel d 1, breeders often suggest that allergic families adopt female cats. Allergy sufferers are advised to check their reactivity directly with the parent cats from whom they plan to adopt a kitten. Many people believe that the breed produces less Fel d 1, the primary allergen present in cats.

In 1999, Indoor Biotechnologies tested the fur of four cats for Fel d 1; a mixed breed, two Siberians, and an Abyssinian. The results showed the Siberian and Abyssinian cat fur as having lower Fel d 1 levels than the mixed breed cat. Indoor Biotechnologies cautions that the Siberian levels were still high, and that the mixed breed sample was "exceptionally high". Indoor Biotechnologies warns against using these results to make decisions about pet ownership.

This test of fur allergen levels is cited by many Siberian breeder websites as evidence the breed is hypoallergenic. Critiques include that the sample size (only 4 cats) is below statistical significance, was submitted by a Siberian breeder, and as mentioned, one cat was found to have Fel d1 allergen levels of 62.813 μg (roughly 60× higher than any published professional study).

A not-for-profit association of breeders (Siberian Research Inc) was founded in 2005 to study allergen levels and genetic diseases in the Siberian breed. As of March 2010, fur and saliva samples from over 300 Siberians have been submitted for analysis, many directly from a veterinarian. Salivary Fel d 1 allergen levels in Siberians ranged from 0,08 to 27 μg/mL of saliva, while fur levels ranged from 5 to 1300 μg. The high end of these ranges is consistent with results from prior studies, though the low end is below expected results.

All Siberians tested were found to produce some Fel d 1. About half of Siberians were found to have Fel d 1 levels lower than other breeds, while under twenty percent would be considered very low. Within the low group, males and females had comparable allergen levels.
