= Acromelanism =

Colouration of animal coat/fur

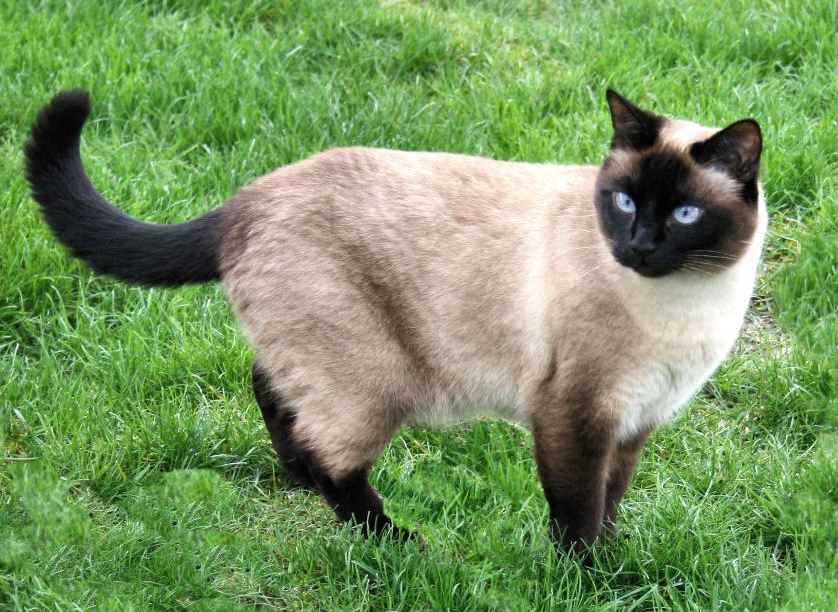
A domestic shorthair cat with seal (black) point colouration.

Acromelanism is a genetic condition that results in pigmentation being affected by temperature. Generally it creates a colourpoint pattern where the main body is light while the colder parts such as legs and ears are dark. It is commonly known for the colouration of Siamese, and other colourpoint cats, but can be found in many other species including dogs, rabbits, rats, mice, guinea pigs, minks, and gerbils. It is a specific type of point colouration, as the extremities of an animal are a different colour to the rest of the body.

== Description ==
Colourpoint patterns are where the extremities (paws, face, ears and tail) of the animal are coloured differently compared to the rest of the body. The areas with different colour may be referred as 'points' or being 'pointed'. Colour can spread to the rest of the body, but is concentrated on the extremities.

Colourpoint patterns occur due to acromelanism, which is a type of partial albinism where pigmentation is affected by temperature. Cold temperatures trigger pigment development while warm temperatures decrease pigment development. The extremities are colder than the rest of the body which is why they darken.

== C locus in mammals ==
The C locus in mammals is most often associated with the TYR gene, which controls the production of the tyrosinase enzyme that produces melanin.

The colour point allele is at the C locus, where some forms of typical albinism are also located. Point is recessive for all animals. In cats, two copies of c^{s}, one from each parent, are needed for points to be expressed.

== In cats ==
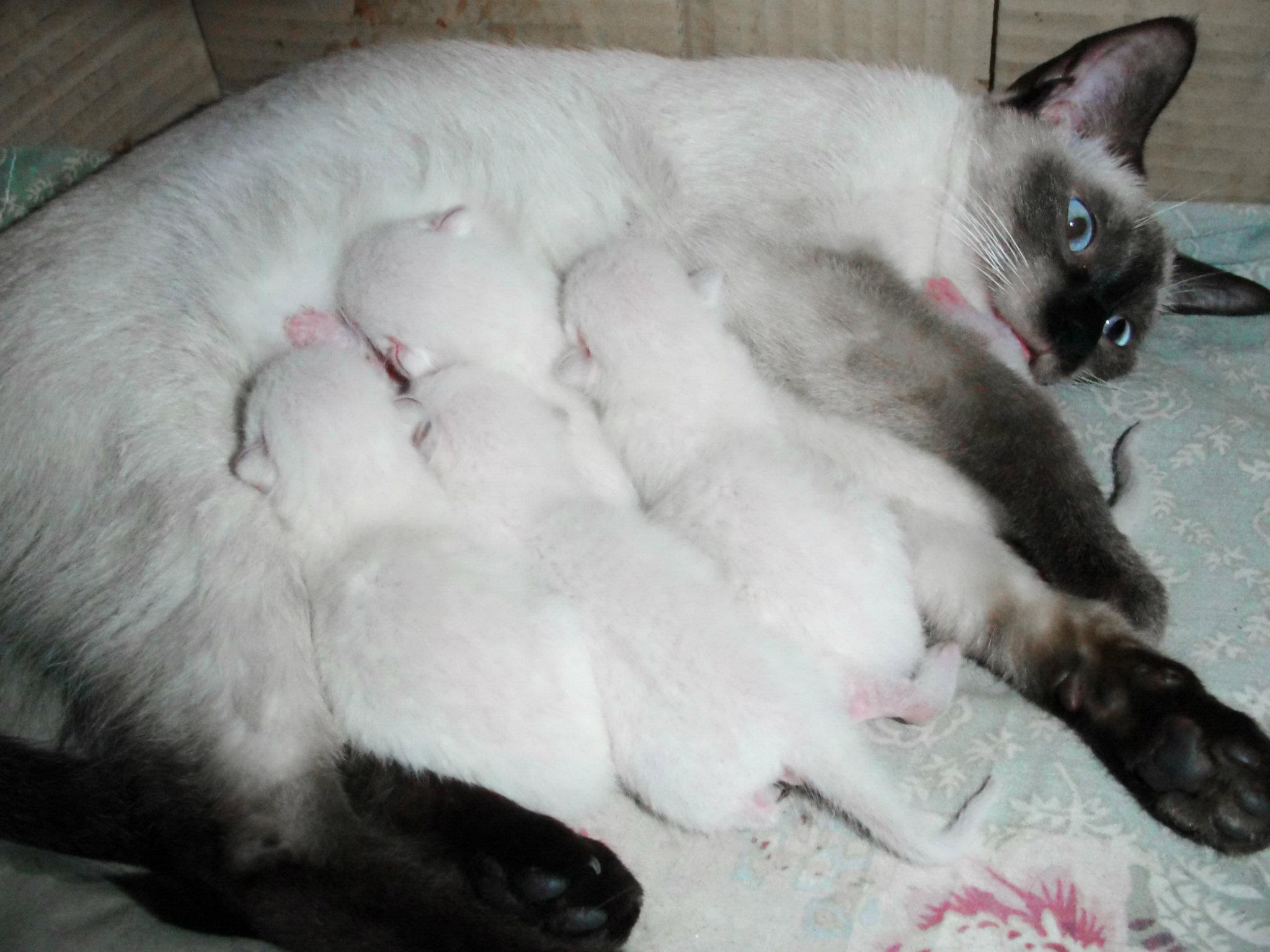
Newborn kittens suckling milk from their seal point mother cat. Colourpoint kittens are born solid-white.

Point colouration in domestic cats originated in random-bred populations in Southeast Asia. Although the pattern is most commonly associated with the Siamese breed, the vast majority of colourpoint cats worldwide are not descended from these modern pedigree Siamese (or Thai) cats and are domestic shorthairs or longhairs without any Siamese ancestry. The pattern predates the development of formal cat breeds, which only started around 1875, and was dispersed globally centuries before through ship cats during the era of maritime exploration. Coat colour alone does not reliably indicate recent descent from either Southeast Asia or any specific breed, as the recessive colourpoint allele can appear in otherwise fully pigmented litters. It only indicates that both parent cats carry a colourpoint gene.

Colourpoint is a form of partial albinism resulting from a mutation of tyrosinase (TYR), an enzyme involved with melanin production. There exist multiple allele variants of the colourpoint; as of 2026, the known variants are c^{s} (point), c^{b} (sepia), c^{m} (mocha), and the combination of c^{s}c^{b} (mink) is also found.

The mutated enzyme is thermolabile (temperature-dependent); it fails to work at normal body temperatures, but becomes active in cooler areas of the skin. As a result, dark pigment is limited to the coldest areas of the body, that is, the extremities; the nose, ears, feet, and tail. Pointed c^{s}c^{s} kittens are born solid-white, due to the warmth of uterus. As the kitten ages, the cooler areas darken while warmer areas remain cream to white in colour. Colourpoints can usually be observed at four weeks.

As the expression of the gene responsible for the pointed pattern is regulated by temperature, pointed cats who live in cooler environments often show increased darkening of their fur relative to cats who live in warmer climates; in some extreme cases the entire coat will darken. Shaving a cat can also change the colour of the coat. Conditions that affect the temperature of the animal can change the colour too, e.g. pyrexia can inactivate tyrosinase and result in new growth being uncoloured and obesity may result in the whole body turning dark due to the decreased skin temperature.

Because of the pigment restriction caused by the temperature-sensitive tyrosinase, pointed cats' eyes are always shades of blue because the blue layer in the eye common to all cats is not covered by another colour. The back of the eye also lacks pigment, giving colourpoint cats' pupils a red and silver reflection in the dark, unlike a normally pigmented cat's shining silver-green or -blue.

Strabismus is genetically linked to the colourpoint allele and is generally harmless.

Overview colour restriction produced by TYR
Name	Allele variant	Type	Description
full colour	C		wildtype allele resulting in full pigmentation and is completely dominant to all other known alleles at the locus
albinism	c, c^{2}		c (complete albinism, red-eyed albino) and c^{2} (albinism, blue-eyed albino) are two synonymous alleles recessive to all other alleles at the locus that cause albinism. Note that this is not the same as a solid white cat due to the dominant white (W) gene.
point	c^{s}	Himalayan (or Siamese)	c^{s} is the point allele associated with the Siamese or Himalayan colourpoint pattern. The eye colour in homozygous c^{s}c^{s} is grey-blue to cobalt blue. It is a temperature-sensitive gradient of greatest pigmentation at the points and less on the torso.
mink	c^{s}c^{b}	Tonkinese	c^{s} and c^{b} are codominant, with heterozygous c^{b}/c^{s} cats having an intermediate phenotype termed mink, in which the pigment distribution is between sepia and point, and the eye colour is blue-green (aquamarine). Associated with the Tonkinese cat.
sepia	c^{b}	Burmese	c^{b} is an allele called sepia (or solid), and is most associated with Burmese cats. The homozygous c^{b}c^{b} produces a pattern similar to the Siamese/Himalayan colourpoint, but with a much lower contrast and amber-yellow to green eyes.
mocha	c^{m}		c^{m} is a novel mutation in Burmese cats that results in a colour pattern named mocha. Its interactions with other alleles have not yet been fully established.

Comparison of different black (seal, sable) cats

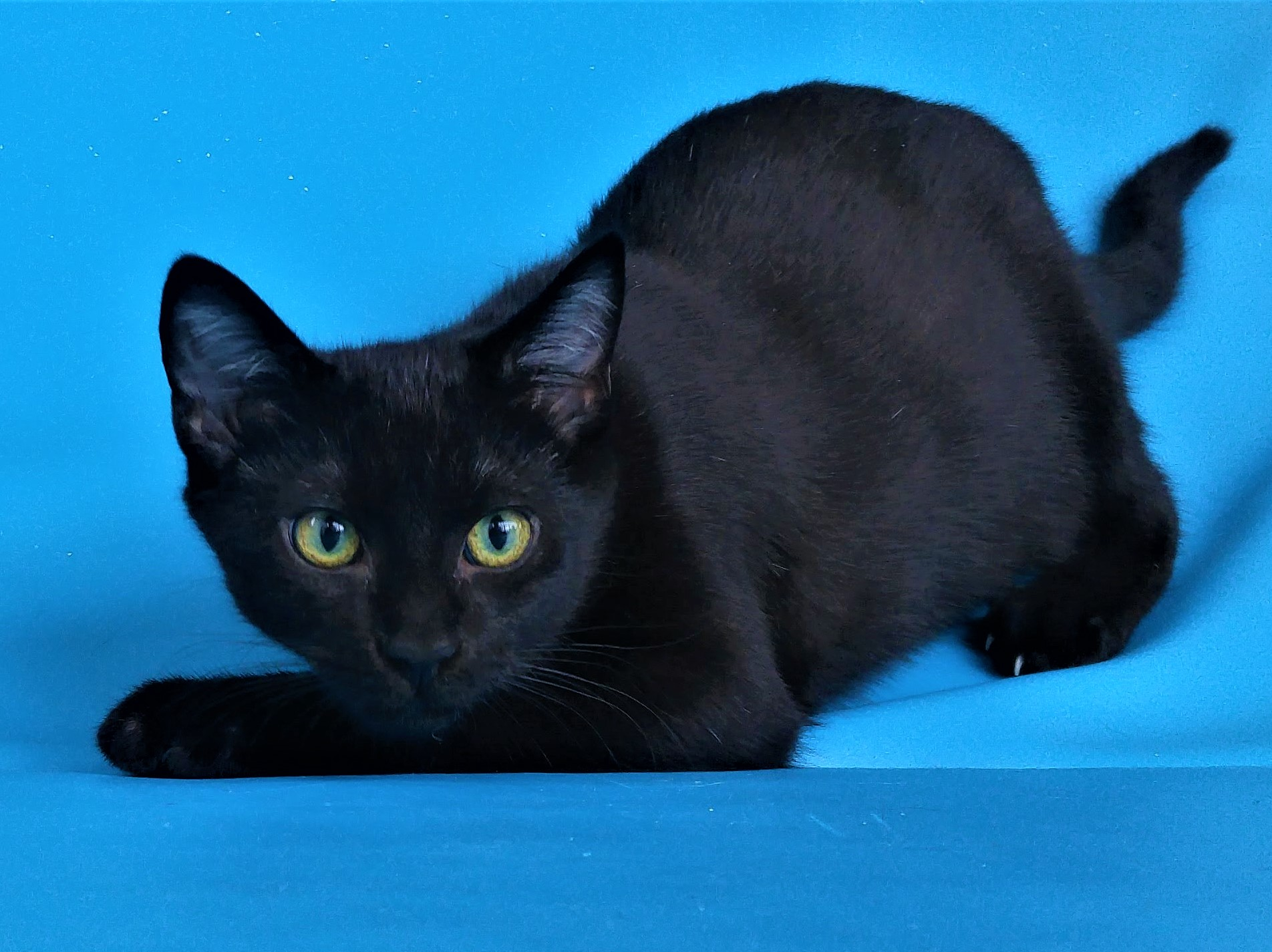
Black full colour

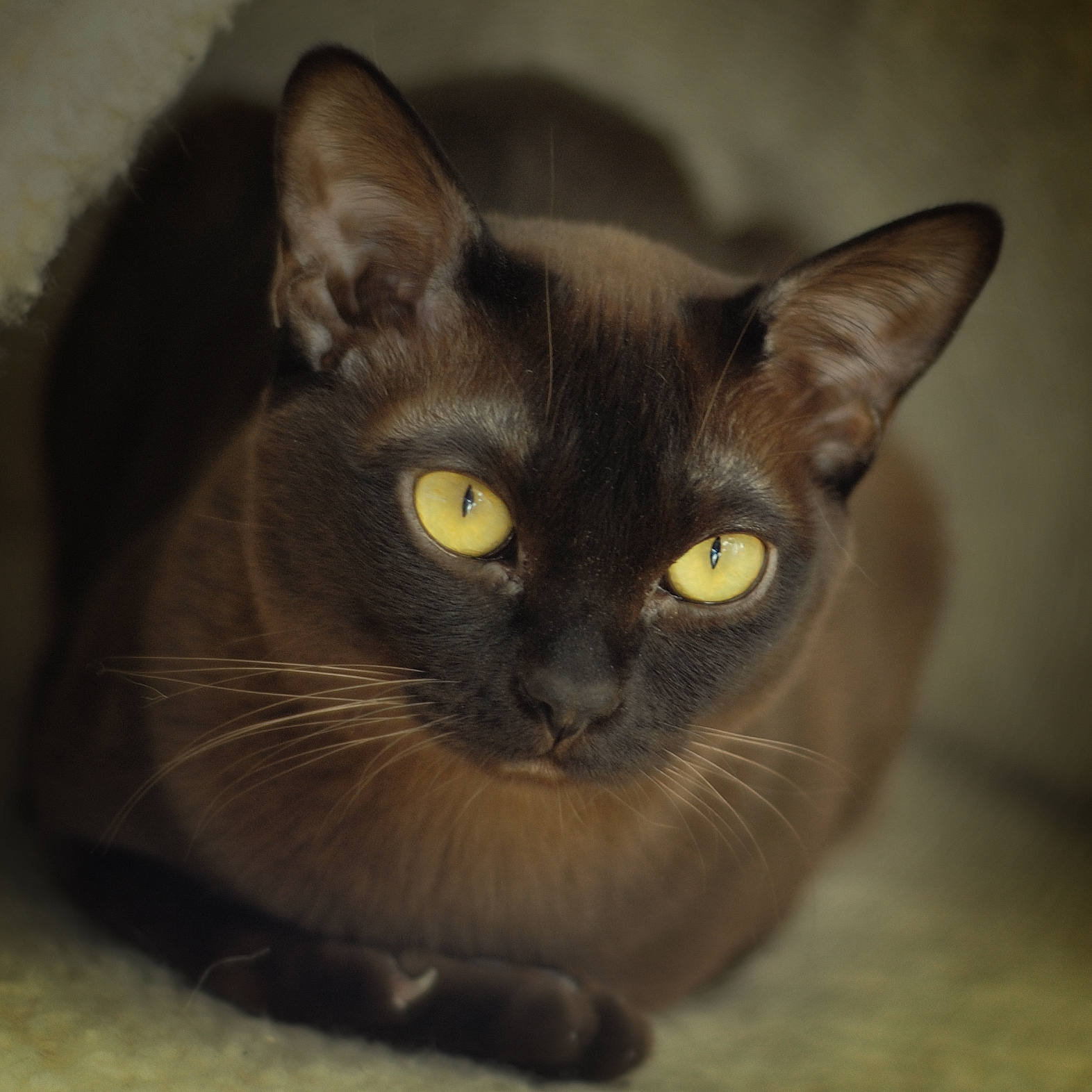
Black sepia Burmese

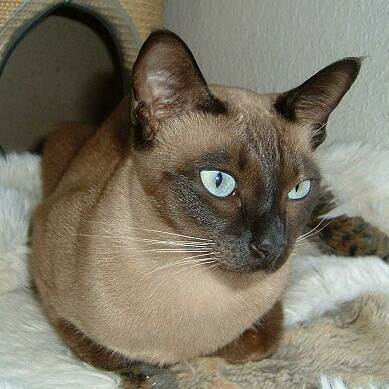
Black mink Tonkinese

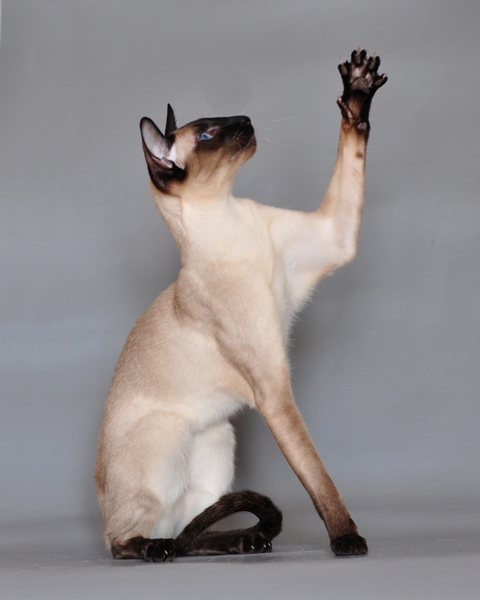
Black point Siamese

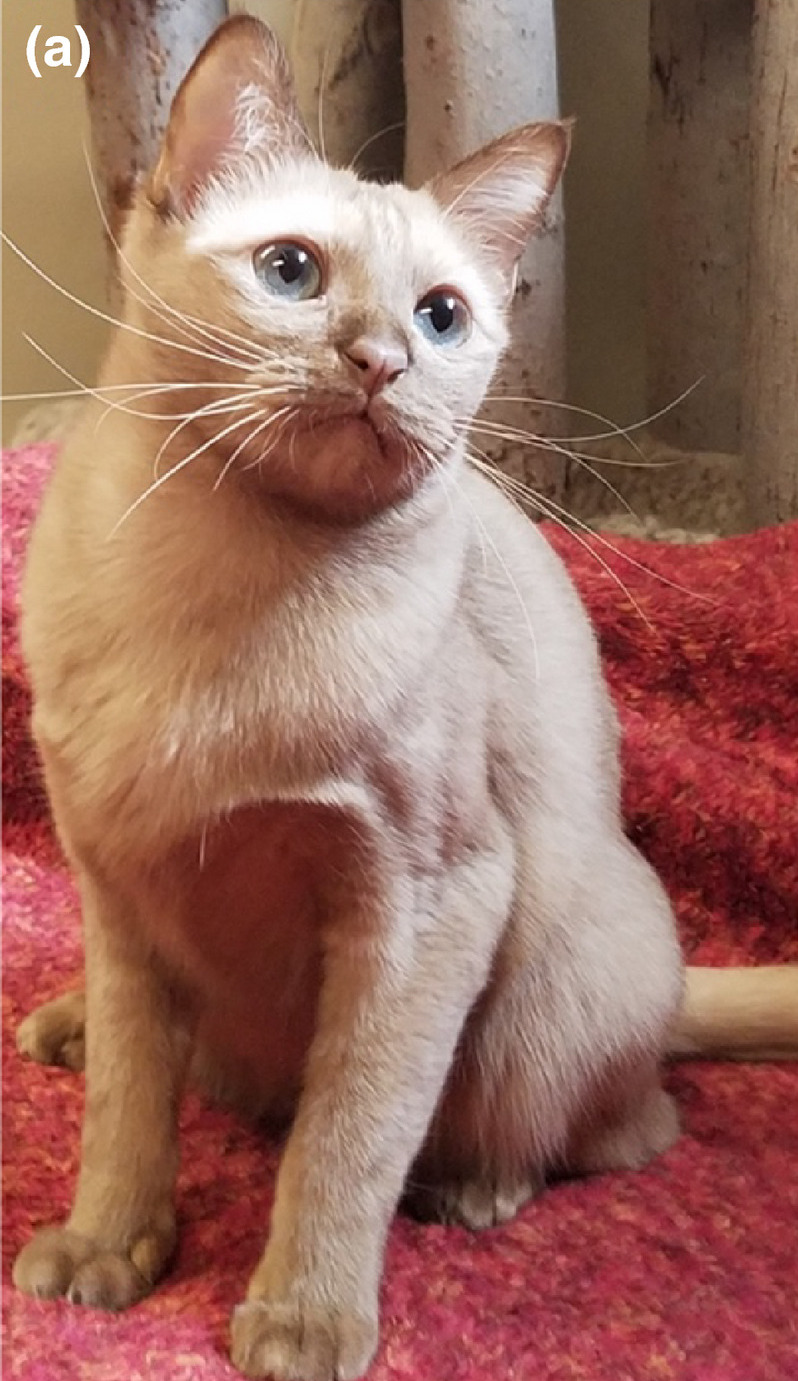
Black mocha

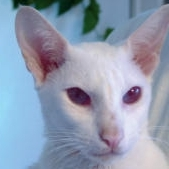
Black albino

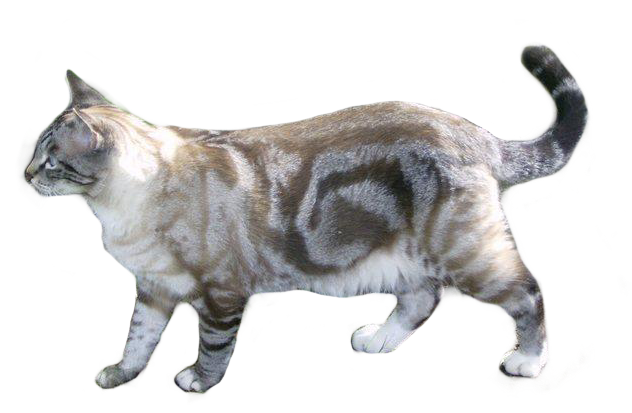
Black blotched tabby (US: lynx) point domestic shorthair

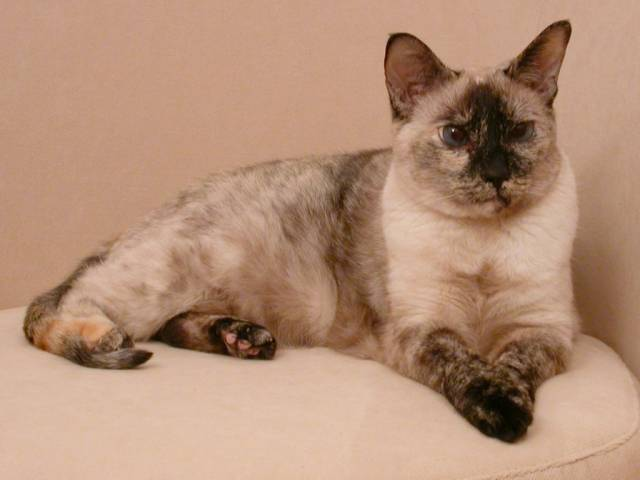
Black tortoiseshell point cat

Above an overview illustrating the effects of the C locus allelic series. The gradient in black pigment intensity represents the relative amount of pigmentation expressed, rather than the type or specific colour of pigment; all cats are black. The C locus influences the expression of both eumelanin and phaeomelanin. In colourpoint cats, the extremities (face, ears, paws and tail) may appear uniformly coloured or may exhibit additional patterning, such as tabby striping (US: “lynx point”) or tortoiseshell in individuals, depending on the genotype at other genetic loci.

A number of informal nicknames for point colourations in English-language usage differ from formal genetic terminology, which can vary by dialect, cat registry, and community. Black is also known as 'seal' (for point, and for sepia in New Zealand), 'sable' (for sepia and mink in the US) or 'brown' (for sepia in the UK and Australia), red as 'flame point', chocolate as 'champagne' (for sepia and mink in the US), and lilac as 'platinum' (for sepia and mink in the US) or 'frost'.

=== Tabby point ===
The tabby point (US: lynx point) pattern is formed by mating cats which both carry at least one recessive colourpoint gene and one of them bearing the dominant tabby (agouti) gene. It is characterised by a mixture of the darkening (reduced) of point colouration with distinct tabby striping on the head, tail, and legs, and an otherwise uniform and comparatively pale body. It is an accepted coat pattern for particular colourpoint breeds, however this differs with the breed standards for every cat registry.

Point colouration is inherent to the Siamese breed and some other closely related breeds. With most other breeds the colourpoints (including tabby point) were brought into the breed lines long after their establishment, but there are exceptions. For example, tabby point was a feature of some of the foundation stock of the Siberian, now called the Neva Masquerade.

== In dogs ==
Rarely, dogs (Canis familiaris) are documented with point colouration or acromelansim. Recent documented evidence about acromelanism in dogs has only existed since 2017, when the first colourpoint dachshund was reported in the Czech Republic. More dogs have appeared since then, with the majority from the Eastern Eurasian region and Canada. Genotyping the aforementioned dachshund revealed a mutation in the tyrosinase gene that results in a recessive colourpoint allele. A second tyrosinase variant is responsible for the colourpoint coat seen in a family of rescue dogs.

== In rabbits and rodents ==
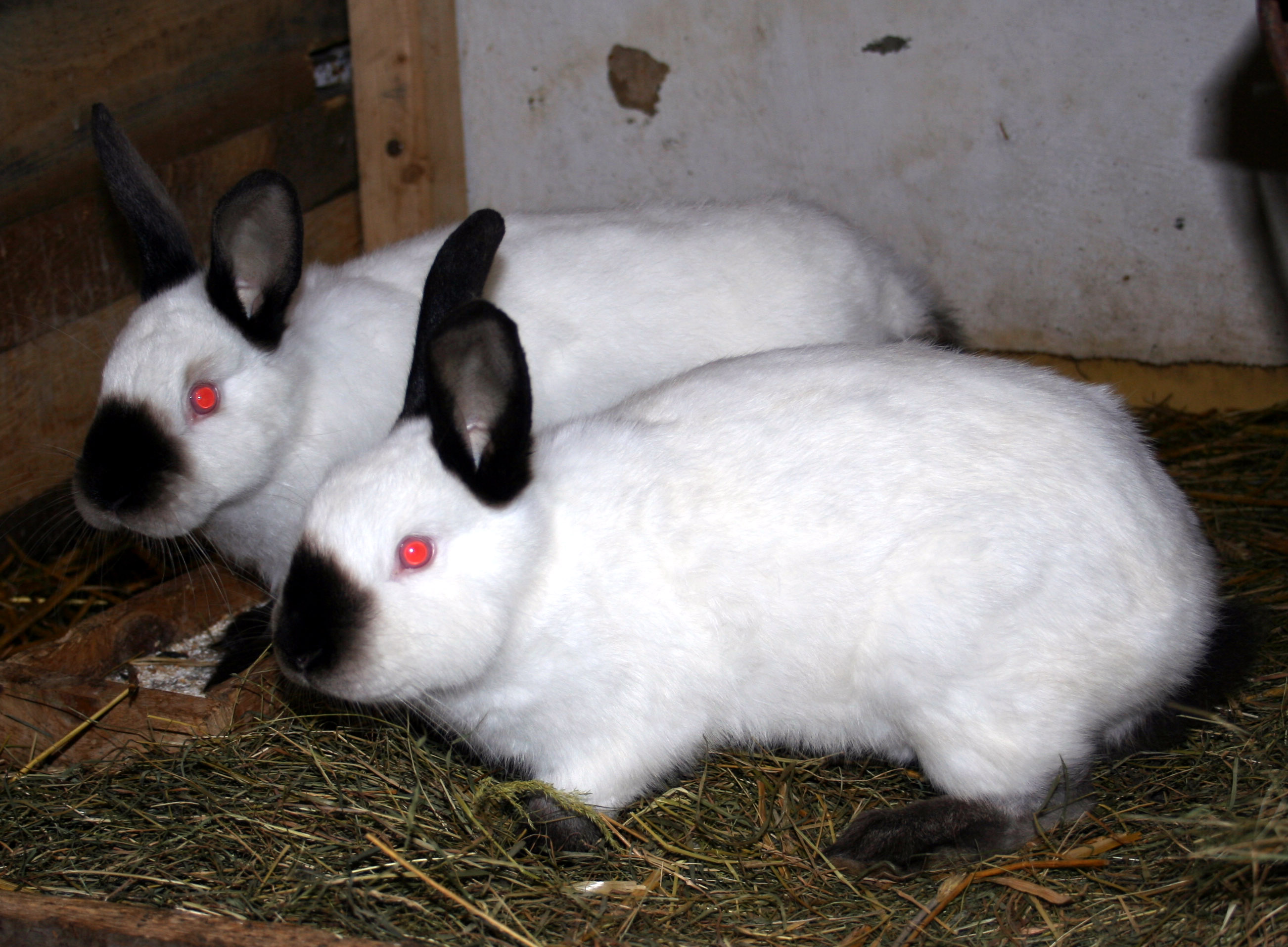
Californian rabbits with point colouration

=== Rabbit coat colours ===
Some rabbits that appear to be pointed white lack the red eyes, which indicates they are of different breeding. The following such coat colours are examples of those created, not with the ch gene, but with the cchl, cchd, or cchm gene in conjunction with the e gene:

- Blue point
- Chocolate point
- Lilac point
- Pearl
- Sable point
- Sallander
- Seal point
- Siamese

No pointed white rabbit can produce orange pigment; therefore, the points are always either black, blue, chocolate, or lilac. The resulting point colouration is sometimes in conjunction with a coat pattern, such as: white agouti, marten, broken, Vienna, or harlequin. (Such coats may not be recognized for showing.)

=== Rabbit breeds ===
Breeds of rabbit that include varieties with point colouration include:

- Altex
- American Fuzzy Lop
- English Angora
- French Angora
- Californian
- Cashmere Lop
- Himalayan
- Holland Lop
- Jersey Wooly
- Lionhead
- Mini Lop
- Mini Rex
- Mini Satin^{(in development)}
- Netherland Dwarf
- Pointed Beveren
- Rex
- Satin
- Satin Angora

=== In fancy (domestic) rats ===
The C - Albino locus gene causes dilution of yellow and black colouration, causing Himalayan or Siamese markings depending on the allele affected.

Point colours in rats include:

- Sepia
- Seal Point
- Blue Point

=== In guinea pigs ===
There is only one type of guinea pig with a pointed coat. It is called the Himalayan, has either Black (a very dark brown) or Chocolate, tipped on the Ears, Nose, and Feet.
