= Brainstem auditory evoked potential =

Aspect of neuroanatomy

- ICD-9-CM: 794.09
- MedlinePlus: 003926
- eMedicine: 1137451

In human neuroanatomy, brainstem auditory evoked potentials (BAEPs), also called brainstem auditory evoked responses (BAERs), are very small auditory evoked potentials in response to an auditory stimulus, which are recorded by electrodes placed on the scalp. They reflect neuronal activity in the auditory nerve, cochlear nucleus, superior olive, and inferior colliculus of the brainstem. They typically have a response latency of no more than six milliseconds with an amplitude of approximately one microvolt.

Due to their small amplitude, 500 or more repetitions of the auditory stimulus are required in order to average out the random background electrical activity. Although it is possible to obtain a BAEP to a pure tone stimulus in the hearing range, a more effective auditory stimulus contains a range of frequencies in the form of a short sharp click.

Long and Allen were the first to report the abnormal BAEPs in an alcoholic woman who recovered from acquired central hypoventilation syndrome. These investigators hypothesized that their patient's brainstem was poisoned, but not destroyed, by her chronic alcoholism.

BAER testing is also recommended for dogs and white cats.
