= Australian Mist =

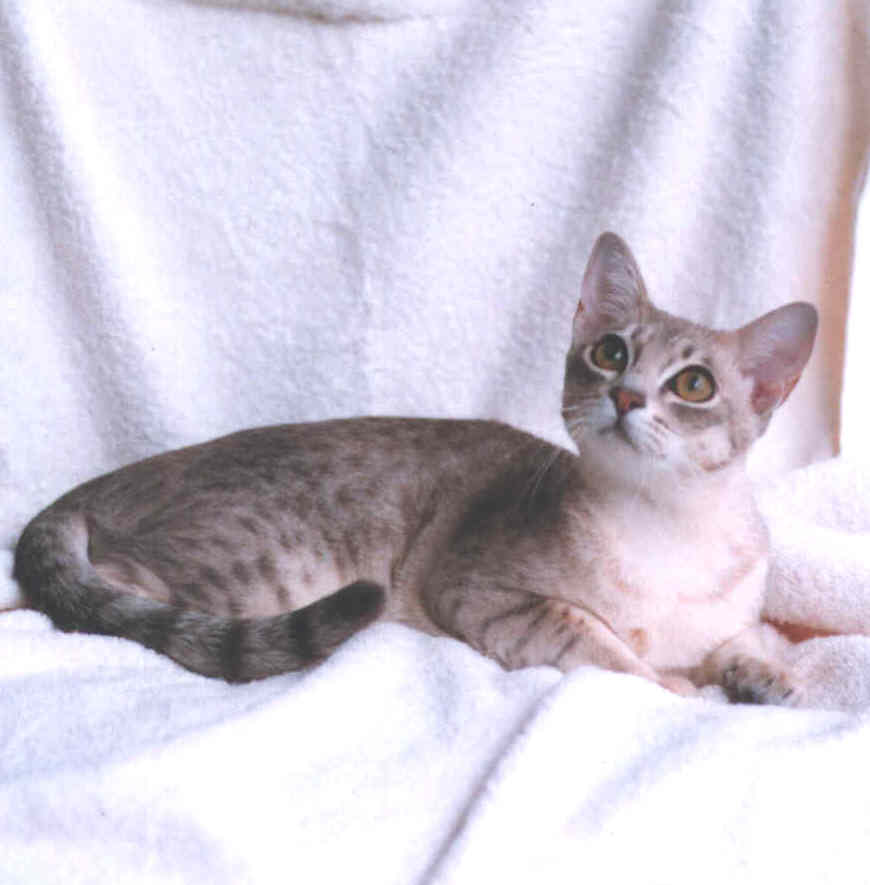
- A blue spotted tabby Australian Mist female
- Other names: Spotted Mist
- Origin: Australia
- Foundation bloodstock: Abyssinian, Burmese, domestic shorthair spotted tabby

Breed standards
- TICA: standard
- GCCF: standard
- Other: WNCA

The Australian Mist (formerly known as Spotted Mist) is a breed of cat developed in Australia. It is a cross between the Abyssinian, the Burmese, and domestic shorthair spotted tabby cats. The Australian Mist has a distinct and unique faded coat appearance hence the name. Their eyes are green, and they bear eumelanistic colours and spotted or 'marbled' tabby patterns in their coats.

== History ==
This breed was developed in Australia in 1977 by Dr. Truda Straede with a gene-pool of approximately 30 foundation cats. Dr. Straede submitted a plan to the Royal Agricultural Society of New South Wales Cat Club (RASCC) for a breed with black ('brown'), blue, chocolate, and lilac colourings. The distinctive 'misty' coat was obtained by crossbreeding domestic shorthair (non-pedigreed) spotted tabby, Burmese, and Abyssinian cats. The sepia point of the Burmese is combined with the ticking gene of Abyssinian and with a spotted tabby coat. The first generation of the breed was accepted into the RASCC experimental category in May 1980 and in April 1986 the fourth generation was accepted as the 'Spotted Mist'. In June 1997 the marbled variety of the breed was accepted by the RASCC and Waratah State Cat Alliance (WNCA). Due to the newly accepted marbled variety it was decided by the Co-ordinating Cat Council of Australia (CCCA) and the Australian Cat Federation (ACF) to rename the breed — in a unanimous decision the name 'Australian Mist' was chosen.

== Breed recognition ==
On 1 January 1999 the breed received championship status with the New Zealand Cat Fancy (NZCF). The breed was accepted for championship status by the World Cat Federation (WCF) in August 2004. The first Australian Mists were imported into the United Kingdom in 2007. The breed was given preliminary recognition by the Governing Council of the Cat Fancy (GCCF) in October 2011. It was accepted at championship status in The International Cat Association (TICA) on 1 May 2014. It gained championship status with the GCCF in February 2017. The breed is not yet recognised by the Fédération Internationale Féline (FIFe).

=== Distribution ===
Due to the novel status of the breed outside Australia most Australian Mist catteries are located in Australia; however, there are a few in the UK and USA. Breeding cats have also been sent to Norway.

== Appearance ==
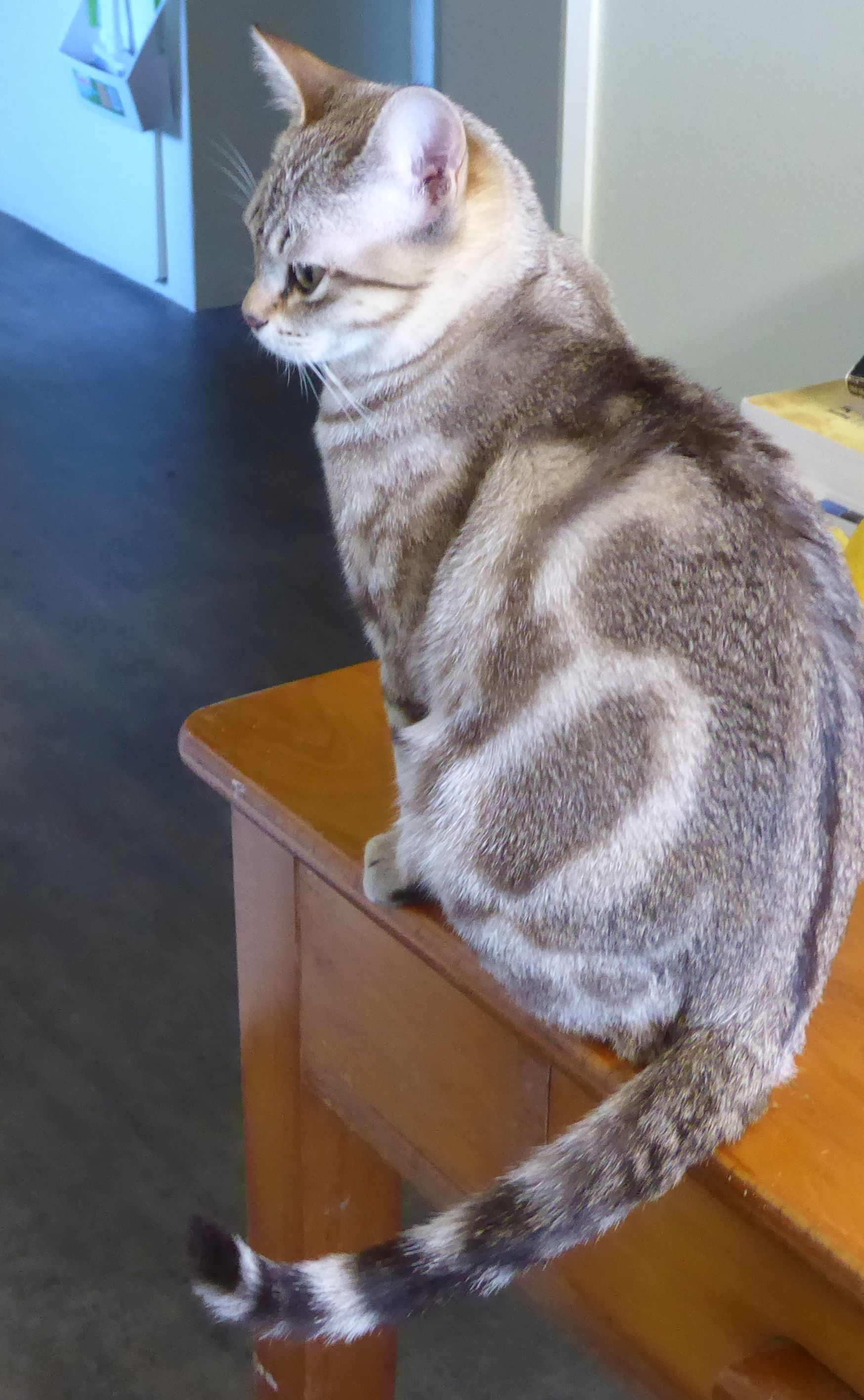
Brown marbled Australian Mist

The Australian Mist is a medium-sized short-haired cat, with a round and medium-sized head, a broad nose, and large green eyes. Eye colour can range in any shade of green from chartreuse to aquamarine. Ears are moderately large with a rounded tip to them. The coat is short to medium in length and feels smooth and silky.

=== Coat ===
==== Coat patterns ====
The coat pattern consists of three aspects:

- the background colour, which is paler than the tabby pattern;
- the tabby pattern in the darkest base colour; and
- the appearance of wearing a misted veil, caused by random ticking in solid colour areas.

The legs and tail are ringed or barred, and the face and neck also have lines of colour.

There are two types of coat patterns in the Australian Mist: the original spotted coat which has distinctive spots that are symmetrical, and the 'marbled' (blotched tabby) coat which has swirled patches and streaks on the coat. Both varieties should have the tabby M-shaped marking on the forehead and a ringed tail with a dark tip.

==== Coat colours ====
Australian Mists have a paler coat on the under-parts of the body which give it the distinctive mist appearance. Colour may not fully develop until the adult is at least two years old. Australian Mists do not have a solid colour as the agouti background gives them their distinctive look but the base colours in the cat are limited to all eumelanistic colours:

- black ('brown')
- blue
- chocolate
- lilac
- cinnamon ('gold')
- fawn ('peach')
- caramel (dilution modifier of either blue, lilac or fawn)

Phaeomelanistic colours are not allowed in any registry. The allowed coat patterns of these base colours are spotted or blotched ('marbled') tabby and the sepia point colouration.

== Health ==
Conditions commonly screened for in breeding Australian Mist cats include pyruvate kinase deficiency (PKD), feline hypokalaemic polymyopathy, neonatal isoerythrolysis, and progressive retinal atrophy.

== Gallery ==
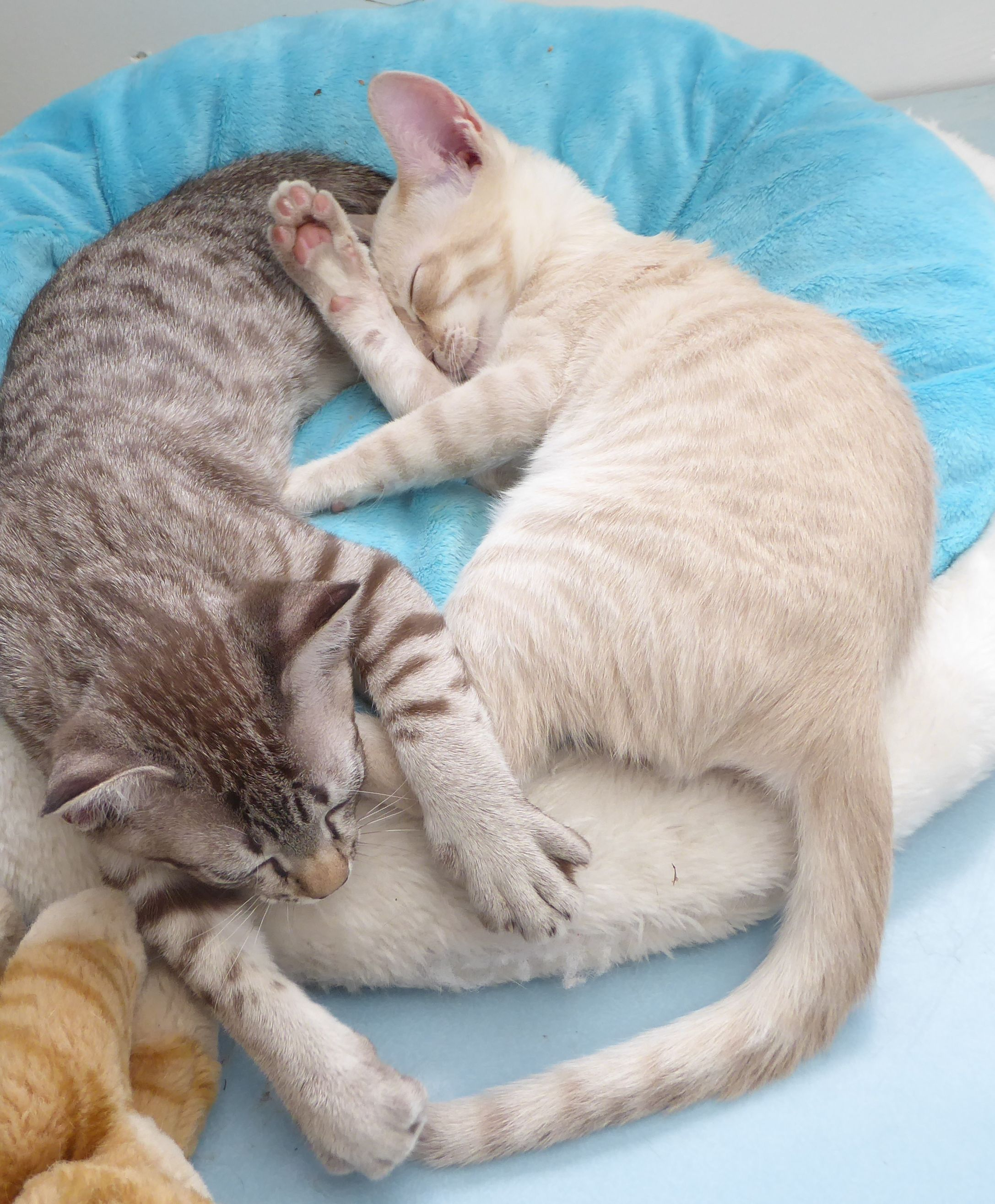
Chocolate (l) and cinnamon 'gold' (r) spotted tabby kittens

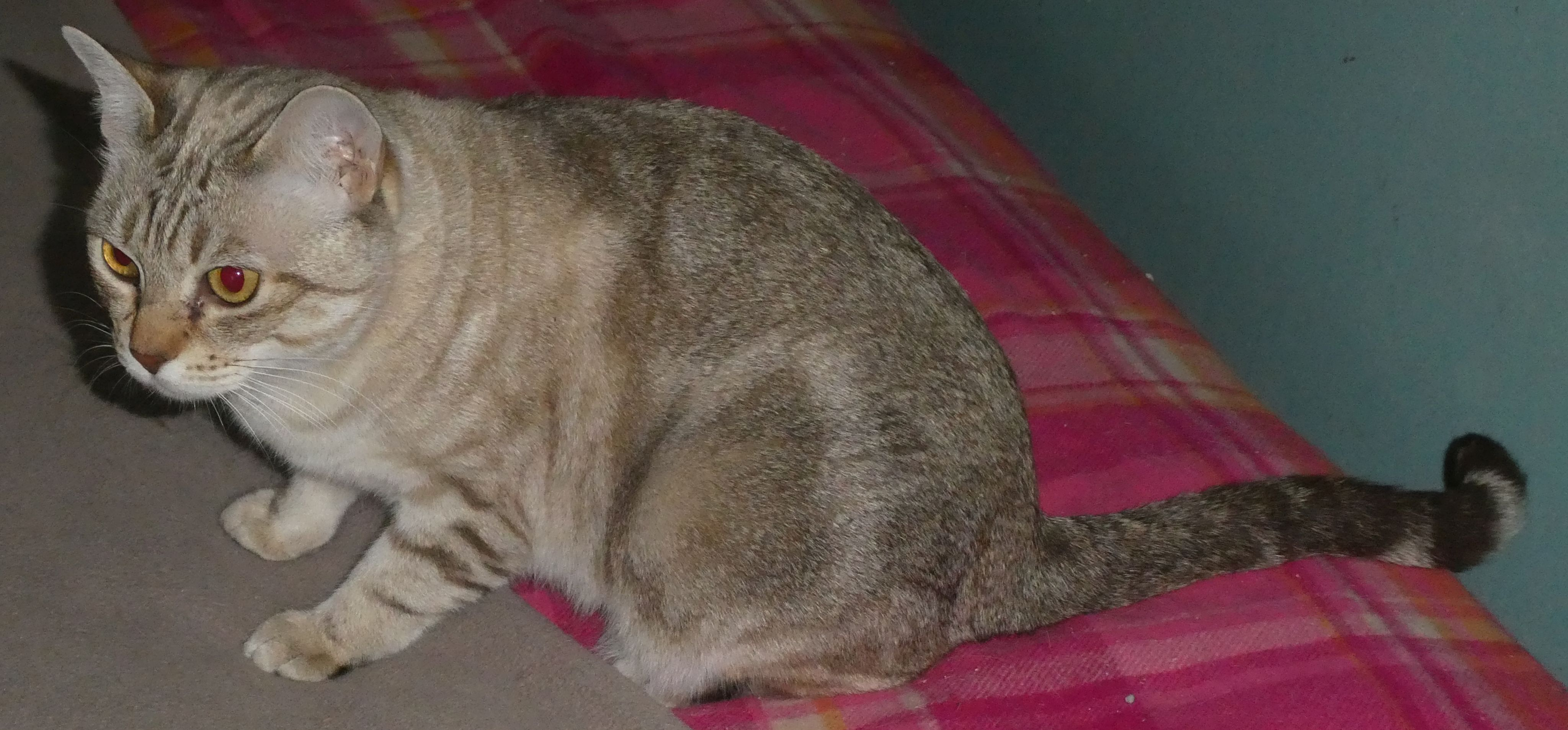
A chocolate marbled tabby

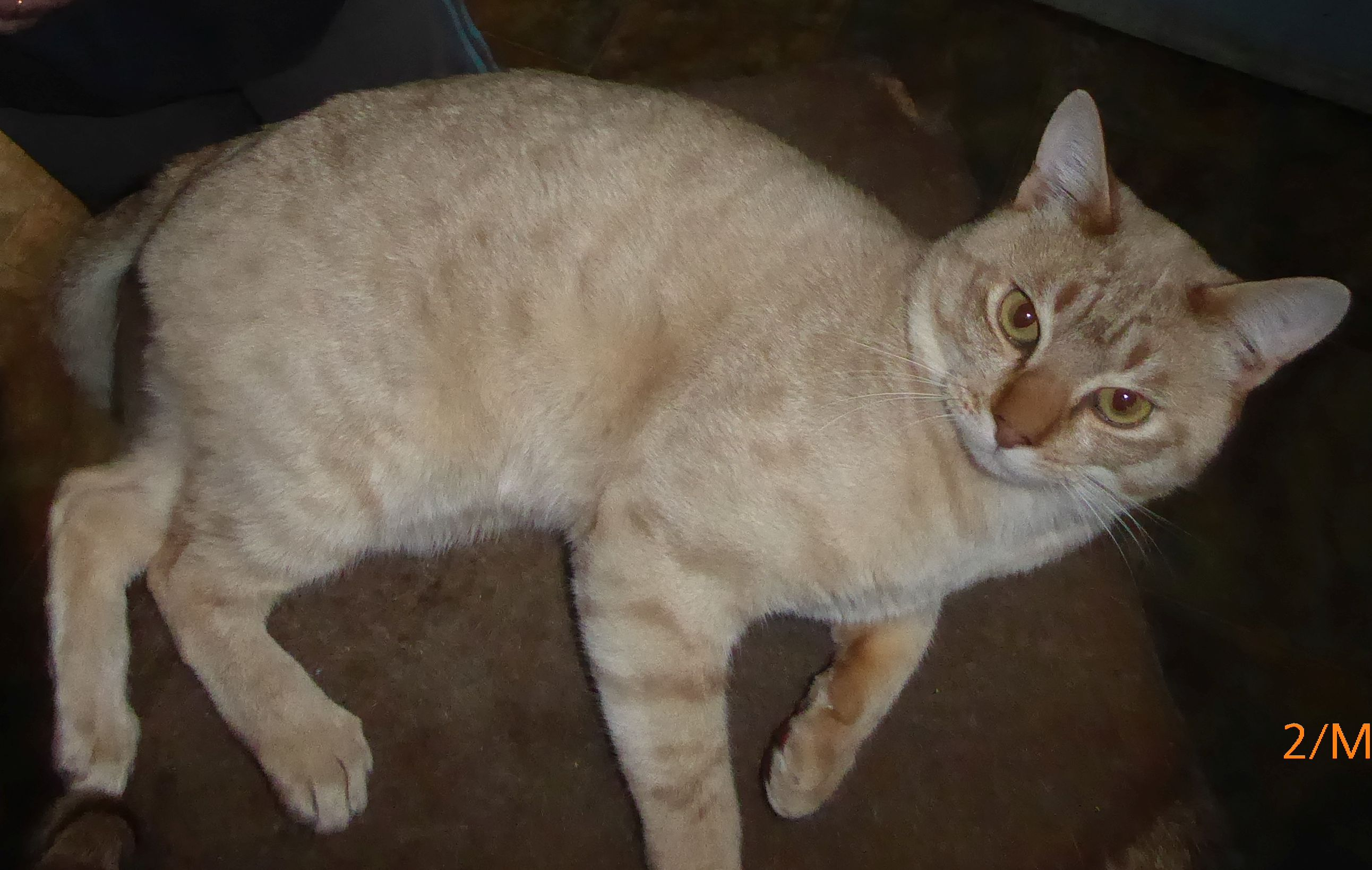
A mature cinnamon 'gold' spotted tabby male
