= Cymric cat =

Breed of cat

Cymric
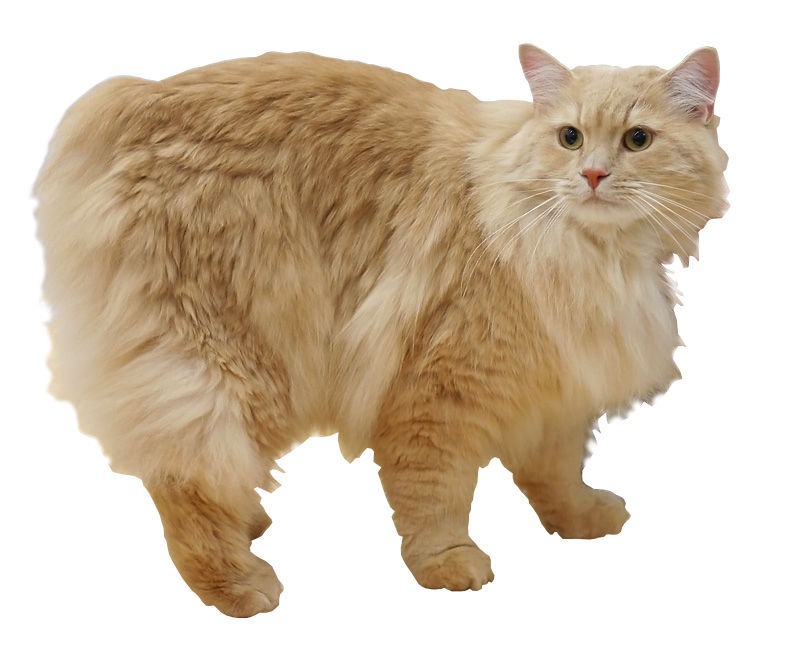
- Cream tabby "rumpy riser" adult male
- Other names: Manx Longhair, Longhair Manx, Semi-longhair Manx Variant, long-haired Manx
- Origin: Canada (breeding programme), Isle of Man (Manx stock)

Breed standards
- CFA: standard
- FIFe: standard
- TICA: standard
- WCF: standard
- ACF: standard
- ACFA/CAA: standard
- CCA-AFC: standard
- GCCF: standard
- NZCF: standard
- SACC: standard
- Other: AACE

Notes
- Whether recognised as a separate Cymric breed, a Cymric sub-breed of Manx or simply a coat length variant of Manx, varies from registry to registry.

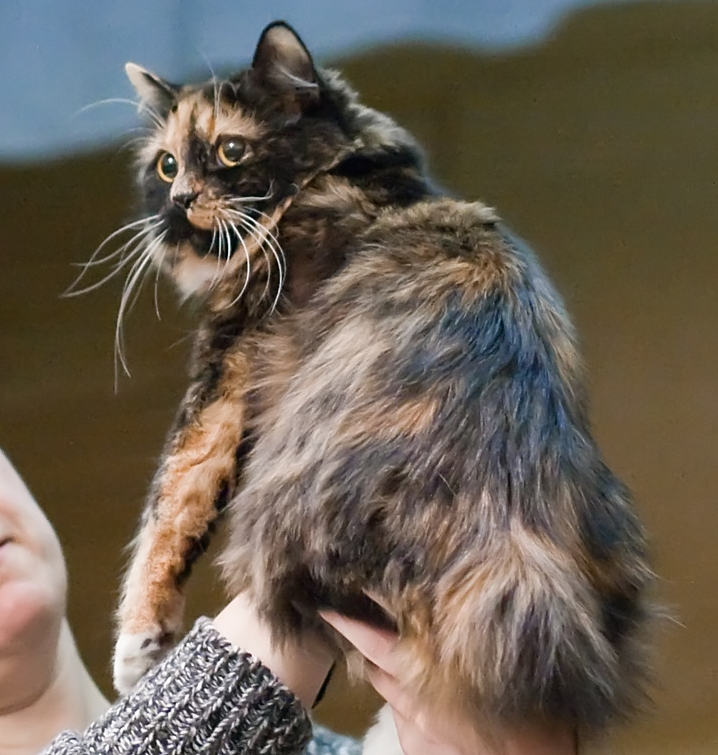
Black tortoiseshell "stumpy" female

The Cymric (/ˈkɪmrɪk/ KIM-rik, /ˈkʌmrɪk/ KUM-rik) is a Canadian cat breed. Some cat registries consider the Cymric a semi-long-haired variety of the Manx breed, rather than a separate breed. Except for the length of fur, in all other respects, the two varieties are the same, and kittens of either sort may appear in the same litter. The name comes from Cymru (Welsh pronunciation: [ˈkəmrɨ]), the indigenous Welsh name of Wales, even though the breed is not associated with Wales. The name may have been chosen to provide a "Celtic" sounding moniker for the breed. While the breed's Manx bloodline originated from the Isle of Man, the long-haired variant is claimed to have been developed in Canada. The breed is called the Longhair Manx or a similar name by some registries.

== History ==
According to the Isle of Man records, the taillessness trait of the Manx (and ultimately the Cymric) began as a mutation among the island's domestic cat population. Given the island's closed environment and small gene pool, the dominant gene that decided the cats' taillessness was easily passed from one generation to the next, along with the gene for long hair. Long-haired kittens had been born to Manx cats on the Isle of Man, but had always been discarded by breeders as "mutants". Then, in the 1960s, similar kittens were born in Canada and were intentionally bred. This was the start of the increase in Cymric popularity. It took many years for cat associations to recognise the Cymric as a breed of its own. While the Manx was recognised in the 1920s, the Cymric was not shown until the 1960s and did not gain popularity until the mid-1970s.

The Fédération Internationale Féline (FIFe, since 2006), World Cat Federation (WCF), Canadian Cat Association (CCA-AFC), Australian Cat Federation (ACF), New Zealand Cat Fancy (NZCF), Southern Africa Cat Council (SACC), American Cat Fanciers Association (ACFA, of the US East Coast), and Cat Fanciers' Federation (CFF, in the US Northeast) consider the Cymric a separate breed. The Cat Aficionado Association (CAA) of China does also, by virtue of the CAA having adopted all the breed standards of its Western partner, ACFA; it is unknown if any Cymric breeders are actually in China.

The International Cat Association (TICA) recognises the Cymric as a variety of Manx, not a separate breed with its own standards. Also, simply covering it in their Manx breed standards, the US-based Cat Fanciers' Association (CFA), the Co-ordinating Cat Council of Australia (CCCA), and the UK's Governing Council of the Cat Fancy (GCCF) recognise the variety as the long-haired Manx rather than a Cymric (the CFA and CCCA call it the Manx Longhair, while GCCF uses the term Semi-longhair Manx Variant). The ACF formerly took this route, calling it the Longhaired Manx, but recognised it as a separate breed (Cymric) at the beginning of 2015, using the GCCF Manx standard (aside from coat length).

== Appearance ==
=== Body ===
The Cymric is a muscular, compact, medium to large cat with a sturdy bone structure, but the lack of a tail can make them appear small. Males of this Canadian cat breed can weigh up to 5 kg (12 lb), while, female usually weigh between 4–5 kg (8–12 lb). They have a rounded appearance and their front legs are shorter than their hind legs. Their eyes come in various shades such as amber, green, hazel, copper, gold, yellow, and orange. Cymrics also exhibit tall ears that are angled slightly outwards and are adorned with moderate ear tufts.

=== Coat ===
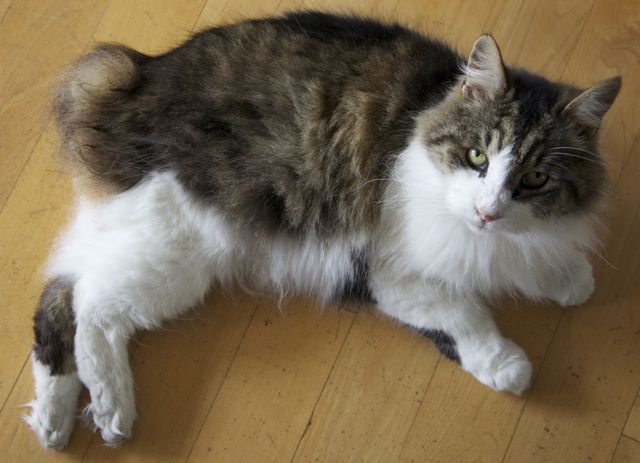
Black tabby and white "stumpy" male

Their semi-long, dense, and resilient double coat consists of a shorter, soft undercoat (known as an awn). The Cymric cat's coat is notably long and voluminous around the ruff, extending downward to create a shirtfront. Additionally, the coat extends onto the upper portion of the hindquarters above the hock, creating breeches, a term derived from the visual effect of a cat's fur replicating traditional, baggy knee-length pants. In the show ring, the quality of a cat's coat has greater significance than its colour or markings, even though Cymric can display a wide array of colours and patterns.

=== Tail ===
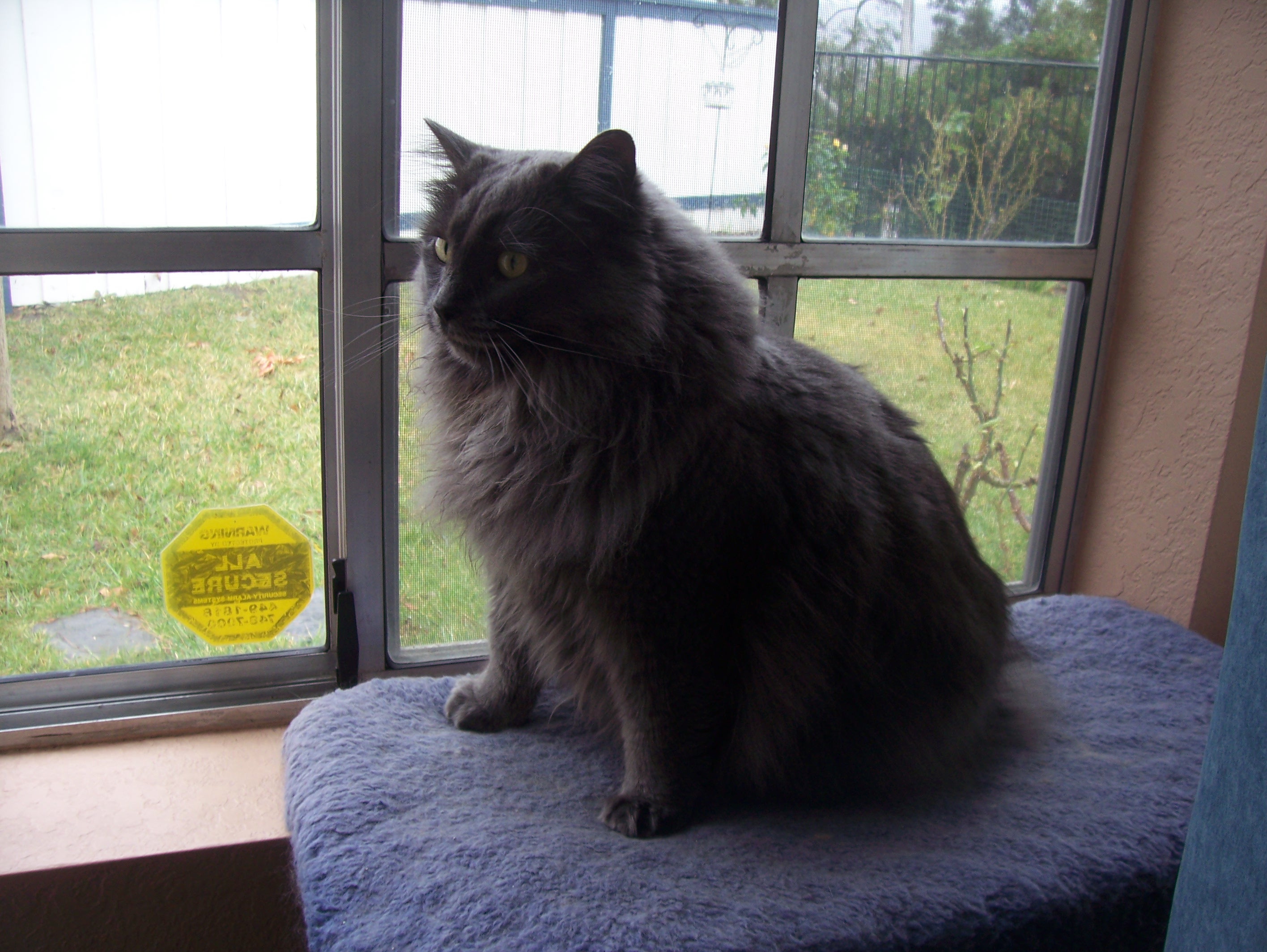
A large female

Similar to their parent breed, kittens in a Cymric litter can have various tail lengths and are classified by the proportion:

- Rumpy - Completely lacks a tail with no extension of the tailbone
- Rumpy Riser - Up to three vertebrae at the end of the spine that will rise when pet
- Stumpy - Up to five vertebrae at the end of the spine, resulting in a small stump
- Longies - A tail longer than five vertebrae but is shorter than a full length tail

Rumpies are the most valued for cat show purposes and is the only show cat type in some organisations.

=== Isle of Man Longhair (tailed variant) ===
The Isle of Man Longhair is a fully tailed Cymric cat, i.e. a cat of Cymric (and thus Manx) stock, with Cymric features, but without expression of the Manx taillessness gene. It is presently only recognised as a separate breed by the New Zealand Cat Fancy (NZCF) with a breed standard. Coat colours are limited to those acceptable in the British Shorthair, and require the doubled and thick, long coat of the Cymric. In other international registries, such cats are designated "Tailed Cymric" or "Tailed Manx Longhair", only recognised as breeding stock (they are important as such, since breeding two tailless Manx or Cymrics together results in birth defects), and cannot be show cats.

== Health ==
The genetic mutation that gives both the Cymric and Manx their unusual tails is also responsible for other health complications like spina bifida, a spinal defect that can result in neurological issues whether that is difficult with movement or waste elimination. A rabbit-like hop can sometimes be seen in Cymric cats due to the spinal deformity. Most of the time, these problems are identified before six months of age.

The gene that gives the Cymric and Manx their unusual tails can also be lethal. Kittens who inherit two copies of the tailless gene die before birth and are reabsorbed in the womb. Since these kittens make up about 25 percent of all kittens, litters are usually small. Even cats who inherit only one copy of the gene can have what is called Manx syndrome. Not every Cymric with a short spine has problems or Manx syndrome. It is simply an attribute of the Manx gene, and its expression cannot be entirely prevented.

Following updated genetic research, both the ACF and (less stringently) the GCCF impose special breeding restrictions on Manx cats (including the Cymric, however named and classified), for animal welfare reasons.
