= Singapura cat =

Breed of cat

Singapura
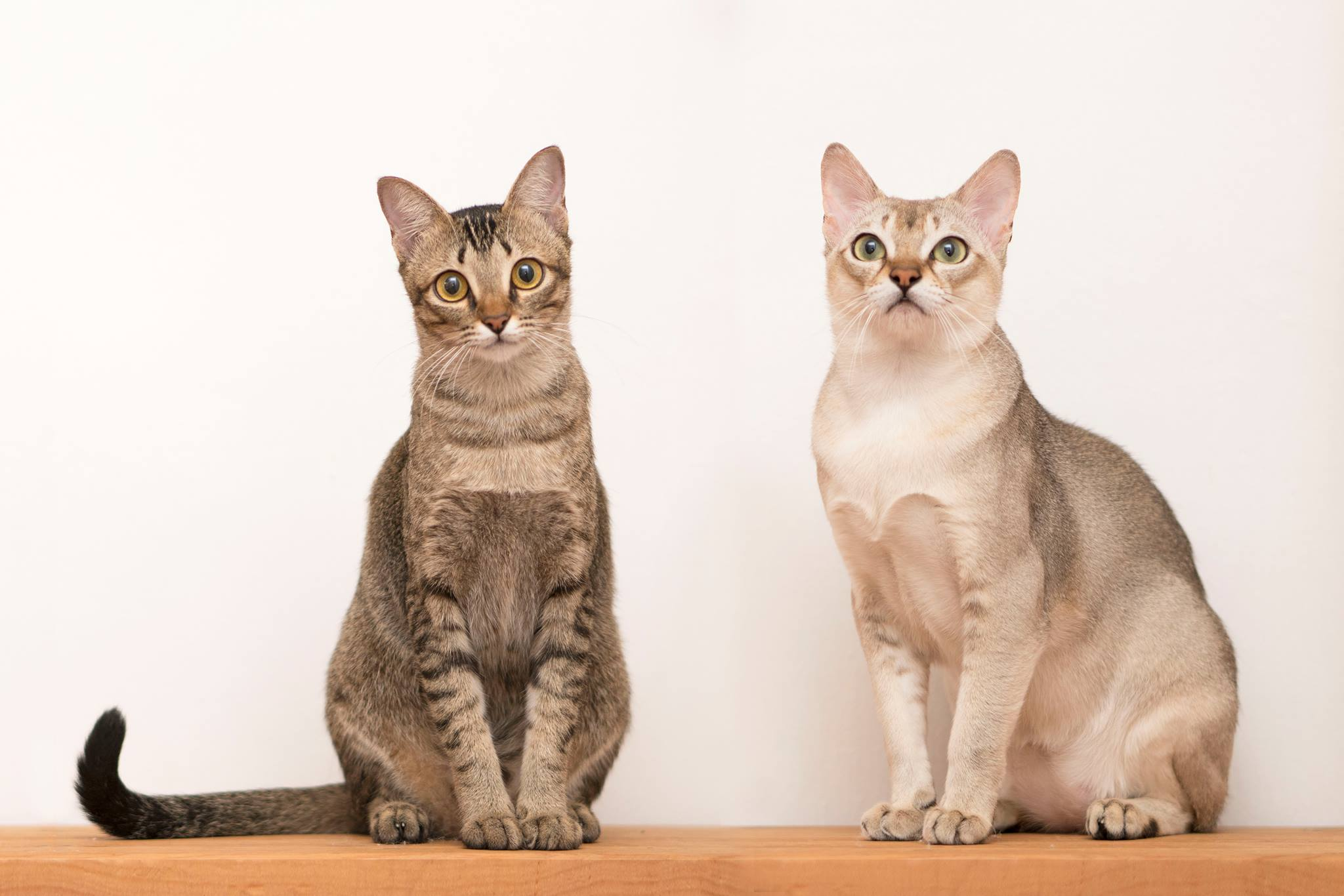
- Raw Singapura and Pedigreed Singapura side by side
- Other names: Drain Cat; Kucinta; Kopitiam Cat
- Origin: Singapore

Breed standards
- CFA: standard
- TICA: standard
- ACFA/CAA: standard
- CCA-AFC: standard
- GCCF: standard

The Singapura, or Kucinta in Singapore, is noted for its large eyes and ears, ticked coat, and blunt tail. The majority of breed associations consider the Singapura to be the lightest and shortest pedigreed breed of cat. (Note: Some cat associations include the Munchkin cat in their registries, which is a shorter breed of cat than the Singapura. However, most pedigree cat associations have refused to allow the Munchkin into their registries due to concerns about the welfare of that breed, see Munchkin_cat#Welfare_concern) Reportedly established from three "drain cats" imported from Singapore in the 1970s, it was later revealed that the cats were originally sent to Singapore from the United States before being exported back to the US. Investigations by the Cat Fanciers' Association (CFA) concluded that no wrongdoing had occurred and the Singapura kept its status as a natural breed.

== History ==
=== Foundation ===
In 1975, after working in Singapore, Tommy and Hal Meadow returned to the US with what they say were three local brown-ticked cats. These three cats, a pair of male and female kittens from the same litter and another young female, were the foundation used to establish the Singapura. The breed takes its name from the Malay name for Singapore. In 1981 a breeder visited Singapore and chanced upon a cat fitting the profile of the Singapura (with the exception of the tail) in the local Society for the Prevention of Cruelty to Animals. The cat was imported to the US and adopted into the breeding program.

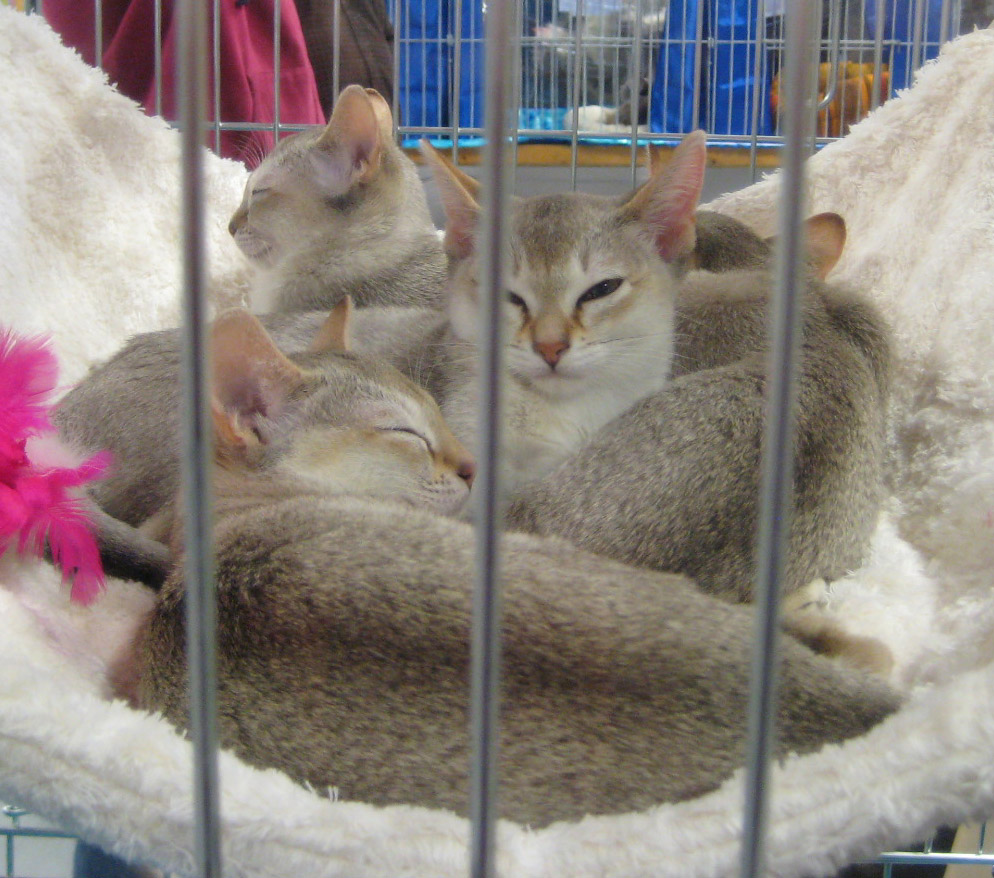
Singapuras at a cat show

The Singapura was accepted for registration by the TICA in 1979 for championship competition and by CFA in 1982 and granted championship status in 1988. During this period, breeders found that the occasional litter would have a solid coloured kitten, caused by the recessive gene for solid colour. In a desire for the Singapura to breed true, many breeders chose to do test matings to pinpoint and remove from their breeding programs individuals with the recessive gene. It was discovered that two of the three foundation cats carried this gene.

=== Controversy ===
In 1987, while on a cat finding trip to Singapore, American breeder Gerry Mayes discovered importation papers which revealed that the three foundation cats were actually taken into Singapore from the US in 1974. Lucy Koh, a friend of Mayes, made efforts to correct the history of the Singapura presented by the Meadows but that went relatively unnoticed until 1990, when the Singapore Tourist Promotion Board (currently Singapore Tourism Board) started a campaign to use the Singapura as a national mascot. Reporter Sandra Davie was informed of the discrepancy and published an article about it in the national broadsheet The Straits Times.

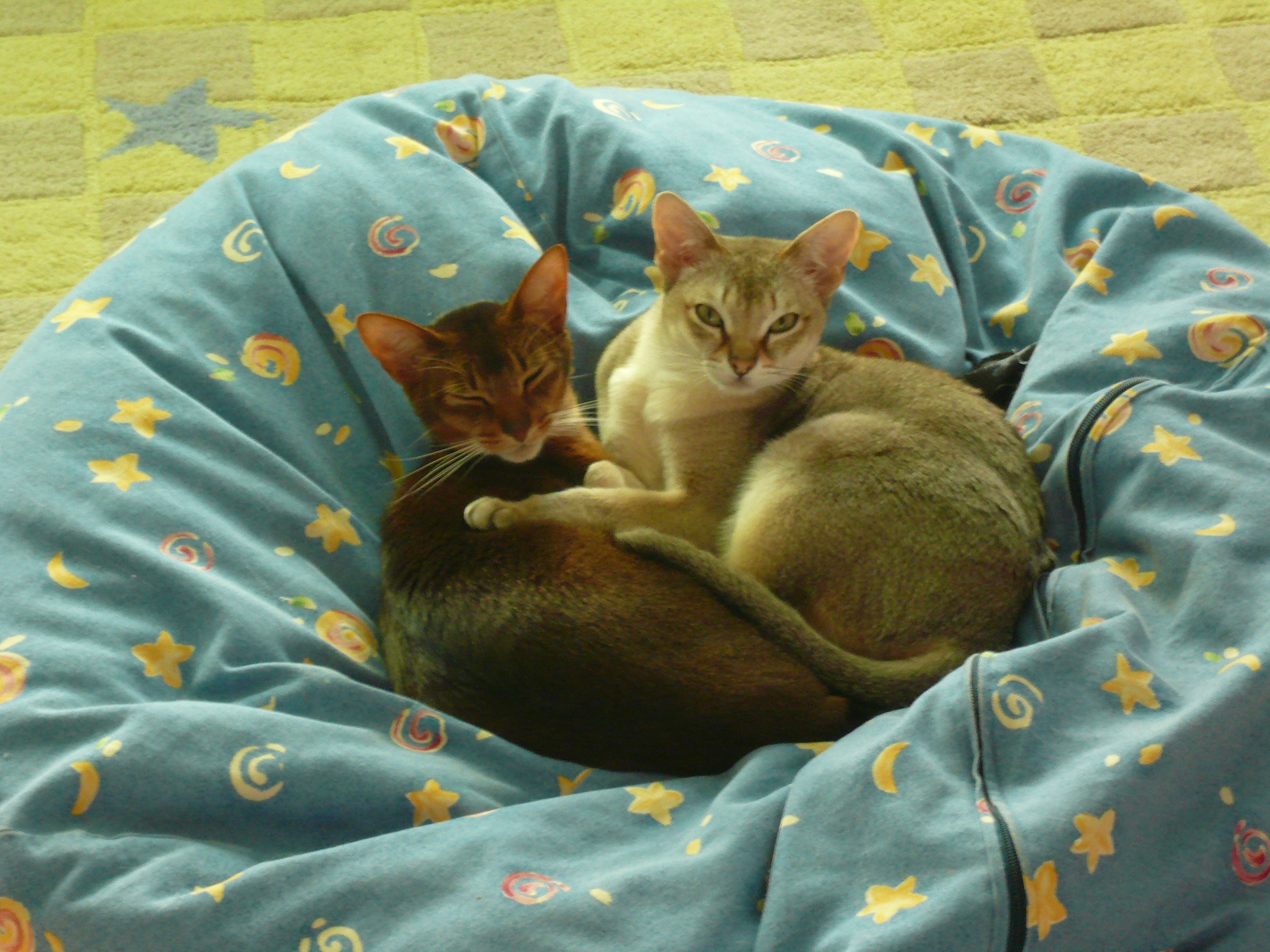
An Abyssinian (left) and Singapura

Because the cats were registered as Abyssinians in the import certificates, and because the Meadows had been breeders of Abyssinian, Burmese, and Siamese, some have speculated that the Singapura is a Burmese/Abyssinian cross and it has even been described as such by CFA Judges. The resemblance of some Burmese/Abyssinian cross to the Singapura, as well as the Singapura's small litter size, which is uncommon in natural breeds, added more doubts to the Meadows' story.

The CFA investigated the incident at the request of a Singapura breed club. In the investigation, Hal Meadow told the investigation board that the three cats were grandchildren of four local cats he sent back to the US during a previous sensitive business trip to Singapore in 1971, contradicting the Meadows' earlier claim of the foundation cats' origin. Apparently Tommy Meadow lied about it to conceal the secret trip. The CFA found no wrongdoing and kept the Singapura's status as a natural breed. CFA's Joan Miller said that "Whether they mated on the streets of Singapore or whether they mated in Michigan, it doesn't really matter." Referring to the cat picked up from the SPCA in 1981, she said that "In addition, there is at least one documented cat that is behind many Singapura pedigrees and it was picked up at the pound. Even with none of the cats the Meadows brought in we still have a legitimate cat from Singapore behind our Singapuras."

Recent studies in 2007 based on feline DNA showed that there are very few genetic differences between the Singapura and Burmese, adding support to the claim that the Singapura is not a natural breed.

=== Singapuras in Singapore ===
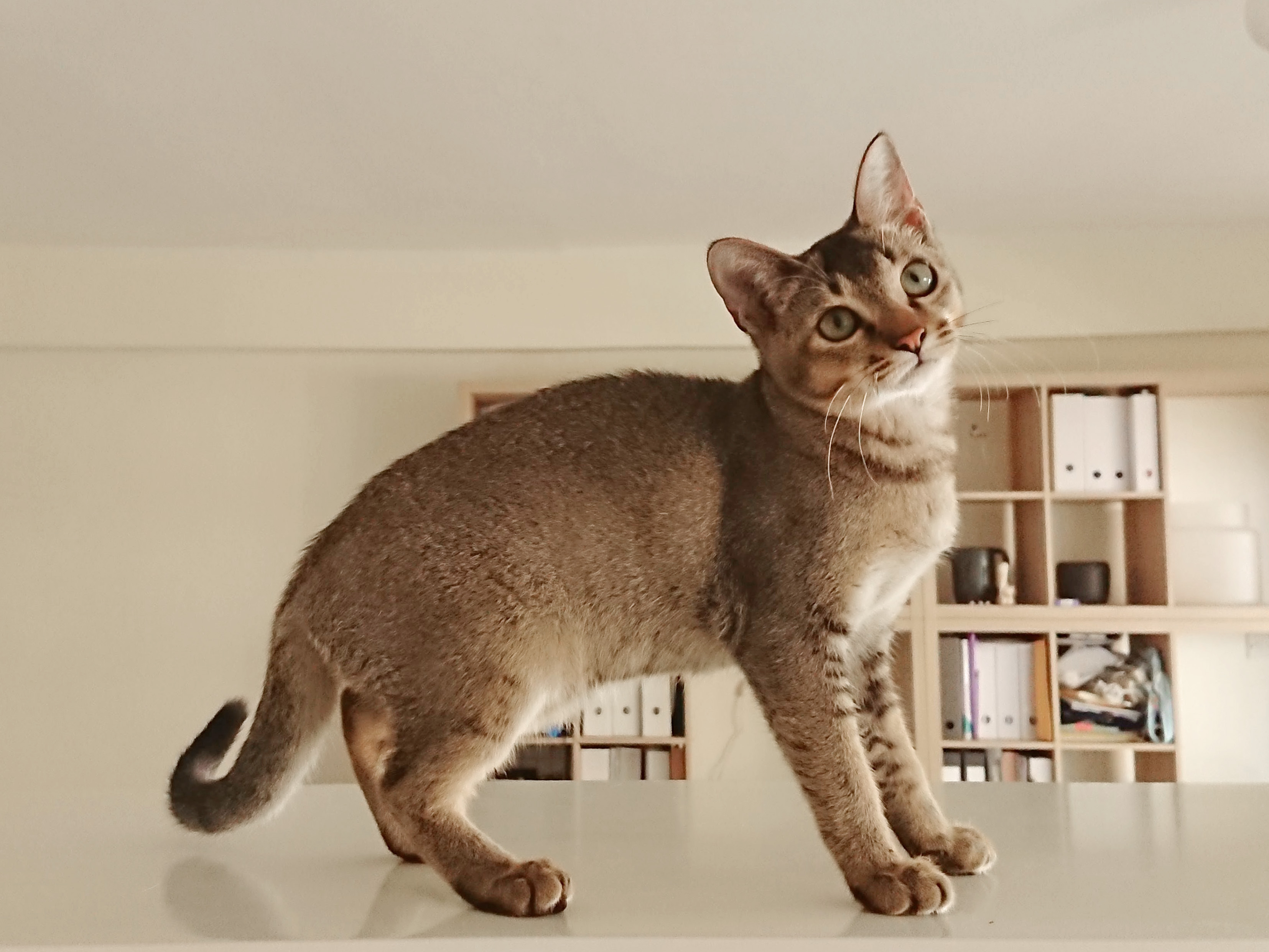
Common Singapore Drain Cat

The Singapore Tourist and Promotion Board (STPB) proceeded with the decision to use the breed (advertised under the name Kucinta) as a tourism mascot after CFA concluded its investigation. The name Kucinta is an amalgamation of the Malay words kucing (cat) and cinta (love) and taken from the winning entry in a naming competition. Incidentally, Kucinta also means "The one I love" in Malay. Sculptures of the Singapura can be found by the Singapore River.

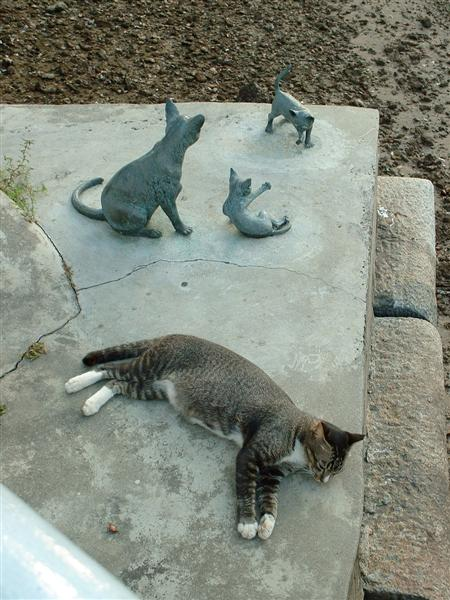
A local brown tabby lying beside the Kucinta sculptures by the Singapore River

While in Singapore brown moggies with ticked coats can occasionally be seen, few if any resemble the Singapura, with the majority of cats being bobtailed tabbies, tortoiseshells or bicolour, and the move by the STPB is seen by locals to be an advertising move based on the popularity of the breed among tourists at that time.

In 2004, the Singapore Zoo hosted a temporary exhibit of Singapura cats in celebration of the nation's 39th National Day. Four Singapura cats were loaned by their owners for the event.

== Breed registration ==
=== Popularity ===
Singapuras are a relatively rare breed worldwide. In the 2024 statistics of FIFe, one of the major global cat registries, the breed ranked at position 44 out of 54 breeds in popularity, comprising 0,04% of their total registered kittens that year, which translates to 35 cats.

== Characteristics ==
=== Appearance ===
The Singapura is moderately stocky and muscular with a very short and fine coat. The Singapura is the smallest cat breed in the world to be widely accepted on breed registries. A full-grown female Singapura cat usually weighs 1.8 kilograms (4.0 lb) while the male weighs 2.7 kilograms (6.0 lb). The large, slightly pointed, and deep cupped ears together with the large almond-shaped eyes are characteristics of the breed. The tail is slender, slightly shorter than the length of the body and has a blunt tip.

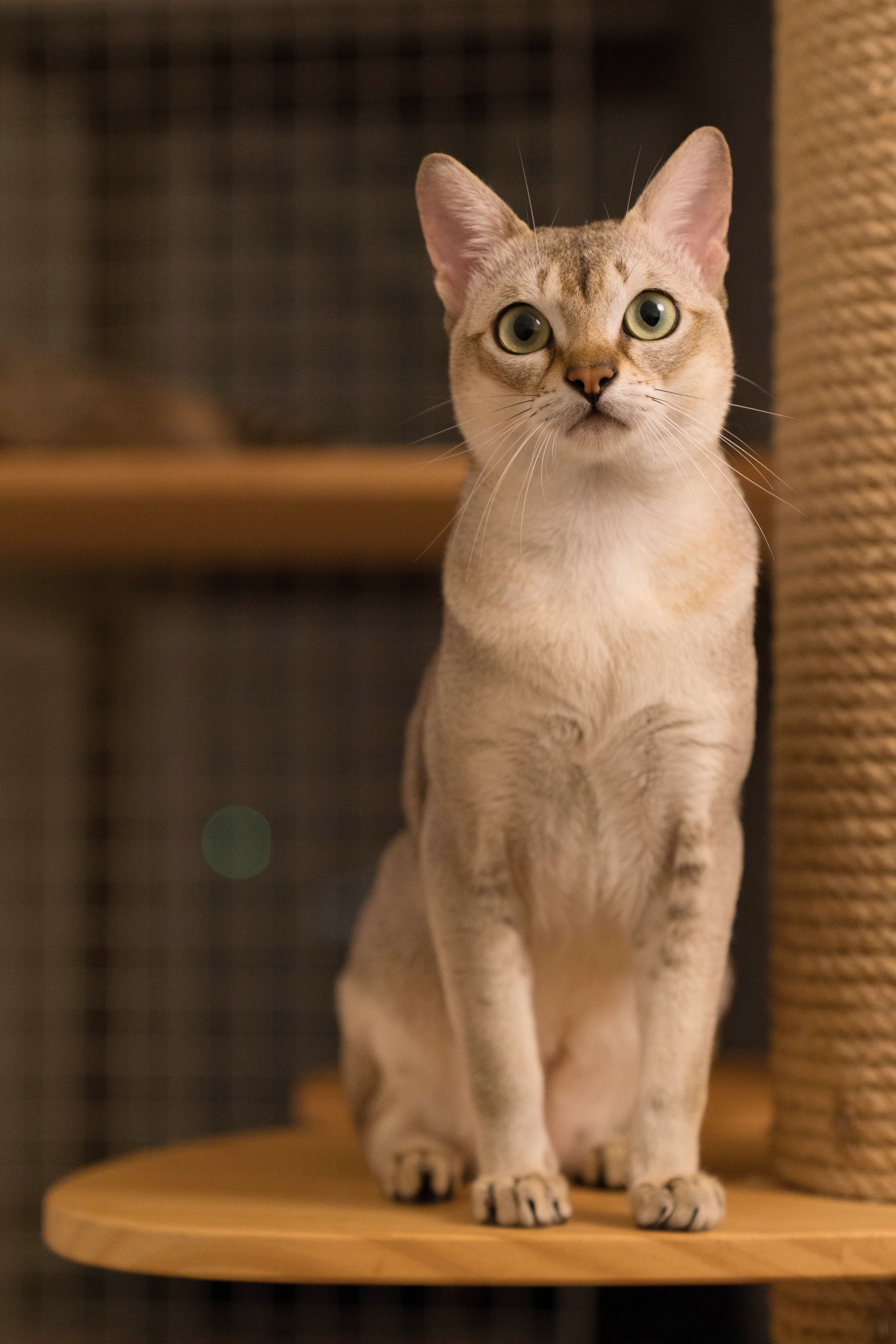
Singapura cat in Singapore

The breed's coat pattern is that of a ticked tabby. That is, individual hair strands have alternating sections of dark and light colour, typically two dark bands separated by two light bands, with a dark colour at the tip. The underside, including the chest, muzzle and chin, takes the colour of the light bands. The Singapura is recognized by cat registries in only one colour, the sepia agouti, described as "dark brown ticking on a warm old ivory ground colour".

== Health ==
Of concern to breeders is the condition known as uterine inertia, an inability to expel the foetus due to weak muscles. This condition was present in one of the foundation cats and appears in some Singapura females today. Individuals with uterine inertia may require deliveries to be made by caesarean section. Another issue that affects the breed is pyruvate kinase deficiency (PKD), which leads to haemolytic anaemia. Typical symptoms includes lethargy, diarrhoea, lack of appetite, poor coat quality, weight loss and jaundice. A test is available that can determine whether a cat is affected, a carrier, or clear of the disease. Singapuras with PKD can usually live a normal life.

Some breeders have shown concern regarding the lack of genetic diversity in the breed due to inbreeding caused by a small gene pool. Researchers who completed the 2007 DNA study found that the Singapura (along with the Burmese) have the least genetic diversity among the 22 breeds studied. The possibility of outcrossing with another breed to increase the genetic diversity had been raised among CFA breeders, but not many were receptive to the idea, preferring to use Singapuras from around the world that are not so closely related to the CFA line. In April 2013, UK's Governing Council of the Cat Fancy started allowing outcrossing for the breed. Individuals chosen have to meet certain health and appearance requirements.

The Singapura has one of the lowest heterozygosity values.
