= Associazione Nazionale Felina Italiana =

Italian registry for catteries and cat breeding

Italian National Feline Association
- Associazione Nazionale Felina Italiana
- Abbreviation: AFNI
- Predecessor: Società Felina Italiana (Italian Feline Society); Federazione Felina Italiana (Italian Feline Federation)
- Formation: c. 1934; 92 years ago
- Type: NGO
- Purpose: Cat registry
- Location(s): Via Giambattista Gropello, 12; 10138 Turin, Italy
- Coordinates: 45.074858°N 7.664318°E
- Region served: Italy
- Members: Private persons
- Official language: Italian
- President: Francesco Cinque
- Vice president: Dario Domancich
- Secretary: Diana Di Natale
- Treasurer: Rossella Mercadante
- Main organ: Laura Bocchi, Hana Klein, Carlo Luzi, Laura Marchese, Francesca Serena
- Parent organization: Fédération Internationale Féline
- Website: www.anfitalia.it

The Associazione Nazionale Felina Italiana (ANFI; Italian National Feline Association) is the Italian official registry association for catteries and cat breeding. It was formed in 1934 and is currently recognized by the Italian Ministerial decree dated 9 June 2005. Every year it organizes cat shows all over the country.

ANFI is one of the founding members of the Fédération Internationale Féline (FIFe).

== History ==
The origin of the association dates back to 1934 when a group of enthusiasts began to organize the first cat shows in the cities of Turin, Milan, and Florence. These cat shows, being a novelty in Italy, aroused a great interest and continued until the beginning of the Second World War. The activities of the association resumed from 1946 when the Società Felina Italiana (Italian Feline Society) was founded. Later the name was changed to Federazione Felina Italiana (Italian Feline Federation) and, finally, Associazione Nazionale Felina Italiana (Italian National Feline Association).

In 1949 the association sent a delegation to Paris which, together with the Fédération Féline Française (Franch Feline Federation) and the Royal Cat Society of Flander, contributed to the establishment of the Fédération Internationale Féline.

In June 1994 in Venice, ANFI organized the first world congress of feline associations with the patronage of the FIFe. The aim of this gathering was finding common rules for competition and for the breed standards at world level. The event was attended by representatives of the main associations dedicated to cats, for the first time ever reunited at the same table, and led to the foundation of the World Cat Congress.

== Purpose ==
ANFI's aims include:

- operating the national register of pedigree cats;
- training judges and experts;
- creating and organising cat shows;
- promoting cat health.
