= Governing Council of the Cat Fancy =

UK organisation to register pedigree cats

- Abbreviation: GCCF
- Formation: precursor in 1887, which merged into GCCF in 1910; 116 years ago
- Purpose: Cat fancy registry
- Region served: United Kingdom
- Official language: English
- Subsidiaries: The Cat Welfare Trust
- Affiliations: World Cat Congress
- Website: www.gccfcats.org
- Formerly called: National Cat Club; Cat Club; [British] Cat Fanciers’ Association

The Governing Council of the Cat Fancy (GCCF) is the oldest cat registry, established in 1910 and the largest organisation that registers pedigree cats in the United Kingdom. It is one of the nine members of the World Cat Congress, making it one of the major and reputable cat registries for pedigree registration of cat breeds worldwide.

== History ==
The Governing Council of the Cat Fancy (GCCF) traces its origins to the earliest days of the modern cat fancy, with its register dating back to the establishment of the National Cat Club in 1887; the first ever cat registry originating in England. Initially, the National Cat Club also served as the governing body for the cat fancy until 1910. In 1898, a rival registry, the Cat Club, was founded by Lady Marcus Beresford, but dissolved in 1903, giving way to the [British] Cat Fanciers’ Association. During this period, cats could only be registered with one of the two competing registries.

In 1910, these two organisations merged to form the GCCF, which became the unified governing body and registry for the cat fancy. Today, the GCCF operates as an independent body with approximately 150 member clubs, including both specialist breed clubs and regional area clubs. It was formally incorporated as a company on 5 November 2010, and is widely regarded as the original prototype for cat fancy registries worldwide.

== Organisation ==
The GCCF offices are based in Bridgwater and are staffed by people who deal with registrations, publications, show processing & title claims, agendas & minutes and correspondence from breeders, exhibitors, Clubs, Breed Advisory Committees and the general public. They also deal with complaints and breaches of rules, which can sometimes result in disciplinary action and even suspension from cat fancy activities. The GCCF is a member of The Cat Group and the World Cat Congress.

=== The Cat Welfare Trust ===
The GCCF has set up its own charity: The Cat Welfare Trust, which uses funds raised through the GCCF to find ways of improving the welfare of cats. To date the trust has granted thousands of pounds into key research projects in ringworm vaccination, the feline genome and chronic gingivostomatitis in cats.

== Cat shows and championship ==
The GCCF licenses cat shows put on by its affiliated clubs with about 135 shows per year. Pedigree cats shown at these shows can gain the titles Champion, Grand Champion, Imperial Grand Champion and Olympian. The latter having three levels, Bronze, Silver and Gold. The word Champion is replaced by Premier for neutered cats, and Master Cat for cats competing in household pets. The showing of non-pedigree cats (often referred to as "moggy" or Domestic Short/Longhair) and Pedigree Pets is also popular at GCCF shows. In April 2025, the GCCF introduced Kitten Champion (KC) and Kitten Master Cat (KMC) titles, allowing kittens to earn recognition in the show world.

The GCCF also co-ordinates its own show: the Supreme Cat Show, which is famous for being the world's largest cat show and often referred to as the feline equivalent of Crufts. Special awards of UK and Supreme Champion can be gained at this show only.

== Breeds ==
The top three most popular cat breeds registered in the GCCF are the British Shorthair, the Ragdoll and the Maine Coon. The GCCF registers around 20,000 pedigree cats each year, and currently recognises the following breeds (most in several different colours and patterns):

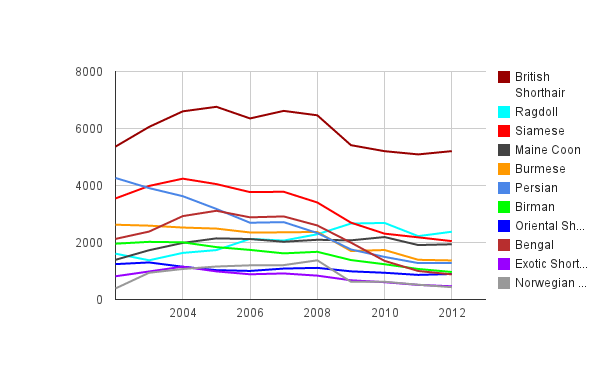
Registration numbers for the most popular breeds (2002-2012)

=== Section 1 ===
- Persian
- Exotic Shorthair

=== Section 2 ===
- Birman
- Maine Coon
- Nebelung
- Norwegian Forest Cat
- Ragdoll
- Siberian
- Somali
- Turkish Van
- Turkish Vankedisi
- Ragamuffin

=== Section 3 ===
- British Longhair
- British Shorthair
- Chartreux
- Manx
- Selkirk Rex

=== Section 4 ===
- Abyssinian
- Bengal
- Cornish Rex
- Devon Rex
- Egyptian Mau
- Korat
- LaPerm
- Lykoi
- Ocicat
- Russian
- Singapura
- Snowshoe
- Sokoke
- Sphynx
- Thai Lilac/Thai Pointed
- Toyger

=== Section 5 ===
- Asian (including Bombay and Burmilla)
- Tiffanie (Longhaired Asian)
- Australian Mist
- Burmese
- Tonkinese
- Suffolk

=== Section 6 ===
- Balinese
- Foreign White
- Oriental Bicolour
- Oriental Shorthair (several different varieties, including Havana Brown)
- Oriental Longhair
- Siamese

=== Breeds with registration-only status ===
- American Curl
- Cymric/Manx Longhair
- German Longhair
- Khao Manee
- Kurilian Bobtail
- Transylvanian
- Turkish Angora

== See also ==
- List of cat breeds
- List of cat registries
