= Australian Cat Federation =

Cat registry association in Australia

The Australian Cat Federation (ACF)
- Founded: 1972
- Founder: Harold Klopper
- Headquarters: Gold Coast, Queensland
- Services: Cat pedigree registry
- President: Judith Jordan
- Vice President: Scoot Andresen
- Secretary: Robbie Walker
- Treasurer: Janet Sterry
- Key people: Judith Jordan, Scoot Andresen, Robbie Walker, Janet Sterry
- Affiliations: World Cat Congress
- Website: www.acf.asn.au

The Australian Cat Federation (ACF) is an Australian cat registry organisation created in 1972. Its goal is to better the breeding of cats, to recognise new breeds, and to keep standards and rules regarding competitions. ACF is one of the nine members of the World Cat Congress, making it one of the major and reputable cat registries for pedigree registration of cat breeds worldwide.

== History ==
The association was created in 1972 under the name Australian National Cat Federation. The first ANCF cat show was organised in 1973 in Adelaide. The ANCF created its bimonthly publication National Cat in the same year, though its first issue would not appear until 1977. The association took its current name Australian Cat Federation in 1975.

In 1982, the association recognised the Somali cat, as well as the lilac and chocolate colours of the Persian cat. In 1984, the AFC adopted the standards set by the Fédération Internationale Féline (FIFe). The Balinese cat was recognised in 1985. In 1986, the ACF began to distance itself from the FIFe, and would not return until 1988. 1986 also saw an important modification in the Exotic Shorthair standard.

In 1991, the ACF recognised the Ragdoll. The 1993 cat show saw the introduction of the Australian method of judging, in which the judges move to the cats' boxes, rather than the other way around (known as Australian open-style judging). The Turkish Van and the Australian Mist (under the name spotted mist) were recognised in the same year. The Cymric was recognised in 1995. The Japanese Bobtail, the long-haired Scottish Fold, the Singapura, the Tonkinese and the Bengal were recognised in 1997, and the Sphynx, the Burmilla and the Ocicat in 1999.

== Activities ==
In 2001, the ACF hosted the annual meeting of the World Cat Congress (WCC), and registered the first Selkirk Rex cats. Since the creation of the association, many arguments have been made for the creation of a common breeding registry with the other Australian feline association, Co-ordinating Cat Council of Australia (CCCA).

== See also ==
- Cats in Australia
- List of cat breeds
- List of cat registries
