= List of cat registries =

List of cat pedigree registries worldwide

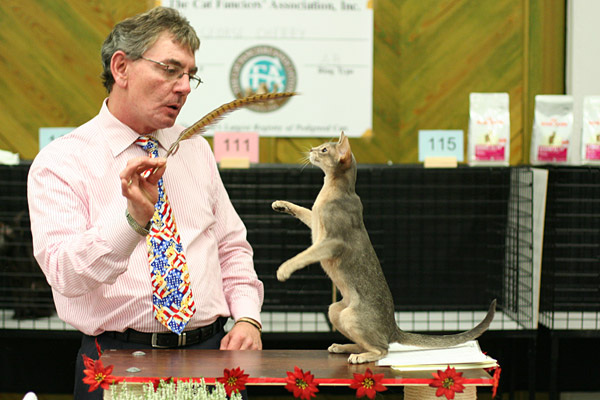
Blue Abyssinian female cat being judged at CFA cat show in Helsinki, Finland

This is a complete list of cat registries worldwide. A cat registry's purpose is to register the pedigrees of purebred cats which are recognised by the organisation.

== History ==
The first cat registry and governing body of the cat fancy was the National Cat Club, set up in 1887 in England. The Governing Council of the Cat Fancy (GCCF) is the oldest cat registry today, formed by a merger in 1910 of the National Cat Club and the Cat Club, the latter founded in 1898 by Lady Marcus Beresford and later known as the [British] Cat Fanciers’ Association. From 1910, the GCCF became the unified governing body and registry for the cat fancy in the UK, and is widely regarded as the original prototype for cat fancy registries worldwide. During the 20th and 21st century many more cat registries have been established around the globe.

=== Present day ===
The nine members of the World Cat Congress are regarded as the major and reputable cat registries for pedigree registration of cat breeds worldwide.

The International Cat Association (TICA) recognises 71 standardised breeds, the Cat Fanciers' Association (CFA) recognises 44, and the Fédération Internationale Féline (FIFe) recognises 48. The New Zealand Cat Fancy (NZCF) recognises and registers 55 cat breeds.

== Registries ==
Cat registry umbrella organisations
Abbr.	Name	Location	Breeds	Member Organisations	Breed clubs	Notes
CCCA (Note: Also abbreviated as CCC of A)	Co-ordinating Cat Council of Australia	Australia	46	7		WCC member
FIFe	Fédération Internationale Féline	Worldwide, Belgian-based	48	43		WCC member
NZCF	New Zealand Cat Fancy	New Zealand	55	21		WCC member
SACC (Note: Also abbreviated as TSACC for The Southern Africa Cat Council)	Southern Africa Cat Council	South Africa		9		WCC member
TICA	The International Cat Association	Worldwide, US-based	71	200		WCC member
WCF	World Cat Federation	Worldwide, German-based	89	66	370	WCC member

Cat registry member or non-umbrella organisations
Abbr.	Name	Location	Breeds	Breed clubs	Notes
ACA	American Cat Association	United States			
ACF	Australian Cat Federation	Australia			WCC member
ACFA	American Cat Fanciers Association	United States			shares the CAA standards (ACFA/CAA)
ASFE	Asociacion Felina Espanola	Spain			
CAA	Cat Aficionado Association	China			shares the ACFA standards (ACFA/CAA)
CCA-AFC	Canadian Cat Association/Association Féline Canadienne	Canada			
CCC	Chats Canada Cats	Canada			
CFA	Cat Fanciers' Association	predominately US	44	600	WCC member
CFF	Cat Fanciers' Federation	United States			
CFSA	Cat Federation of South Africa	South Africa			
EFF	Emirates Feline Federation	United Arabic Emirates			
FFF	Feline Fanciers Federation	Hong Kong			
FIAF	Federazione Italiana Associazioni Feline	Italy			
GCCF	Governing Council of the Cat Fancy	United Kingdom		150	WCC member
GCCFSA	Governing Council of the Cat Fancy of South Australia	Australia			
LOOF	Livre Officiel des Origines Félines	France			governmental registry mandatory for all French pedigree cats
NSW CFA	New South Wales Cat Fanciers Association	Australia		4	CCCA member
RASCC	Royal Agricultural Society of New South Wales Cat Club	Australia			CCCA founder
WNCA	Waratah State Cat Alliance	Australia			

Defunct cat registries
Abbr.	Name	Location
AACE	American Association of Cat Enthusiasts	United States
GCCFSA	Governing Council of the Cat Fancy of South Africa (Note: Merged into Southern Africa Cat Council (SACC))	South Africa

== See also ==
- List of cat breeds
- Cat
- Purebred breeders
- Cat fancy
- Cat show
- Breed registry
