= Abyssinian cat =

Breed of domestic cat

Abyssinian
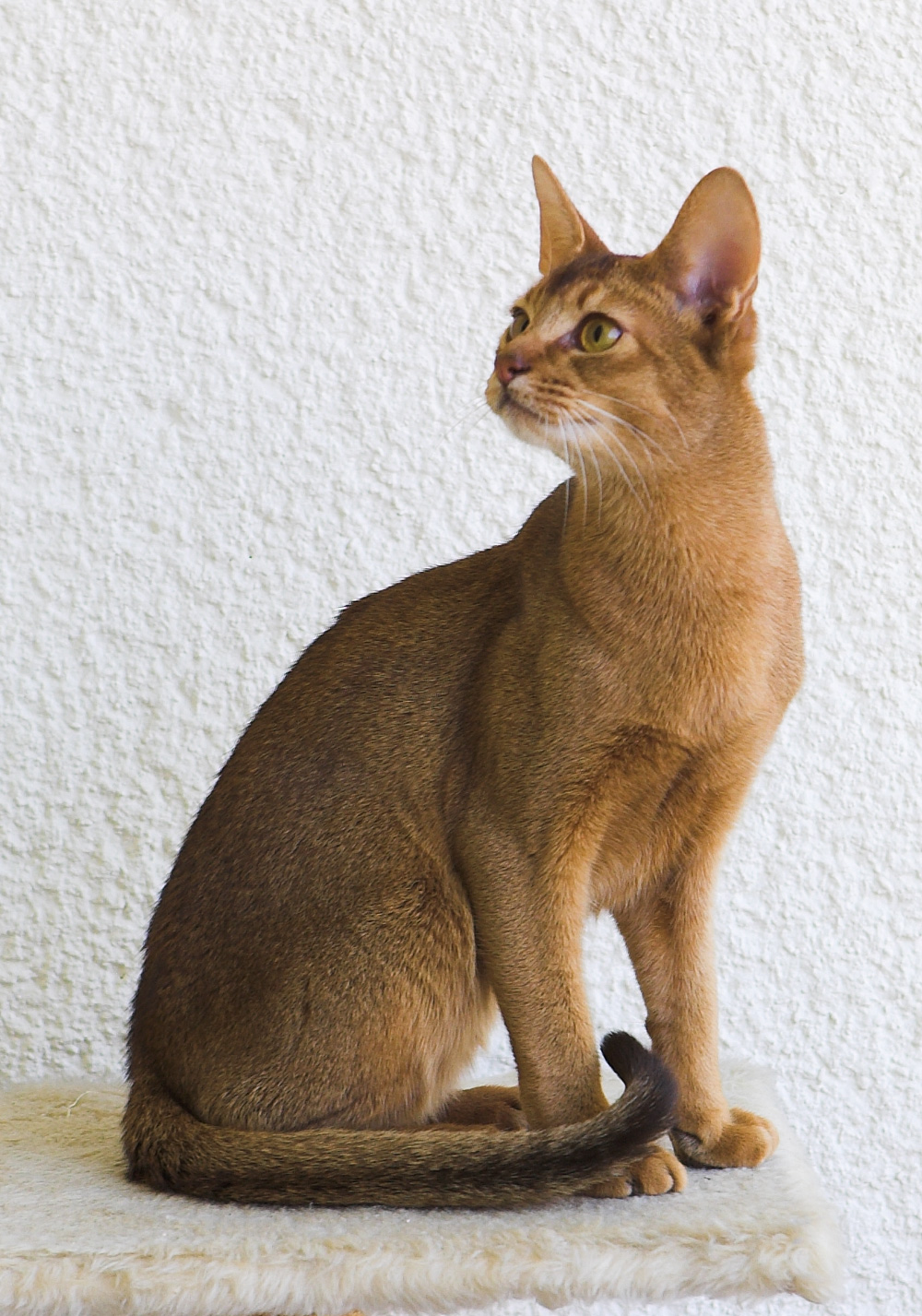
- A chocolate ticked tabby Abyssinian male
- Common nicknames: Aby
- Origin: United Kingdom
- Foundation bloodstock: Southeast Asian and European cats

Breed standards
- CFA: standard
- FIFe: standard
- TICA: standard
- ACF: standard
- CCA-AFC: standard
- GCCF: standard

The Abyssinian (/æbɪˈsɪniən/), colloquially known as the Aby, is a standardised breed of cat with a distinctive "ticked" tabby coat, in which individual agouti hairs are banded with different colours. The breed's distinctive appearance, seeming long, lean and finely coloured compared to other cats, has been analogised to that of human fashion models. Abys have a distinctive wildcat look with their ticked coat and large erect ears. They are a highly social breed and can be demanding for attention. They do well in multi-cat households due to their social nature. Not a lap cat, Abyssinians are in constant motion, either exploring or playing.

The first members of the breed to be exhibited in England were brought there from Abyssinia (now known as Ethiopia), hence the name. In contradiction, genetic studies place the breed's origins in Southeast Asia and Europe. However, it is possible that the breed was introduced to Abyssinia by travellers who had stopped in Calcutta, India.

== History ==
What is thought to be the earliest known designated Abyssinian cat is in an exhibit still residing in the Zoological Museum in Leiden, the Netherlands. It was purchased around 1834–1836 from a supplier of small wild cat exhibits as a taxidermy and was labelled by the museum founder as "Patrie, domestica India."

=== Zula ===
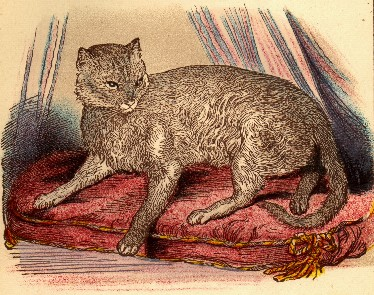
Zula, the so-called "first Abyssinian"

The first example of a domesticated Abyssinian, however, involves the story of a cat being brought to England by the British Lt. General Sir Robert Napier in 1868 who had returned from the Abyssinia War. The cat was given the name "Zula" and won first prize in the December 1871 Crystal Palace cat show.

Many modern Abyssinian breeders dispute Zula as having been the first domestic Abyssinian, arguing that the existing illustrations of Zula portray the cat as having ears too small for an Abyssinian and a coat too waved and long.

=== Breed development ===
The Abyssinian is one of the oldest established cat breeds, being recognised in 1929 by the Governing Council of the Cat Fancy (GCCF). The breed was developed in the United Kingdom with references dating back to at least the 1890s.

The breed was nearly wiped out in the United Kingdom following the Second World War and an outbreak of feline leukaemia virus, resulting in cats being imported from places such as the Netherlands, North America, Scandinavia, Australia, and New Zealand.

== Breed registration ==
=== Breed recognition ===
The Abyssinian was first recognised in 1929 by the GCCF. In 1979, this breed first received championship status with The International Cat Association (TICA).

=== Popularity ===
Abyssinians are a relatively rare breed worldwide. In 2022, the Abyssinians ranked at position 7 out of 46 cat breeds registered with the CFA. In the 2024 statistics of FIFe, one of the major global cat registries, the breed ranked at position 18 out of 54 breeds in popularity, comprising 0,9% of their total registered kittens that year, which translates to 848 cats.

== Characteristics ==
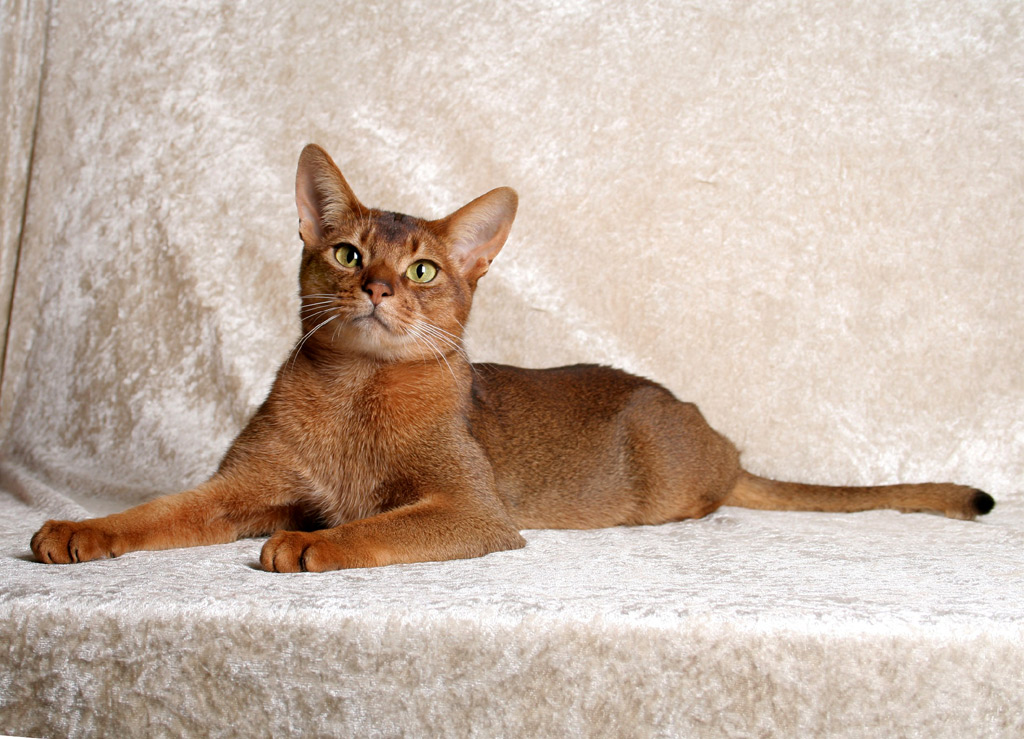
A champion adult male showing the classic black ticked tabby coat pattern

=== Appearance ===
The Abyssinian is a lithe, fine-boned, muscular, medium to large sized cat. The average weight is 4.5 kg (10 lb) ranging between 3.6–5.4 kg (8–12 lb) with height ranging between 20–25 cm (8–10 in). The head is moderately wedge-shaped, with a slight break at the muzzle, and nose and chin ideally forming a straight vertical line when viewed in profile. They have alert, relatively large pointed ears. The eyes are almond-shaped and are gold, green, hazel or copper depending on coat colour. The legs tend to be long in proportion to a graceful body, with small oval paws; the tail is likewise long and tapering.

==== Coat ====
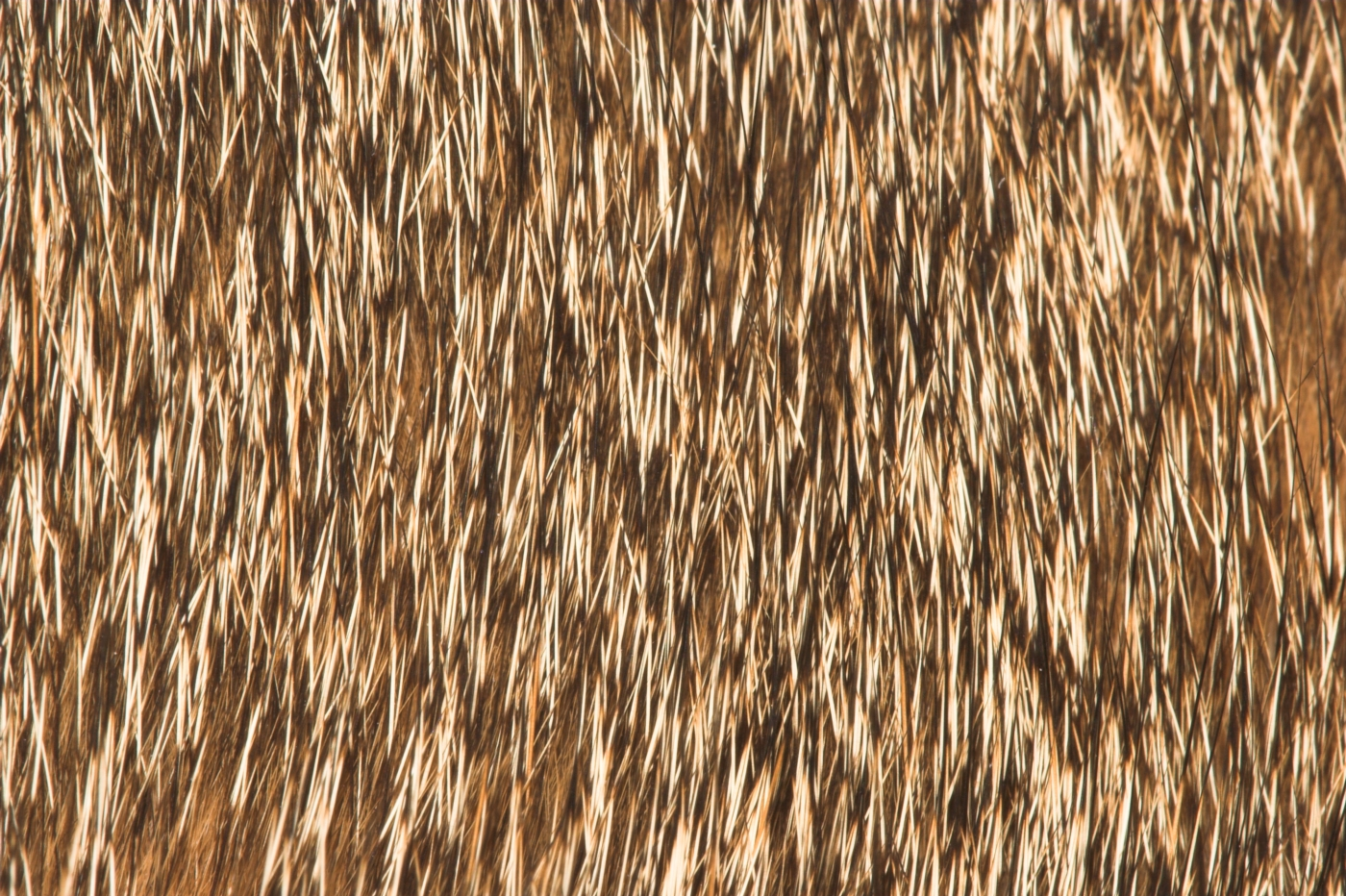
The fur exhibits a "ticked" effect

Abyssinian kittens are born with dark coats that gradually lighten as they mature, usually over several months. The coat is short, and is ideally fine, not soft, dense, close-lying and silky to the touch. The ticked or agouti effect that is the trademark of the breed—genetically a variant of the tabby pattern—should be uniform over the body, although the ridge of the spine and tail, back of the hind legs and the pads of the paws are always noticeably darker. Each hair has a light base with three or four bands of additional colour growing darker towards the tip. The base colour should be as clear as possible; any extensive intermingling with grey is considered a serious fault. A tendency to white on the chin is common but likewise must be minimal. The typical tabby M-shaped marking is often found on the forehead.

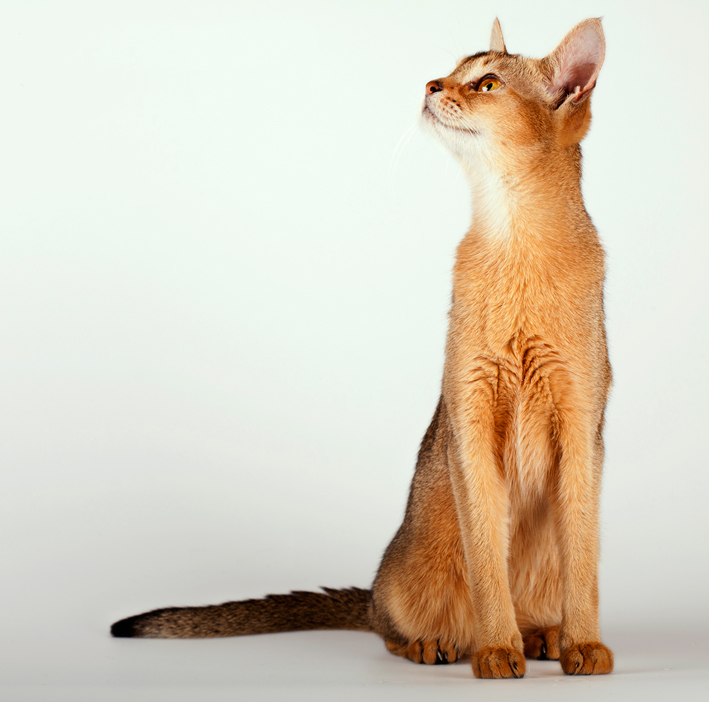
Black adult showing a high degree of rufism and a tendency to white on the chin

The breed's original colour standard is a warm deep reddish-brown base (high degree of rufism) with black ticking, known as "usual" in Europe, "tawny" in Oceania, and "ruddy". Cinnamon (also called "sorrel" or "red"), a lighter coppery base with cinnamon-brown ticking, is a unique mutation of this original pattern. Other variants have been introduced by outcrossing to the Burmese and other shorthaired breeds, notably blue (on a warm beige base) and fawn (on a softer creamy peach base). The less common chocolate and lilac are not recognised in some registries, but have been granted full champion status with others. Most registries also recognises the silver series, in which the base coat is a pure silvery-white with eumelanistic-coloured ticking. Various other colour combinations are allowed, including the "torbie", in which a tortoiseshell pattern in any of these eumelanistic colours is visible under the tabby banding.

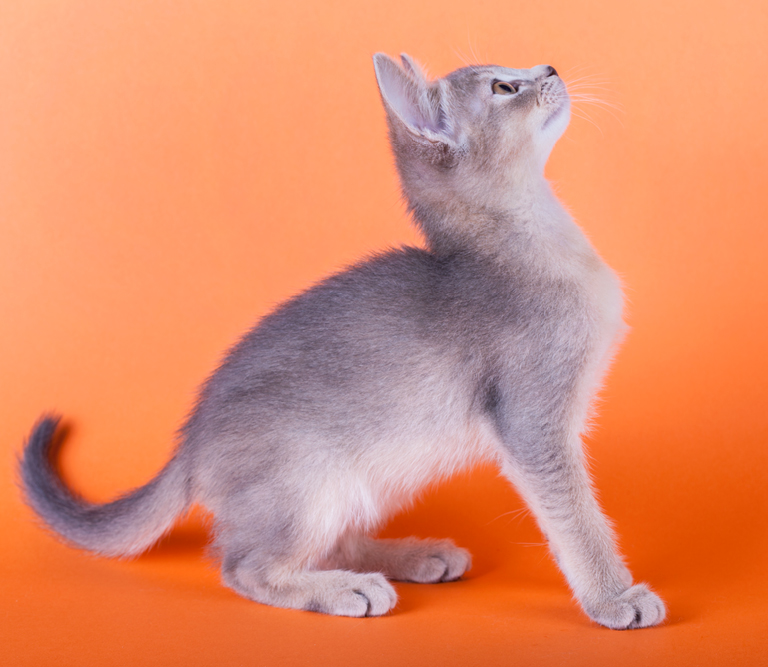
Blue ticked tabby kitten

In summary, Abyssinians are accepted in the following eumelanistic base colours, all in the ticked tabby coat pattern:

- black ("usual", "tawny", "ruddy")
- blue
- chocolate
- lilac
- cinnamon ("sorrel", "red")
- fawn

Additionally the following can be combined:

- silver series
- tortoiseshell

=== Behaviour ===
Veterinarian Joan O. Joshua has written that the "dog-like attachment to the owners" of Abyssinian and Burmese cats causes "greater dependence on human contacts". This stands in contrast to the mere "tolerant acceptance of human company" based around "comforts" that multiple other breeds display.

With their interest in playing with their owners combined with their curious intelligence, Abyssinians are sometimes called the "Clowns of the Cat Kingdom". They have soft chirrup-like vocalisations which do not sound like the expected "meow".

A study comparing Oriental Shorthair, Siamese and Abyssinian kittens to Norwegian Forest cat kittens found that the former group was more likely to recede and hide as well as display other 'shy' behaviour.

== Genetics ==
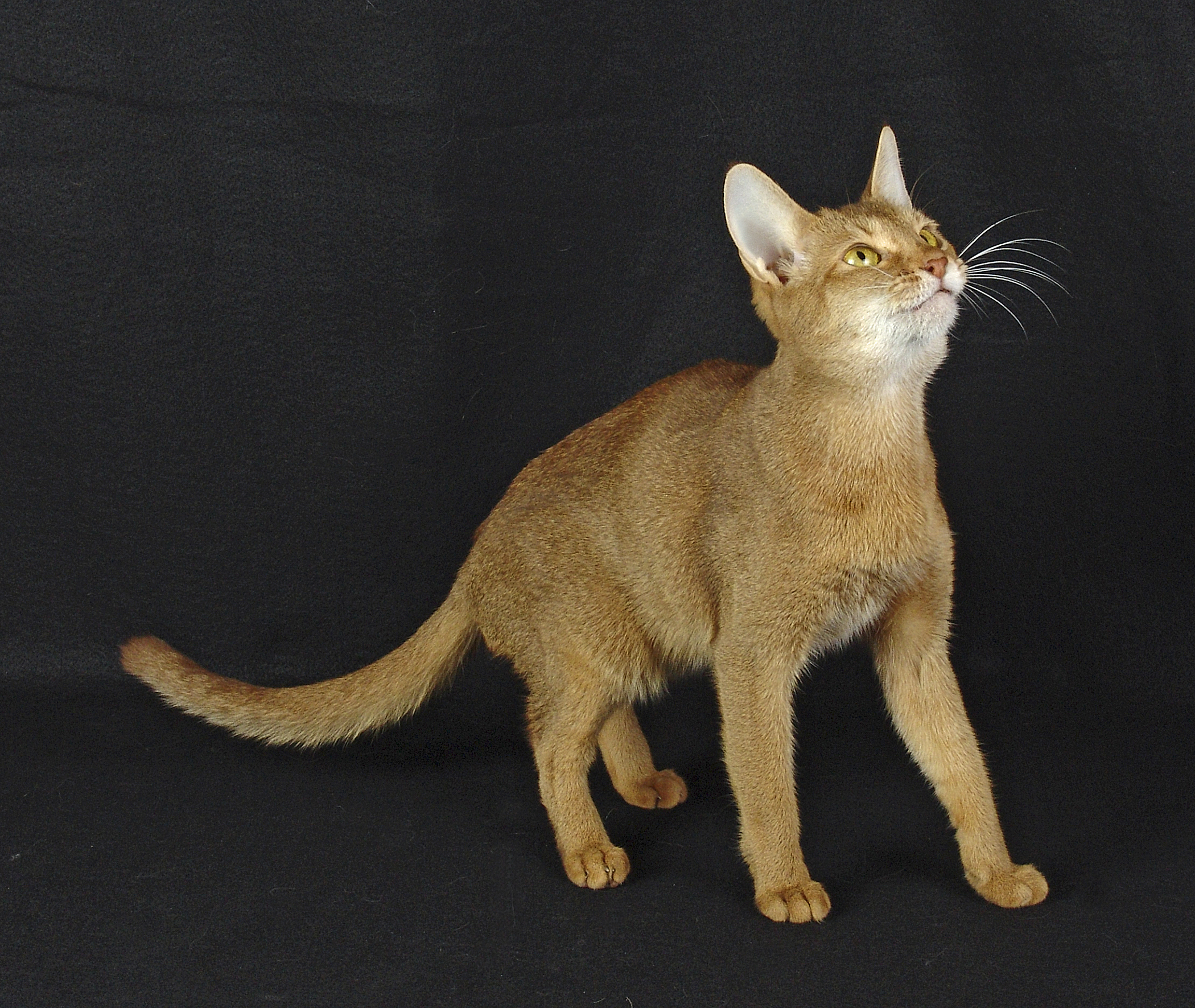
Cinnamon, the domestic cat who served as the first subject for the sequencing of the feline genome in 2007

The breed owes their distinctive ticked coat to an interaction of the tabby-gene (Ta) and ticked-gene (Ti). Their coats are the archetypal example of homozygous ticked tabby expression, due to numerous generations of breeding for this phenotype. In 2007, the first cat to have its entire genome published was an Abyssinian named Cinnamon.

=== Genetic breed origins ===
A genetic study into the origins of cat breeds conducted at UC Davis, US, found that the Abyssinian has a low level of genetic diversity, a heterozygosity value of 0.45 within a range of 0.34–0.69 for all breeds studied, and has genetic markers common to both Southeast Asian and Western breeds indicating that cats from both Asia and Europe were used to create the breed.

== Health ==
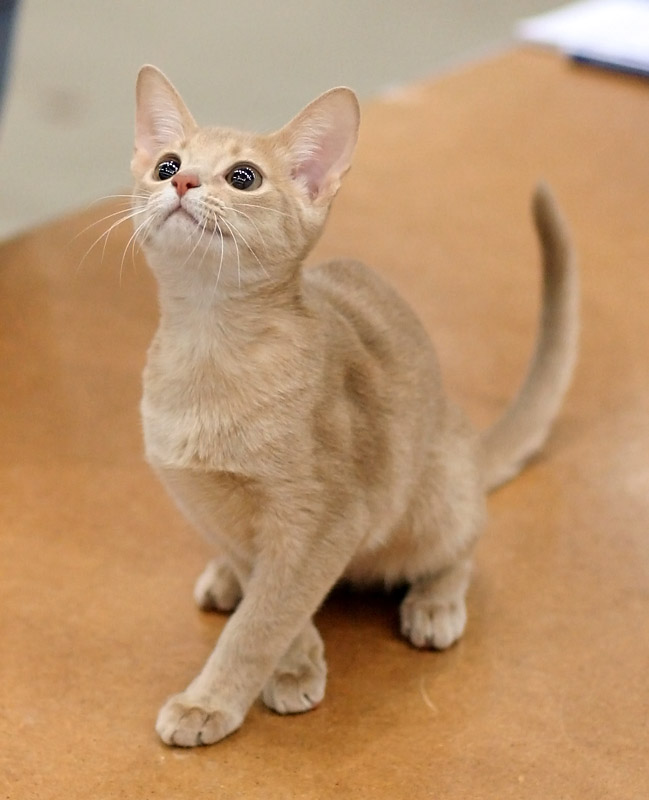
Fawn ticked tabby

Familial renal amyloidosis or AA amyloidosis, a kidney disorder due to a mutation in the AA amyloid protein gene, has been seen in Abyssinians. The Abyssinian has had severe problems with blindness caused by a hereditary retinal degeneration due to mutations in the rdAc gene. However, the prevalence has been reduced from 45% to less than 4% in 2008 in the country of Sweden. An Australian analysis found the Abyssinian to be over-represented in cases of feline infectious peritonitis when compared to the expected frequency based on census data (4.4% versus 1.5%). An US study had similar results with an odds ratio of 8.98.

In a review of over 5,000 cases of urate urolithiasis the Abyssinian was significantly under-represented, with only one of the recorded cases belonging to an Abyssinian.

The Abyssinian was found to be predisposed to feline atopic dermatitis in a retrospective study of cases of the disease.

The Abyssinian is predisposed to psychogenic alopecia.

An US study found the Abyssinian to be at increased risk of aortic thromboembolism with an odds ratio of 6.03.

A retrospective study in the US found the Abyssinian to be predisposed to acquired myasthaenia gravis with an odds ratio of 4.97.

Mycobacterium avium complex infection is a very rare disease: 10/12 cases were Abyssinians.

A study of cases of patellar luxation in the USA and in Europe found 38% (26/69) Abyssinians had the condition compared to 1/84 for other breeds.

The Abyssinian is the cat breed most commonly affected by progressive retinal atrophy. The condition is caused by two separate mutations in the breed. Early onset PRA is caused by an autosomal dominant mutation in the CRX gene. Late onset PRA is caused by an autosomal recessive mutation in the CEP290 gene.

The Abyssinian is one of the more commonly affected breeds for pyruvate kinase deficiency. An autosomal recessive mutation of the PKLR gene is responsible for the condition in the breed.

== See also ==
- List of cat breeds
