= World Cat Congress =

International confederation of cat lover organisations

- Abbreviation: WCC
- Formation: 1994
- Founders: CFA, GCCF, FIFe, WCF
- Region served: Worldwide
- Members: 9
- President: Jan van Rooyen
- Vice-President: Annette Sjödin
- Key people: Robbie Walker
- Website: worldcatcongress.org

The World Cat Congress (WCC) is a global umbrella confederation comprising the world's major international federations and national associations in the cat fancy.

== History ==
In 1994 the Italian cat club Associazione Nazionale Felina Italiana organised a cat club seminar during which a meeting was held between the visiting heads of world cat organisations. Out of this grew the idea of the World Cat Congress (WCC).

== Purpose ==
The purpose of the WCC is to promote better co-operation among the world's various cat associations to improve the health and welfare of all cats. It also aims to share resources to promote the interests and to educate the participants of the ‘Cat Fancy’ throughout the world.

Regular meetings took place between members and in 1999 a charter was drawn up and in 2001 a constitution was agreed.

The WCC emphasises the importance of international co-operation between cat organisations and to discuss topics such as veterinary matters, microchipping, breed presentations, cat legislation, and feline welfare affecting all cats. An annual meeting is held, treating proposals of the 9 bodies affiliated.

WCC's aims include these:

- Creating cat shows and coordination of show dates
- Promoting cat health
- Consulting on legislation regarding cats
- Producing and distributing educational material about cats
- Recognition and registration of pedigrees and breeders

== WCC members ==
The WCC comprises the world's major cat fancies:

- Australian Cat Federation (ACF)*
- Cat Fanciers' Association (CFA)*
- Co-ordinating Cat Council of Australia (CCC of A)
- Fédération Internationale Féline (FIFe)*
- Governing Council of the Cat Fancy, United Kingdom (GCCF)
- New Zealand Cat Fancy (NZCF)
- Southern Africa Cat Council (SACC)
- The International Cat Association (TICA)*
- World Cat Federation - (WCF)*

*Founding members.
