= Cat registry =

Organisation that registers domestic, usually purebred, cats

A cat registry or cat breed registry, also known as a cat fancier organisation, cattery federation, or cat breeders' association, is an organisation that registers domestic cats (usually purebred) of many breeds, for exhibition and for breeding lineage tracking purposes. A cat registry stores the pedigrees (genealogies) of cats, cattery names, and other details of cats; studbooks (lists of authorised studs of recognised breeds), breed descriptions, and the formal breed standards; lists of judges qualified to judge at shows run by or affiliated with that registry, and sometimes other information. A cat registry is not the same as a breed club or breed society (these are specific-breed organisations that may be affiliated with one or more registries with whom they have lodged breed standards in order to be able to exhibit under the auspices of that registry).

Cat registries each have their own rules and usually also organise or license (sanction) cat shows. The show procedures vary widely, and awards won in one registry are not normally recognised by another. Some registries only serve breeders, while others are oriented toward pet owners and provide individual as well as cattery memberships, while yet others are federations only deal with breed clubs or even other registries as intermediaries between the organisation and breeders.

== History ==
The first cat registry was the National Cat Club, set up in 1887 in England. Until the formation of the Governing Council of the Cat Fancy in 1910, the National Cat Club was also the governing body of the cat fancy. A rival registry called the Cat Club was set up in 1898 by Lady Marcus Beresford, but foundered in 1903 and was replaced by the [British] Cat Fanciers' Association. Cats could only be registered with one or the other registry. These two fancies merged in 1910 and became the GCCF.

In the United States, the 1899 Chicago cat show resulted in the formation of the Chicago Cat Club, followed by the better-organised Beresford Cat Club (named after noted British breeder Lady Marcus Beresford). In 1906, the Beresford Cat Club renamed itself the American Cat Association (ACA) and rapidly became the dominant North American registry for a short time. In 1908, the [US, and extant] Cat Fanciers' Association (CFA) split off, and both organisations continue to the present, with competition from The International Cat Association (TICA), also US-based, as well as more regional associations. ACA today accepts Canadian and Mexican as well as US registrations but remains primarily active in the northeastern United States. Both TICA and CFA are international, though the bulk of their pedigrees are issued to US breeders.

In the intervening years, many cat registries have been formed worldwide. These range from international organisations or federations to national registries in one particular country. In many countries, independent registries have also been formed which may or may not be recognised by the main registries.

The internationally broadest organisation is the Fédération Internationale Féline (FIFe, founded 1949 in Paris, and presently based in Belgium), which is a worldwide federation of member cat registries, with a large European and South American presence. The World Cat Federation (WCF, founded 1988 in Rio de Janeiro, presently based in Germany), has a strong presence in Latin America, throughout Western Europe, and in countries of the former USSR. It is organised on a similar basis to FIFe but has a much more permissive approach to new breed acceptance. Like CFA, WCF provides a cattery registration service (to "reserve" cattery names and prevent others from using conflicting ones).

While some cat registries forbid the practice, it is now common to allow a cat to be registered by more than one registry. The World Cat Congress (WCC) is an international coordinating organisation of the largest and most reputable cat registries. WCC operates an "open-door" policy by which cats registered with one WCC registry can be shown under the rules of another WCC registry. Going further, WCC-member WCF accepts half again as many breeds as it publishes standards for, because it accepting the standards of TICA, FIFe, and several other WCC-affiliated federations, though it has also produced some nomenclatural conflicts with some of them.

Some independent cat registries specialise in particular types of cats that are ineligible for registration with a major registry due to breed restrictions or certain genetic traits. For example, The Dwarf Cat Association recognises breeds derived from the short-legged Munchkin (a cat body type genetic mutation), which are banned by FIFe and some other registries. The Rare and Exotic Feline Registry specialises in cats derived from (or alleged to derive from) hybridisation with wildcat species.

== Breed registration ==
=== Recognition levels ===
Most registries offer several levels of recognition (often called registers). The actual designations differ between registries, but typically these are:

Full
a breed that competes for championship titles at shows organised by, or affiliated to, that registry
Provisional/Preliminary
the level of recognition of cat breeds until they demonstrate that they breed true to their registered standards; there may be several levels of provisional/preliminary recognition e.g. new or advanced as numbers and popularity increase
Experimental
a provisional register for breeds in development; this may be separate from the provisional/preliminary register in some cat fancies
Exhibition only
a new trait, new import or minority variety that does not compete, but is exhibited in order to attract opinion and/or potential breeders
Registration only
status means cats of that breed can be registered, but do not have permission to be exhibited.

Not all breeds achieve full (championship) status.

=== Genetic standards ===
In breeds known to carry recessive genes (e.g. long-haired cats born from short-haired parents, colourpoint cats born from non-colourpoint parents), cats that do not meet their breed standard might be registered as variants or they might be registered under a different breed name. These may sometimes be used to maintain a good gene pool, but not exhibited in championship classes for the parents' breed.

A genetic register is used by some registries for breeds where a genetic test is required before cats can be bred. Cats that have not been cleared through testing remain on the genetic register unless negative test results are provided. There may also be active and inactive registers that denote whether a cat legitimately may be used in breeding and its offspring registered.

A cat registry is at liberty to refuse to accept breeds if it feels the breed is not genetically sound; does not breed true to the standard put forward by the developer(s) of the breed (with allowances made for known variants); is not represented in sufficient numbers or is not sufficiently distinct from breeds already recognised by the registry. It may also expel breeders who do not conform to accepted standards of behaviour and ethics, with the result that their cats may be disqualified from its shows.

=== Breed development ===
The rules as to what constitutes a new breed vary from registry to registry. The International Cat Association (TICA) is a relatively progressive registry that will recognise breeds derived from crossing existing breeds; mutations of an existing breed; naturally occurring breeds indigenous to a geographical location; a breed already recognised by a different registry; and experimental breeds that do not yet have a TICA-approved breed name. FIFe will register some new breeds imported from other registries but have set procedures for these breeds to gain full recognition. The GCCF is a more conservative registry and recognises new colour variations of an existing breed, but do not usually recognise other mutations of an existing breed e.g. spontaneous rexed fur, and is slow to accept new breeds. CFA takes a similar resistant approach, and has a position statement discouraging most attempts at new breed formation or even new coat colour patterns.

What constitutes a breed at all also varies widely between registries. Some "permissive" organisations recognise as separate breeds what most "conservative" registries would consider several coat variants of the same breed. For example, the WCF treats all long-haired and short-haired variants as distinct breeds, and both WCF and CFA recognise a Colourpoint Shorthair breed that others consider a Siamese cat with non-standard colouration. Similarly, the Cymric is recognised as a breed in some registries, considered under that name as a sub-breed of the Manx in some, called simply the Manx Longhair or Longhair Manx in others, and not recognised at all by a few. Registries may also use different names for the same breed, and the WCF has even been known to assign breed names that conflict with those other registries (i.e. are applied to completely different breeds). Various registries includes breeds not recognised (yet) by any others, either due to differences in relative progressiveness toward breed introduction and establishment, or due to geographical proximity to breeds unknown in other parts of the world.

== Breed code systems ==
Registries allocate a breed number, acronym or code to the breeds they register. Nowadays, all cat registries use the FIFe EMS (Easy Memory System) code system, or their own adaptation of it. It consists of a breed and variety code – a breed abbreviation followed by variety (pattern, colour, tail length etc) letters and digits which are consistent across all breeds and languages.

=== Breed code ===
Most use a two or 3 letter acronym for the breed, e.g. MK (Munchkin), JBT (Japanese Bobtail). Previously the British GCCF allocated numbers to breeds for historical reasons, and the Black Persian Longhair was registered under a different breed number, and effectively as a different breed, to the Blue Persian Longhair.

Where a breed is already recognised by another registry, it is becoming increasingly common to adopt an existing acronym (with the possible addition or subtraction of a letter) in order to avoid clashes and confusion. Where 2 breeds with different characteristics have the same name, it is usual to prefix the name with the country/area of origin e.g. in the US the "Burmese" and "European Burmese" are different breeds with different conformation. In the GCCF, "Burmese" refers to the European form as the "American Burmese" is not recognised.

A single breed may have 2 different breed names in different countries. In Britain, a cat of Persian type with the colourpoint pattern is called a Colourpoint Persian. In the US it is called a Himalayan. The US-bred Serengeti was founded in 1992 from Oriental Shorthair × Bengal crosses to resemble the wild cats of the Serengeti Plains but without the introduction of wild cat blood. In Britain, a Bengal × Siamese cross was originally called the Savannah, but was later renamed Serengeti because of an existing US breed called the Savannah. The US-bred Savannah is a hybrid breed (serval × domestic cat).

=== Variety code ===
The breed code may be followed by numbers or lower case acronyms that indicate colour and pattern, these being subdivisions of the breed. These code systems may be found on individual registry websites (or in their printed publications where they do not yet have a website).

Where colours have been added to a breed through outcrossing to another breed, not all registries accept the new colours under the original breed name e.g. Chocolate Persians and Lilac Persians may be recognised under the name "Kashmir" as the two colours were introduced through crossing to Siamese cats during the development of the Colourpoint Persian (UK) and Himalayan (US).

== List of registries and related organisations ==
=== World co-ordinating body ===
- World Cat Congress (WCC) – does not issue breed standards

=== International ===
- Cat Fanciers' Association (CFA) – over 67,000 breeders/catteries registered (not all are active members); over 2 mil. registered cats; about 400 shows per year; 600 clubs; 42 recognised breeds (as of 2016); describes itself as "the largest registry of pedigreed cats"
- Fédération Internationale Féline (FIFe) – over 100,000 individual members, 3,000 cattery members, and 110,000 pedigrees (involving entire litters; over 200,000 cats are shown annually at FIFe events); 43 organisations (plus 1 provisional) in 41 countries; over 700 shows per year; 48 recognised breeds (as of 2016); describes itself as "the United Nations of cat federations" and "a leading international cat fancier society"
- The International Cat Association (TICA) – over 3,000 individual members; about 200 shows per year; over 200 clubs; 75 recognised breeds (as of 2016), describes itself as "the world's largest genetic registry of pedigreed cats, and the world's largest registry of household pets"
- World Cat Federation (WCF) – over 10,000 breeders/catteries registered (not all are active members); 66 national organisations (plus 64 provisional); 370 clubs (over 500 counting sub-clubs) total pedigrees unknown (handled by clubs, not centralised); average of over 500 shows per year; 89 recognised breeds (as of 2016); describes itself as "an international association of cat clubs [...] working on the development of animal protection laws"

=== National ===
- American Cat Fanciers Association (ACFA)
- Australian Cat Federation (ACF)
- Canadian Cat Association/Association Féline Canadienne (CCA-AFC)
- Cat Aficionado Association (CAA) – China (shares the ACFA standards)
- Governing Council of the Cat Fancy (GCCF) – UK
- New Zealand Cat Fancy (NZCF)
- Southern Africa Cat Council (SACC or TSACC)

== See also ==
- Breed registry
- List of cat registries

== Notes and references ==
- Simpson, Frances. 1903. The Book of the Cat.
- Winslow, Helen M. 1900. Concerning Cats.
