= Purebred =

Distinct, selectively bred animal species

Purebreds are cultivars of an animal species achieved through the process of selective breeding. When the lineage of a purebred animal is recorded, that animal is said to be pedigreed. Purebreds breed true-to-type, which means the progeny of like-to-like purebred parents will carry the same phenotype, or observable characteristics of the parents. A group of like purebreds is called a pure-breeding line or strain.

== True breeding ==
In the world of selective animal breeding, to "breed true" means that specimens of an animal breed will breed true-to-type when mated like-to-like. That is, that the progeny of any two individuals of the same breed will show fairly consistent, replicable and predictable characteristics, or traits with sufficiently high heritability. A puppy from two purebred dogs of the same breed, for example, will exhibit the traits of its parents, and not the traits of all breeds in the subject breed's ancestry.

Breeding from too small a gene pool, especially direct inbreeding, can lead to the passing on of undesirable characteristics or even a collapse of a breed population due to inbreeding depression. Therefore, there is a question, and often heated controversy, as to when or if a breed may need to allow "outside" stock in for the purpose of improving the overall health and vigor of the breed.

Because pure-breeding creates a limited gene pool, purebred animal breeds are also susceptible to a wide range of congenital health problems. This problem is especially prevalent in competitive dog breeding and dog show circles due to the singular emphasis on aesthetics rather than health or function. Such problems also occur within certain segments of the horse industry for similar reasons. The problem is further compounded when breeders practice inbreeding. The opposite effect to that of the restricted gene pool caused by pure-breeding is known as hybrid vigor, which generally results in healthier animals.

== Pedigrees ==
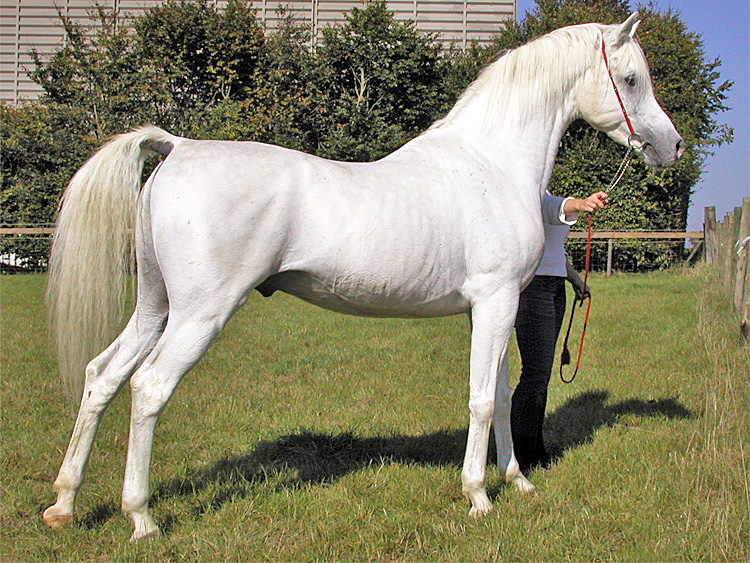
A purebred Arabian horse.

A pedigreed animal is one that has its ancestry recorded. Often this is tracked by a major registry. The number of generations required varies from breed to breed, but all pedigreed animals have papers from the registering body that attest to their ancestry.

The word "pedigree" appeared in the English language in 1410 as pee de Grewe, pedegrewe or pedegru, each of those words being borrowed to the Middle French pié de grue, meaning 'crane foot'. This comes from a visual analogy between the trace of the bird's foot and the three lines used in the English official registers to show the ramifications of a genealogical tree.

Sometimes the word purebred is used synonymously with pedigreed, but purebred refers to the animal having a known ancestry, and pedigree refers to the written record of breeding. Not all purebred animals have their lineage in written form. For example, until the 20th century, the Bedouin people of the Arabian Peninsula only recorded the ancestry of their Arabian horses via an oral tradition, supported by the swearing of religiously based oaths as to the asil or "pure" breeding of the animal. Conversely, some animals may have a recorded pedigree or even a registry, but not be considered "purebred". Today the modern Anglo-Arabian horse, a cross of Thoroughbred and Arabian bloodlines, is considered such a case.

== By type ==
=== Dogs ===
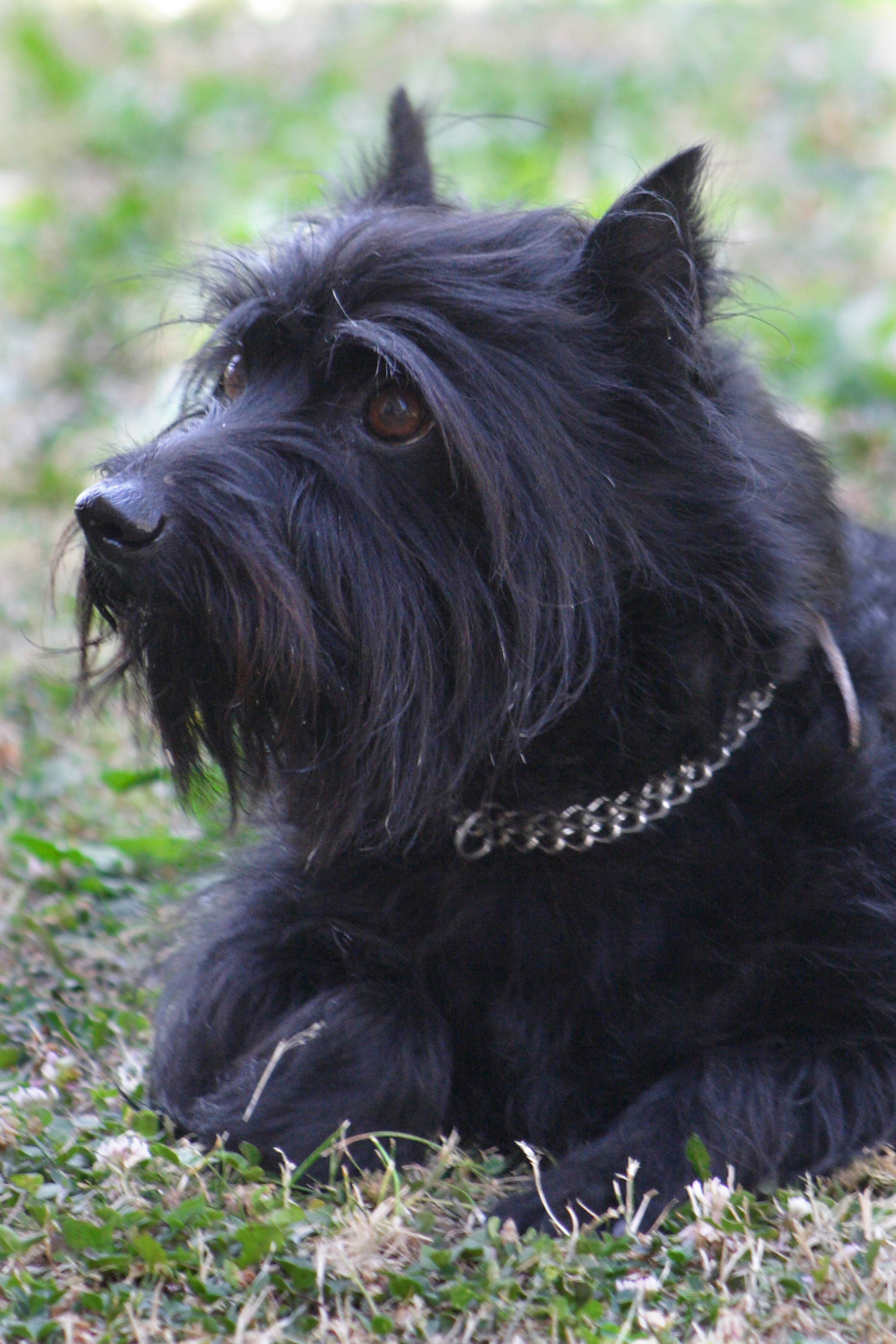
Pure-breed Zwergschnauzer

In dogs, the term breed is used two ways: loosely, to refer to dog types or landraces of dog (also called natural breeds or ancient breeds); or more precisely, to refer to modern breeds of dog, which are documented so as to be known to be descended from specific ancestors, that closely resemble others of their breed in appearance, movement, way of working and other characters; and that reproduce with offspring closely resembling each other and their parents. Purebred dogs are breeds in the second sense.

New breeds of dog are constantly being created, and there are many websites for new breed associations and breed clubs offering legitimate registrations for new or rare breeds. When dogs of a new breed are "visibly similar in most characteristics" and have reliable documented descent from a "known and designated foundation stock", then they can then be considered members of a breed, and, if an individual dog is documented and registered, it can be called purebred.

=== Cats ===
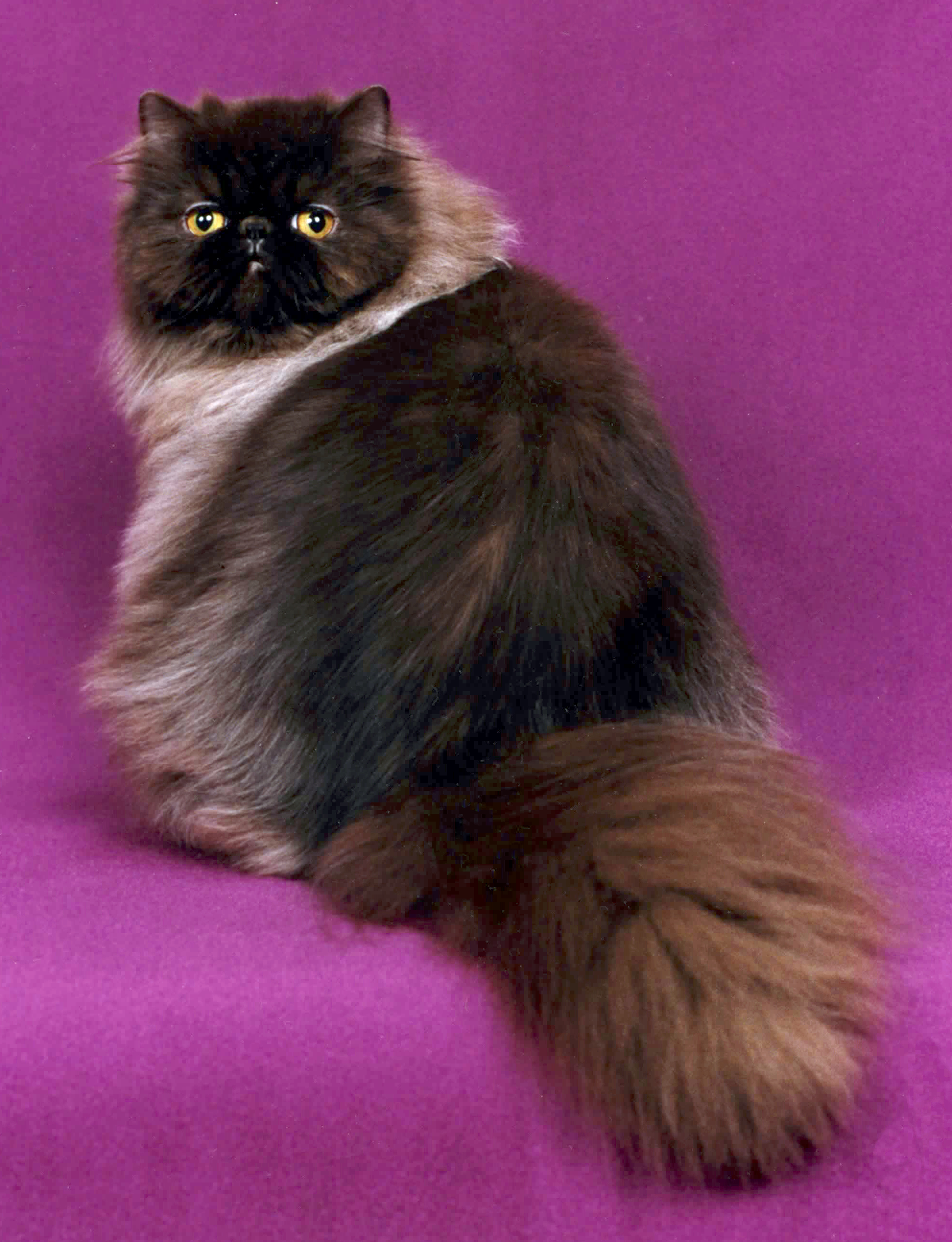
Purebred chocolate Persian show cat with "Grand Champion" title.

A cat whose ancestry is formally registered is called a pedigreed or purebred cat. Technically, a purebred cat is one whose ancestry contains only individuals of the same breed. A pedigreed cat is one whose ancestry is recorded with a cat registry, but may have ancestors of different breeds. Landraces are not cat breeds, but a selective group of representative cats can be used as foundation stock to create a new cat breed (examples of breeds created in this way are the Maine Coon, European Shorthair and Siberian).

Because of common crossbreeding in populated areas, most cats are simply identified as belonging to the unregistered non-pedigree cats of mixed or unknown ancestry, referred to as domestic long-haired and domestic short-haired cat, depending on their fur length. Other commonly used terms are random-bred cat, domestic cat, house(hold) cat or moggie/moggy (UK English). Out of the hundreds of millions of cats worldwide, almost none have any purebred ancestors, nor belong to a specific breed, because purebred cats are a human invention of the last 150 years and selectively bred from foundation stock by breeders in closed-off lineages.

According to the government of the United States, fewer than 2% of cats in that country are purebred and raised by breeders. Not all breeders sell registered pedigree cats. In France, this number is higher and approximately 4% of cats are pedigreed. (Note: All purebred cats born in France after 1999 should be registered with LOOF. LOOF registry data from 2003-2022 is publicly available and shows that 646774 cats were registered in that time period. In 2022, France had a cat population of 14.9 million according to Statista. Discarding the import and export of French purebred cats and cats born before 2003 (due to lack of data), this means 646774 out of 14.9 million or 4.3% of the French cats is registered/pedigreed. As most cat registries do not have their data public, are an international registry, or not forced by national laws, this is one of the few sources that gives a valid indication of cat registry numbers. Most self-reported data on cat breeds is influenced by the fact that rescues/owners label for example all solid blue cats as Russian Blue cats.) Worldwide the number of pedigreed cats is somewhat lower, and is estimated at 1–2%. (Note: Based on the less than 2% of cats in the USA, the approximately 4% of the registered pedigreed cats in France, and the popularity of pedigreed cats in France compared to all other countries worldwide. The cat fancy is well established in France since the end of the 19th-century. The popularity of pedigree cats in France is also seen in the number of different breeds registered with LOOF, and the numbers of France born and living pedigree cats compared to other countries in the PawPeds-database.)

By definition all cats belonging to a specific breed are pedigreed cats with a known and formally registered ancestry with one of the cat registries, also known as the cat's “paperwork” or pedigree. The list of cat breeds is quite large: most cat registries actually recognize between 30 and 75 breeds of cats, and several more are in development, with one or more new breeds being recognized each year on average, having distinct features (phenotype) and lineage. Nowadays, there exist over 100 cat breeds and varieties recognized by at least one of the official cat registries. The purpose of the registry of cat breeds is to develop and maintain a healthy breed by controlling inbreeding and the spread of hereditary diseases, and regulating the well-being of the cats. Owners and breeders compete in cat shows to see whose animal bears the closest resemblance (best conformance) to an idealized definition, based on breed type and the breed standard for each breed.

Modern breeders created cat breeds, which are actually feline hybrids between a wild cat species and the domestic cat species (Felis catus ). A famous example of such a hybrid cat breed is the Savannah cat (Felis catus × Leptailurus serval ), which is produced by crossing wild servals with domestic cats.

Some natural, ancient breeds of cat that have a distinct phenotype were formerly considered or speculated to be subspecies of wild cats or domestic cats (Felis catus), or hybrids between them. Later genetic research shows that only one wild cat species was domesticated; the north African and southwest Asian wild cat (Felis silvestris lybica). All domestic (non-hybrid) cats and cat breeds fall under the domestic cat (Felis catus), and are no longer considered separate (sub)species. The domestication of the Felis silvestris lybica started around 9.000 years ago in the Near East and Egypt region, while the selective breeding of purebred/pedigreed cat breeds only started 150 years ago.

=== Horses ===
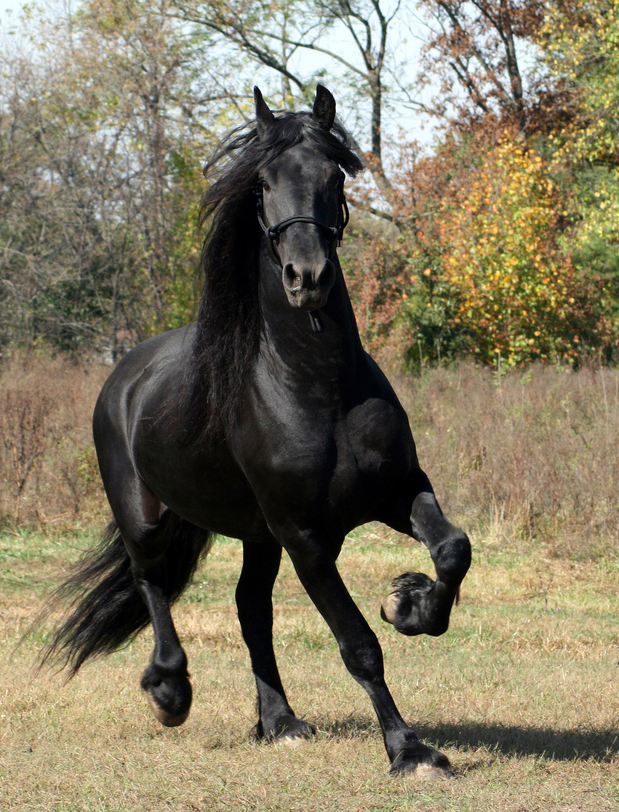
A Frisian horse (stallion), a breed which earliest known reference is from AD 50 (reign of Roman Emperor Nero) and is pedigree registered since 1879

Written and oral histories of various animals or pedigrees of certain types of horse have been kept throughout history, though breed registry stud books trace back to about the 13th century, at least in Europe, when pedigrees were tracked in writing, and the practice of declaring a type of horse to be a breed or a purebred became more widespread.

Certain horse breeds, such as the Andalusian horse and the Arabian horse, are claimed by aficionados of the respective breeds to be ancient, near-pure descendants from an ancient wild prototype, though mapping of the horse genome as well as the mtDNA and y-DNA of various breeds has largely disproved such claims.

=== Livestock ===
Most domesticated farm animals among others can also have true-breeding breeds and breed registries, particularly cattle, water buffaloes, sheep, goats, donkeys, guinea pigs, chickens, fancy pigeons, domestic ducks, rabbits, and pigs. While animals bred strictly for market sale are not always purebreds, or if purebred may not be registered, most livestock producers value the presence of purebred genetic stock for the consistency of traits such animals provide. It is common for a farm's male breeding stock in particular to be of purebred, pedigreed lines.

In cattle, some breeders associations make a difference between "purebred" and "full blood". Full blood cattle are fully pedigreed animals, where every ancestor is registered in the herdbook and shows the typical characteristics of the breed. Purebred are those animals that have been bred-up to purebred status as a result of using full blood animals to cross with an animal of another breed.

Artificial breeding via artificial insemination or embryo transfer is often used in sheep and cattle breeding to quickly expand, or improve purebred herds. Embryo transfer techniques allow top quality female livestock to have a greater influence on the genetic advancement of a herd or flock in much the same way that artificial insemination has allowed greater use of superior sires.
