= Southern Africa Cat Council =

Cat registry organisation in South Africa

- Abbreviation: SACC
- Formation: 14 June 1946; 79 years ago
- Founded at: Natal
- Headquarters: South Africa
- Services: Cat pedigree registry
- President: Jan van Rooyen
- Affiliations: World Cat Congress
- Website: www.tsacc.org.za
- Formerly called: South African Cat Union, Associated Cat Clubs

The Southern Africa Cat Council (SACC) is a cat registry and cat fancy organisation based in South Africa, affiliating 9 clubs, 14 breed groups and 4 judges panels. The SACC is one of the nine members of the World Cat Congress, making it one of the major and reputable cat registries for pedigree registration of cat breeds worldwide.

== History ==
On 14 June 1946, the precursor of the SACC (South African Cat Union) was founded in Natal, which in 1959 merged into the Associated Cat Clubs of South Africa, the first organisation serving the nationwide South African cat fancy. In 1996, the members overhauled the organisation's structure and constitution, and adopted the name Southern African Cat Council.

SACC joined the World Cat Congress in 2006.
