= New Zealand Cat Fancy =

New Zealand cat registry

- Abbreviation: NZCF
- Location: Te Aroha
- Region served: New Zealand
- Services: Cat pedigree registry
- Chairperson: Sheree Russell
- Affiliations: World Cat Congress
- Website: nzcf.com

The New Zealand Cat Fancy (NZCF) is a cat registry in New Zealand with 21 affiliated clubs. NZCF is one of the nine members of the World Cat Congress, making it one of the major and reputable cat registries for pedigree registration of cat breeds worldwide.

The NZCF lists 55 breeds of purebred cat on its website. It promotes cat shows and holds an annual national cat show. It was the first cat registry to admit polydactyl Maine Coons to competition, in December 2008. The NZCF also publishes a quarterly magazine called Flash Cats.

== See also ==
- List of cat registries
