= World Cat Federation =

International association of cat clubs based in Germany

- Abbreviation: WCF
- Formation: 1988; 38 years ago
- Founded at: Rio de Janeiro, Brazil
- Headquarters: Essen, Germany
- Region served: Worldwide
- Services: Cat pedigree registry
- Official language: English, French, German
- President: Anneliese Hackmann
- Secretary General: Tatjana Cernova
- Affiliations: World Cat Congress
- Website: wcf.de/en/

The World Cat Federation (WCF) is an international cat registry association of cat clubs. It was founded in 1988 in the city of Rio de Janeiro, and operates worldwide with a strong presence in Asia, Latin America, and Eastern and Western Europe. It is currently based in Germany with Anneliese Hackmann from Essen as president. There are 370 member organisations worldwide associated to the WCF. The WCF is one of the nine members of the World Cat Congress, making it one of the major and reputable cat registries for pedigree registration of cat breeds worldwide.

== Purpose ==
The WCF allows the breeders and breeder clubs of the WCF affiliated member clubs to register the pedigrees and cattery names internationally. The WCF creates breed standards for the 68 pedigreed breeds of cats recognised by the federation. They also train judges for exhibitions and organise the show examinations. Generally, the WCF is designed to promote international contact of the affiliated member clubs.

The WCF comprises over 10,000 breeders/catteries registered (not all are active members); 66 national member organisations (plus 64 provisional); 370 breeder clubs (over 500 counting sub-clubs); average of over 500 shows per year; 111 breeds listed as recognised or accepted (as of 2020). (Note: Total registered pedigrees unknown (handled by clubs, not centralised))

WCF describes itself as "an international association of cat clubs [...] successfully working on the development of animal protection laws in European Parliament in Strasbourg."

== Events ==
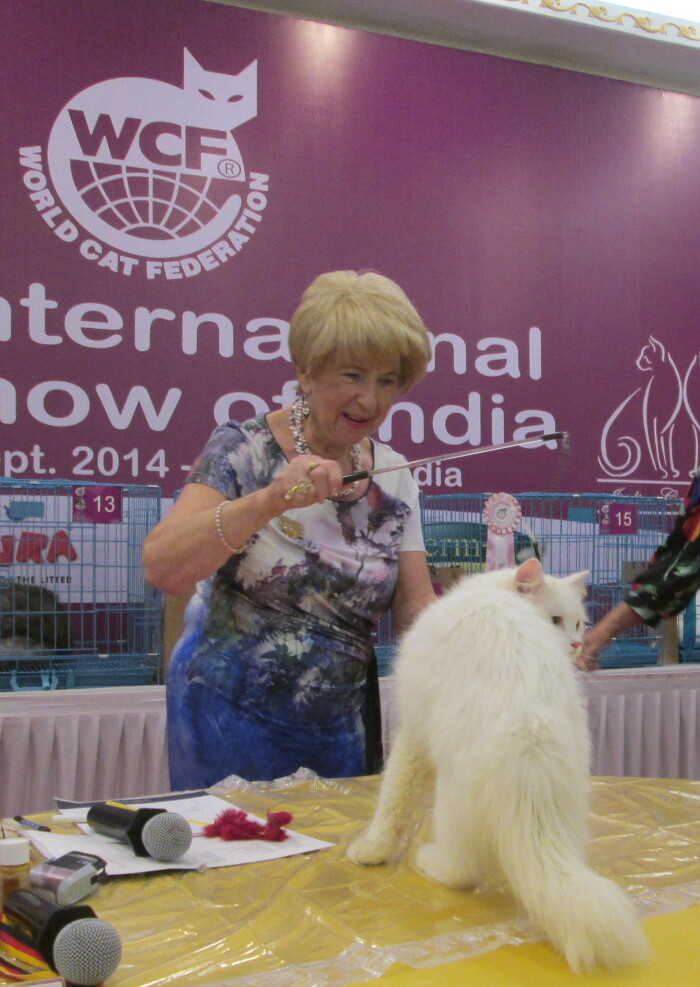
Anneliese Hackmann, President of WCF, judging a cat at the "2nd International Cat Federation" show held at "Stallion Banquets" at Prabhadevi in Mumbai

WCF Philippines World Cat Show 2024 The first ever "World Cat Federation Philippines World Cat Show 2024" was held on 15–16 June at One Ayala in Makati, Philippines. Over 120 cats from 15 countries competed at the 2-day event. The breeds were segregated into 4 coat types: Satin, Silky, Full, and Suede.

WCF Philippines Mindanao National Cat Show 2025

Dongsky, a domestic shorthair, won Best in Show in the household pet category during Mindanao's first National Cat Show held at Ayala Malls Abreeza in Davao City on 19 June 2025. The event, organised by the World Cat Federation and the Society of Feline Enthusiast of the Philippines, gathered various pedigreed and mixed-breed cats from across the country.

== See also ==
- List of cat breeds
- List of cat registries
