= Fédération Internationale Féline =

International federation of cat registries

- Abbreviation: FIFe
- Formation: 1949; 77 years ago
- Founders: Marguerite Ravel
- Founded at: Ghent, Belgium
- Merger of: Fédération Féline Française; Royal Cat Society of Flanders; Associazione Nazionale Felina Italiana; Clube Brasileiro do Gato
- Region served: Worldwide (40 countries)
- Members: 42
- President: Annette Sjödin
- Vice President: Veikko Saarela
- Board of directors: Annette Sjödin, Veikko Saarela, Eric Reijers, Charles Spijker, Jürg Keller-Friskovec, Karl Preiss
- Affiliations: World Cat Congress
- Website: fifeweb.org

Fédération Internationale Féline (FIFe) (lit. 'International Feline Federation') is a globally operating federation of Felidae animals (mainly domestic cats). In 2026, the federation had 42 members from 40 countries. FIFe is one of the nine members of the World Cat Congress, making it one of the major and reputable cat registries for pedigree registration of cat breeds worldwide.

== History ==
FIFe was founded by French cat-lover Madame Marguérite Miggy Ravel in 1949. The federation unofficially started in 1949 in Paris, France, at a meeting between the Fédération Féline Française ("French Cat Federation"), the Royal Cat Society of Flanders, and the Associazione Nazionale Felina Italiana ("Italian National Feline Association"). At the organisation's first general assembly, in Ghent, Belgium, the federation was officially founded. For the occasion, all participants received a cat shaped statuette, in pink sandstone, that Marguerite Ravel had commissioned from the sculptor Jan Martel.

The original name was Fédération Internationale Féline d'Europe (FIFE). In 1972, the Brazilian Cat Club (Portuguese: Clube Brasileiro do Gato) joined, making it necessary to change the Euro-centric name of the federation. The d'Europe (lit. 'of Europe') was dropped, and the abbreviation was changed to FIFe with a lowercase 'e'.

== Recognised breeds ==
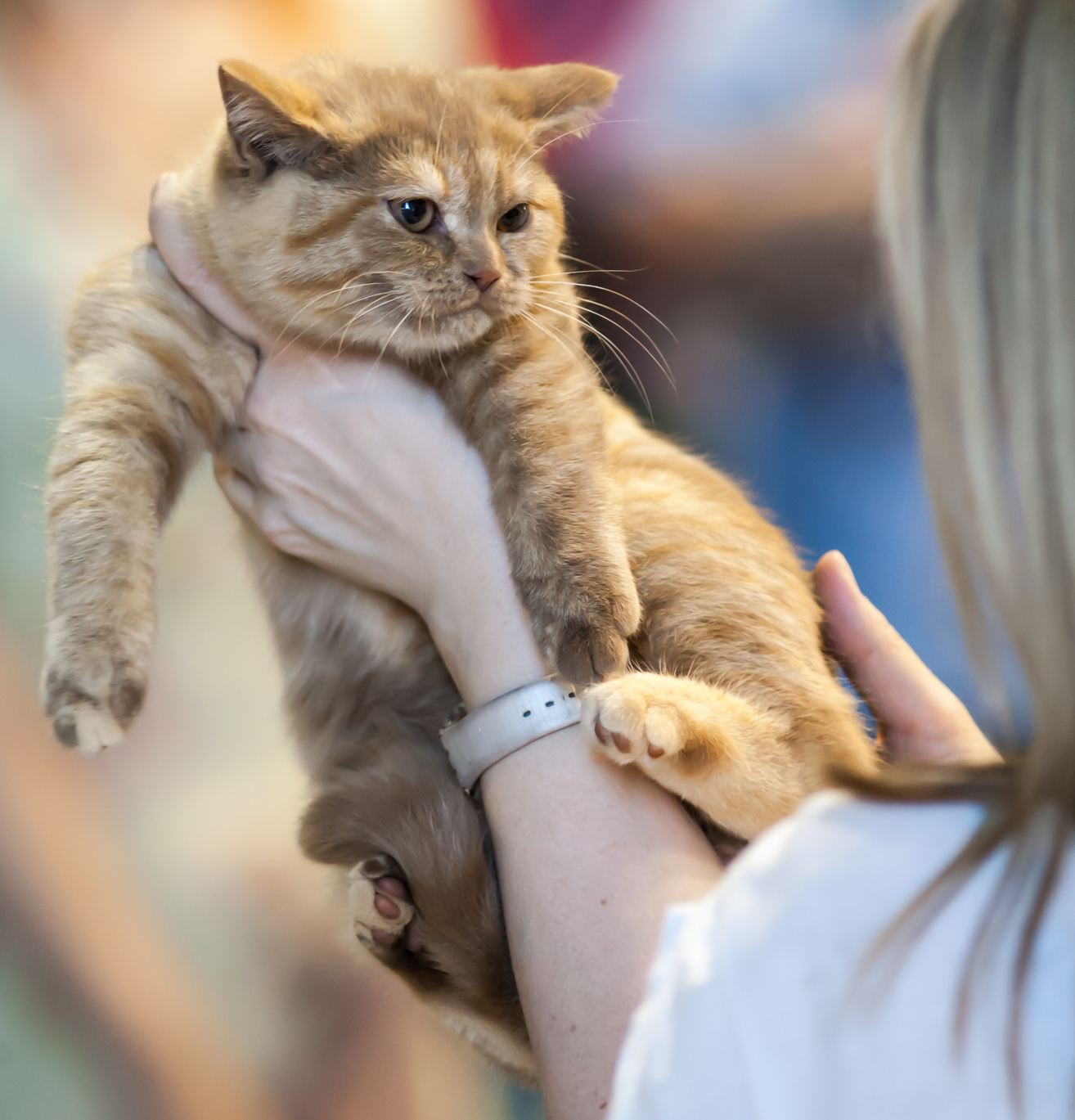
British Shorthair judged at a FIFe cat show in Finland

FIFe currently recognises 48 official breeds of cat for championship competitions. All breeds are divided into four categories and identified with a three-letter code, according to the Easy Mind System (EMS), used by FIFe and all its members to easily identify cats by alphanumeric codes.

== Members ==
Member list
Name	Abbr.	Country	Year
Asociación Felina Argentina	AFA	Argentina	1988
Klub der Katzenfreunde	KKÖ	Austria	1950
Österreichischer Verband für die Zucht und Haltung von Edelkatzen	ÖVEK	Austria	1979
Felis Belgica vzw.	FBe	Belgium	1949
National Federation of Felinology	FFBg	Bulgaria	2006
Federação Felina Brasileira	FFB	Brazil	1972
Felinolog		Belarus	1994
Fédération Féline Helvétique	FFH	Switzerland	1949
China Cat Union	CCU	China	2018
Asociación Club Felino Colombiano	ACFEC	Colombia	2009
Sdružení chovatelů koček	ČSCH-SCHK	Czech Republic	1968
Deutscher Edelkatzenzüchter Verband e.V.	1. DEKZV	Germany	1951
Landsforeningen Felis Danica	FD	Denmark	1950
Eesti Kassikasvatajate Liit	EKL-Felix	Estonia	1994
Asociación Felina Española	ASFE	Spain	1978
Suomen Kissaliitto r.y.	SK	Finland	1961
Fédération Féline Française	FFF	France	1949
Felis Britannica	FB	United Kingdom	2005
Felis Greece	FGR	Greece	1999
Savez Felinoloških Društava Hrvatske	SFDH	Croatia	1994
Felis Hungarica - Magyar Macskások Egyesülete	FH	Hungary	2008
Indonesian Cat Association	ICA	Indonesia	2007
Kynjakettir Kattaræktarfélag Íslands	KKÍ	Iceland	1995
Associazione Nazionale Felina Italiana	ANFI	Italy	1949
Verein der Katzenzüchter Liechtensteins	Aristocat	Liechtenstein	1981
Lithuanian Felinology Association BUBASTE	LFA	Lithuania	1994
Cat Fanciers Clubs Association	CFCA	Latvia	1995
Lux-Cat-Club (Fédération Féline Luxembourgeoise	LCC-FFL	Luxembourg	1983
Association Feline Felis Moldova	FM	Moldova	2015
Federacion Felina de México A.C.	FFM	Mexico	1982
Kelab Kucing Malaysia	KKM	Malaysia	1985
Nederlandse Vereniging van Fokkers & Liefhebbers van Katten	Felikat	Netherlands	1949
Vereniging Mundikat	Mundikat	Netherlands	1979
Norske Rasekattklubbers Riksforbund	NRR	Norway	1951
Polska Federacja Felinologiczna - Felis Polonia	FPL	Poland	2007
Clube Português de Felinicultura	CPF	Portugal	1987
Felis Romania	FAF-FR	Romania	2007
Felis Russica	FRU	Russia	1989
Zveza Felinoloških Društev Slovenije	ZFDS	Slovenia	1981
Federácia Felis Slovakia	FFS	Slovakia	1993
Sveriges Kattklubbars Riksförbund	SVERAK	Sweden	1955
Ukrainian Felinology Union	UFU	Ukraine	1998

== See also ==
- List of cat breeds
- List of cat registries
- Fédération Cynologique Internationale for dogs
