= Colourpoint cat =

Colourpoint or Colorpoint cat may refer to:

- Colourpoint, the World Cat Federation name for a breed classification encompassing both of what other registries consider two separate breeds a) the Himalayan cat, and b) the Javanese cat
- Colourpoint [or Colorpoint] Longhair, a cat breed term with multiple meanings
- Colorpoint Shorthair, a cat breed recognised by the Cat Fanciers' Association and some others, a Siamese cat with non-traditional colouration; the spelling "Colourpoint Shorthair" is usually not used
- Lower-case colourpoint or colorpoint cat, any cat with point coloration
