= Colourpoint =

Colourpoint or colorpoint (occasionally colour point, color-point, etc.) may refer to:

- The acromelanism (colorpoint) pattern of an animal's fur or point coloration more generally
  - Colourpoint, the World Cat Federation name for a breed classification encompassing both of what other registries consider two separate breeds:
    - the Himalayan cat
    - the Javanese cat
  - Colorpoint Shorthair, a cat breed recognised by the Cat Fanciers' Association and some others, a Siamese cat with non-traditional colouration; the spelling "Colourpoint Shorthair" is usually not used
  - Colourpoint [or Colorpoint] Longhair, a cat breed term with multiple meanings
  - Lower-case: colourpoint cat, colourpoint rabbit, etc. – any animal with point colouration
- Colourpoint Books, a book publisher based in Northern Ireland
