= Peterbald =

Breed of cat

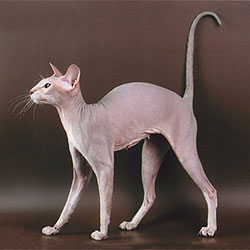
- Lilac Peterbald, female
- Origin: Russia

The Peterbald is a hairless cat breed of Russian origin. It was created in St. Petersburg in 1994 from an experimental cross of a Don Sphynx and an Oriental Shorthair. They have an Oriental build with a dominant hair-losing gene. The breed was accepted for Championship status in 2009.

== History ==
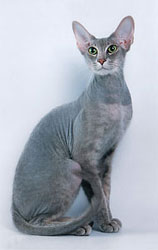
Blue tabby male

The Peterbald breed was born during the latter half of 1994 in St. Petersburg, Russia, the result of an experimental mating of a Don Sphynx (also known as Don Hairless, Donskoy or Donsky) male named Afinogen Myth and an Oriental Shorthair female World Champion named Radma von Jagerhov, by Russian felinologist Olga S. Mironova. The first two litters produced four Peterbald kittens: Mandarin iz Murino, Muscat iz Murino, Nezhenka iz Murino and Nocturne iz Murino. These four Peterbalds were the foundation stock of the breed.

In 1996, the breed was adopted in the Russian Selectional Feline Federation (SFF) and given a standard and an abbreviation (PBD). In 1997 it was adopted in The International Cat Association (TICA) with the abbreviation PD, and in 2003 in the World Cat Federation (WCF) with the abbreviation PBD. Other used handles of the breed are PTB, PD and PSX.

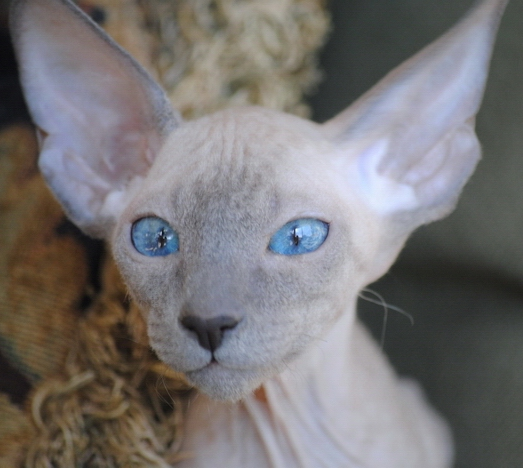
Colourpoint kitten

These days the breed develops in the direction of modern Oriental and Siamese body-types, that is to say a long muzzle, large set-apart ears, flat cheekbones, and an elegant body on long legs. Therefore, all standards for this breed encourage mating with Oriental and Siamese cats and semi-longhair variations of those (such as Balinese and Javanese). The Balinese and Javanese were eliminated from the acceptable outcross list in 2005.

The Peterbald was accepted for Championship class competition, effective May 1, 2009, in the American Cat Fanciers Association (ACFA) in August 2008. Effective May 2008, TICA recognises the "brush coat" Peterbald for Championship competition.

== Characteristics ==
=== Appearance ===
Peterbalds resemble Oriental Shorthairs in body-type. They have a dominant hair-losing gene inherited from the Don Sphynx, and can be born bald, flocked, velour, brush, or with a straight coat. Those born with hair, excepting the straight-coats, can lose their hair over time. They come in all colours and markings.

Members of the breed have a slim and muscular build. They have a narrow and long head with a straight profile, almond-shaped eyes, wedge-shaped muzzle, and large, set-apart ears. They have a long whip-like tail, webbed feet and oval paws that allow them to grasp objects and open levered doorknobs.

=== Behaviour ===
Peterbalds are sweet-tempered, affectionate, peaceful, curious, smart, and energetic. They are medium vocal and tend to follow their owners and want to be with them. Peterbalds typically live in harmony with other cats and pets, and also with children.

== Breeding ban ==
Since 2014, it is illegal in the Netherlands to breed with parent cats which bear genetic mutations or other physical abnormalities that cause health or welfare issues in their offspring. The lack of protective fur in hairless cats, such as the Peterbald, is one of these banned mutations in parent cats.

== See also ==
- Donskoy (cat)
- Sphynx cat
- Elf cat
- List of cat breeds
- List of cat body-type mutations
