= Foreign White =

Foreign white
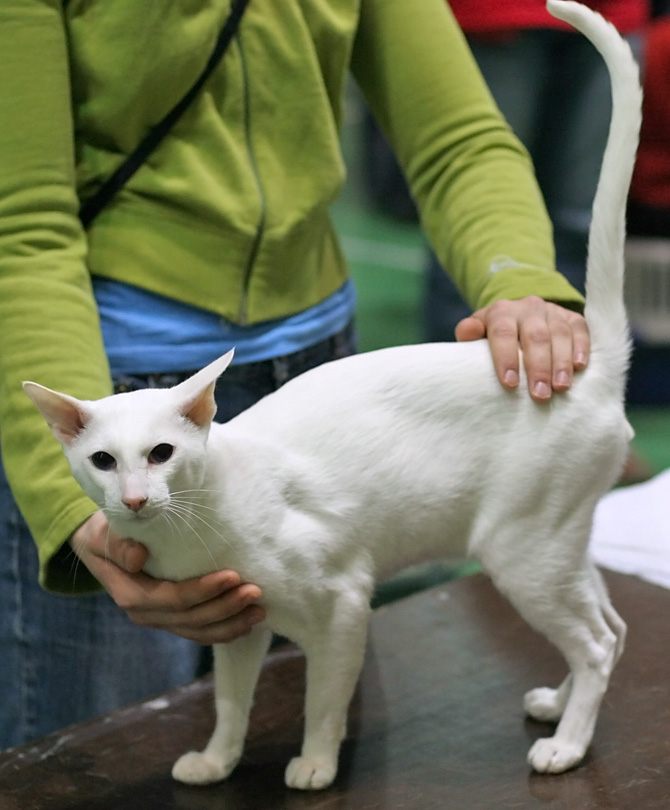
- Foreign White presented in a cat show in Finland, competing as a white Siamese.
- Origin: United Kingdom

Breed standards
- ACF: standard
- GCCF: standard

The Foreign White is cat breed recognised by the Governing Council of the Cat Fancy (GCCF) and the Australian Cat Federation (ACF); in some other registries it is considered simply a color variety of the Siamese or Oriental Shorthair breeds, and not a breed unto itself. The Foreign White is characterized by its long body, triangle-shaped face, uniformly white coat, and deep blue eyes.

== History ==
During the 1960s, the introduction of new colors in the Siamese standard resulted in the birth of fully solid-colored cats. The Foreign White was born from a breeding program aiming to create an all-white Siamese and was recognized by the Governing Council of the Cat Fancy in 1977. Initially, each color of Siamese became a breed; however the federations quickly understood that it was not viable to continue on such a model and merged all the united breeds into one: the Oriental Shorthair. The GCCF decided, however, that the foreign white was a breed in its own right. As of 2022 GCCF and the Australian Cat Federation are the only breeder/fancier organisations to recognize the Foreign White as a breed.

== Genetics and breeding ==
The white coat of the Foreign White is induced by the W gene, the "dominant white". This gene favors the appearance of deafness in white cats with blue eyes. This breeding constraint leads Foreign White breeders to systematically cross their subjects with Siamese cats, and to avoid reproductions with the red colors and the tabby pattern.
