= Colonel Meow =

American Himalayan-Persian crossbread cat (2011-2014)

- Other name: The Colonel
- Species: Felis catus
- Breed: Himalayan–Persian
- Sex: Male
- Born: October 11, 2011; Seattle, Washington, U.S.
- Died: January 29, 2014 (aged 2); Los Angeles, California, U.S.
- Known for: His scowl and long hair
- Owner: Anne Avey

Colonel Meow (October 11, 2011 – January 29, 2014) was an American Himalayan–Persian crossbreed cat, who temporarily held the 2014 Guinness world record for the longest fur on a cat (nine inches or about 23 cm). He became an Internet celebrity when his owners posted pictures of his scowling face to Facebook and Instagram. He was lovingly known by his hundreds of thousands of followers as an "adorable fearsome dictator", a "prodigious Scotch drinker" and "the angriest cat in the world".

== Background ==
Colonel Meow was rescued by Seattle Persian and Himalayan Rescue and was later adopted at a Petco by his owner Anne Avey. He rose to internet fame after his owner posted a picture of his angry-looking scowl to Facebook and Instagram.

== Health complications and death ==
In November 2013, Colonel Meow was hospitalized due to heart problems and underwent a difficult surgery and blood transfusion. On January 30, 2014, his owner announced on Facebook that Colonel Meow had died. She also expressed gratitude for the support of his more than 350,000 followers.

In July 2014, Friskies posted an ad entitled "Cat Summer" and announced that for each view they would donate one meal to needy cats in Colonel Meow's name. The video stars Grumpy Cat as well as other famous internet cats.

== See also ==
- List of individual cats
