= Luna the Fashion Kitty =

Himalayan cat and internet celebrity

Luna
- Species: Felis catus
- Breed: Himalayan
- Sex: Female
- Born: April 14, 2008; Hermosillo, Mexico
- Died: January 1, 2021 (aged 12)
- Known for: Facebook page
- Residence: Phoenix, Arizona
- Appearance: Cream

Luna the Fashion Kitty (April 14, 2008 – January 1, 2021) was a Himalayan cat with a following on the Internet that centered on a Facebook page which shared her daily outfits. The page also shared information about cat grooming and cat rescue info, specifically focusing on the Persian and Himalayan breeds.

== Biography ==
Luna the Fashion Kitty was born on April 14, 2008 and comes from Hermosillo, Sonora, Mexico. Her owner moved to Arizona when she was eight months old.

She died January 1, 2021.

== Social media presence ==
During 2011, Luna's social media and Internet presence expanded rapidly. She was featured in two articles in the widely read fashion blog Racked and in the cat blog Catsparella. Racked suggested that Luna might become "the most famous feline on the internet."

Luna is a weekly contributor to the "Cat's Meow" blog on the cat-focused social media site Catster. She reports on her week, sharing a summary of the stories she has shared on her Facebook page throughout the week with a few extras.

She has been used as a model on Fab, a popular flash sale site. She also inspired a Tumblr blog called "Cats in Fab Boxes."

== "Fashion Blogger" ==
Luna the Fashion Kitty was first referred to as a fashion blogger by the fashion blog Fashionista. After this post, fashion blogs around the world picked up on the label.
