= Oriental Longhair =

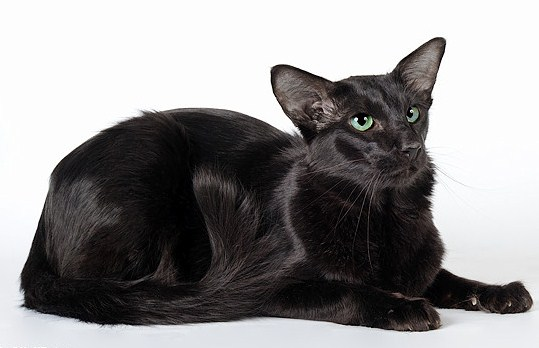
- Oriental Longhair (solid black).
- Other names: British Angora; Javanese; Foreign Longhair; Mandarin

Breed standards
- CFA: standard
- FIFe: standard
- TICA: standard
- WCF: standard
- ACF: standard
- ACFA/CAA: standard

The Oriental Longhair is a variety of domestic cat closely related to the Oriental Shorthair. The Oriental Longhair in some registries, such as The International Cat Association (TICA), it is considered a separate breed. In others, such as the Cat Fanciers' Association (CFA), it is a division, along with the short-haired variety, of a merged breed, the Oriental. With no globally recognised naming convention, other cat fanciers may refer to this type as Foreign Longhair, Javanese or Mandarin. It was formerly known as the British Angora before being renamed in 2002 by British cat fanciers in order to avoid confusion with the Turkish Angora.

== Description ==
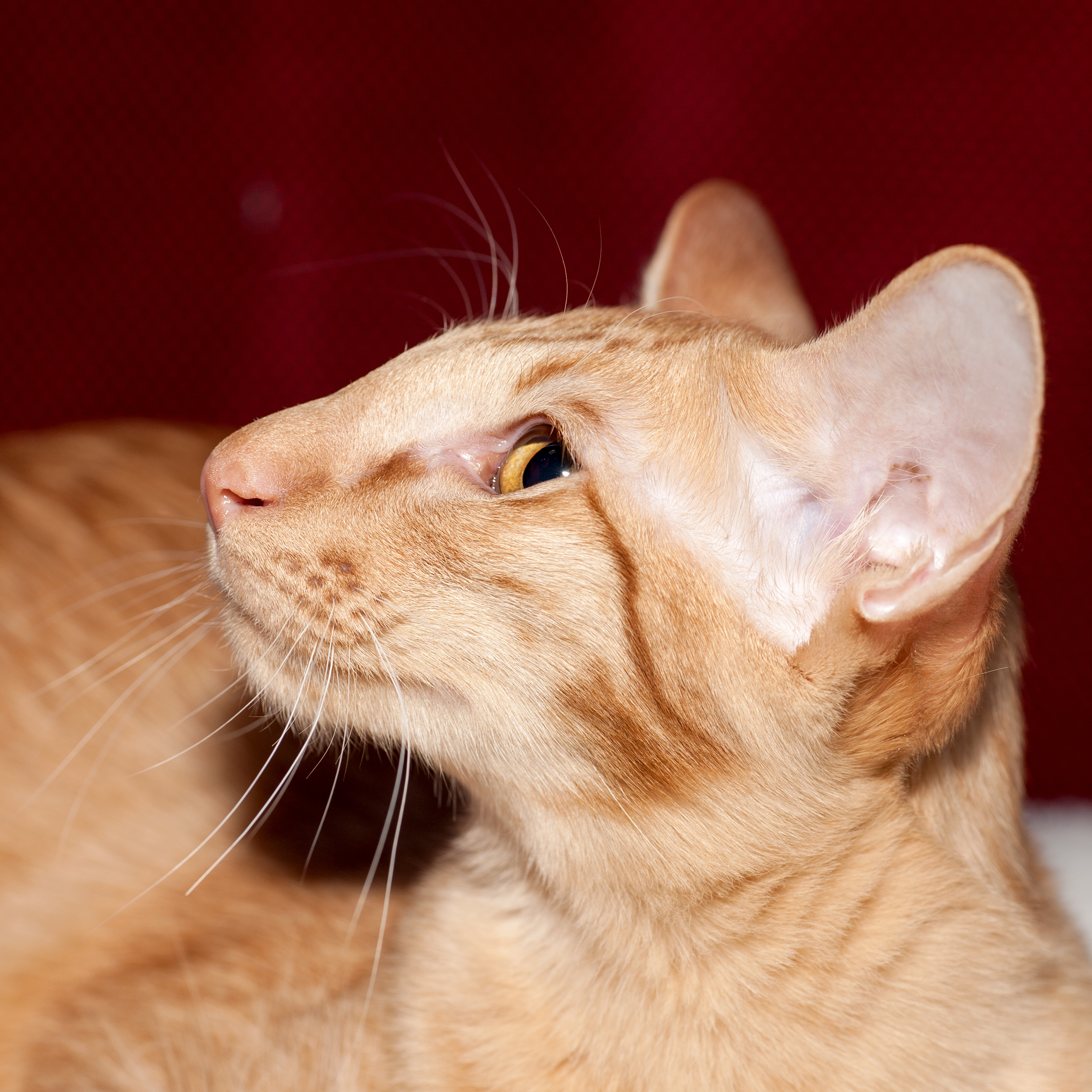
Oriental Longhairs have the same wedge-shaped heads as modern Siamese cats

Oriental Longhairs feature a long, tubular, Oriental-style body with a longer silky coat. The range of possible coat colours includes everything from self-coloured (black, blue, chocolate, lilac, cinnamon, caramel, fawn, red, cream and apricot), tortoiseshell, smoke (silver undercoat), shaded or tipped, tabby or white. The eyes are almond shaped. The preferred eye colour for Oriental Longhairs is green; except for the whites, which may have green or blue eyes, or be odd-eyed (two different coloured eyes).

If an Oriental Longhair is bred to an Oriental shorthair or a Siamese, the kittens will all be short-haired. This is because the gene for long hair is recessive. The kittens will, however, be a variant, a carrier of the long-hair gene. If such a "variant" is bred to a cat with long hair, or to another variant, they may produce both short-haired and long-haired kittens. Variants may have a slightly longer coat than Oriental Shorthairs, but this is not always the case.

== Behavior ==
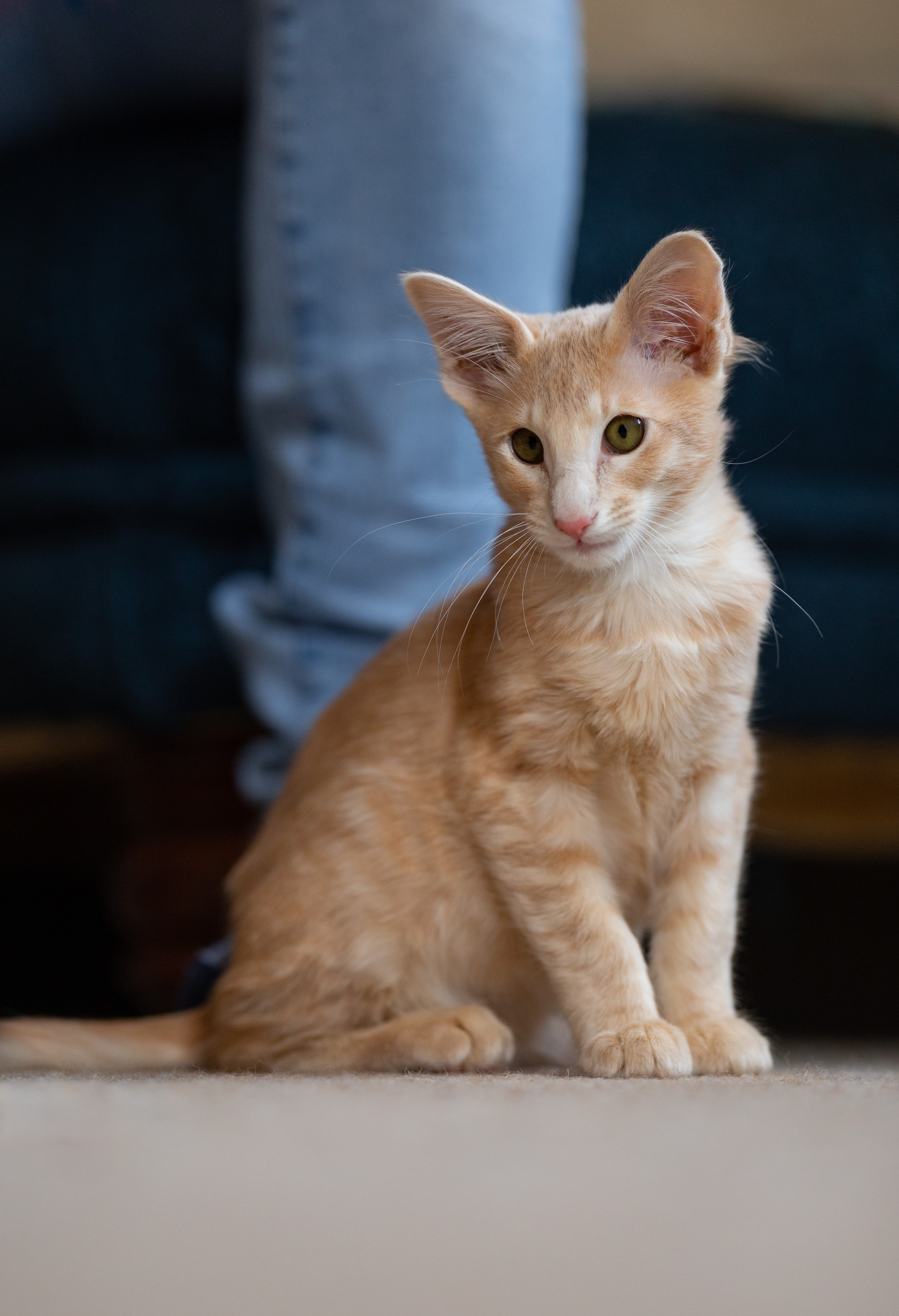
Red tabby kitten

The Oriental Longhair is an active cat that likes to play. If the owner does not have the time to do so, it will often find a toy to play on its own. The breed enjoys jumping and does it well, usually without breaking any objects due to its agility and elegance. Oriental Longhairs are highly intelligent and are ideal companions for people who like their pets to be close to them. They are loyal and most get along well with other cats, especially if they are of the same breed group. Oriental Longhairs are not adapted to a life of living alone and prefer an interactive home.

Orientals, like their cousin breed the Siamese, have loud and expressive voices that are used often. Many Orientals take to leash training quickly if started young. They have been known to open cabinets, doors and even refrigerators. This breed group is often recommended for more experienced cat keepers.

== Health ==
The Oriental Longhair typically lives for around 15 years. Some can suffer from flat-chested kitten syndrome, which is a condition where the cat's chest does not develop properly. This can result in breathing difficulties. This breed can suffer from Amyloidosis and cancer.

== Gallery ==
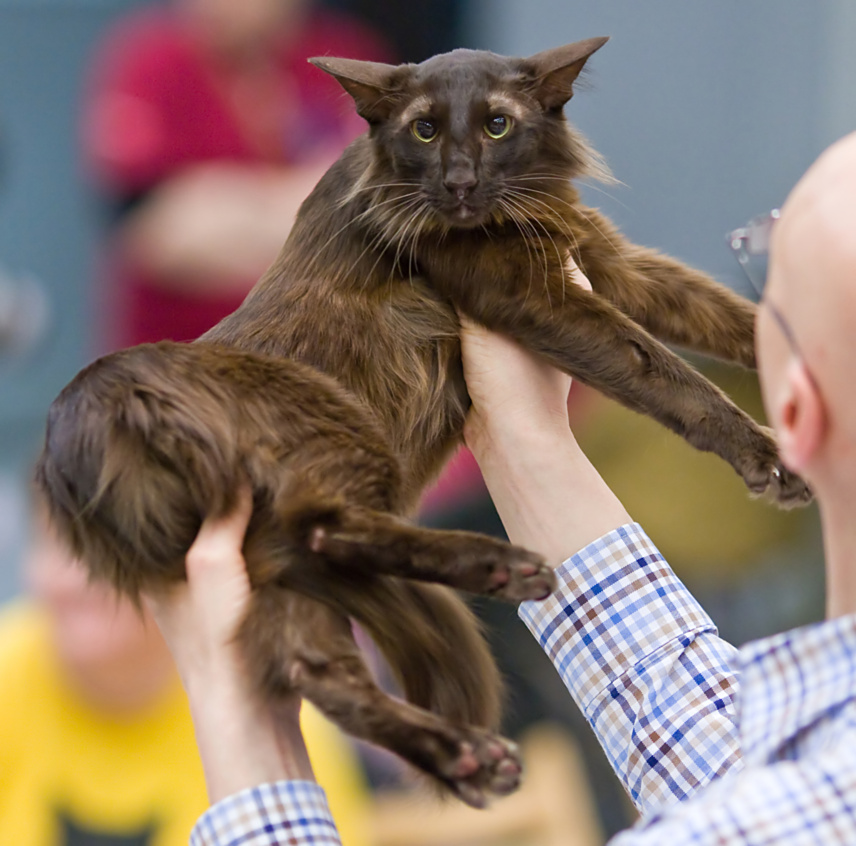
Chocolate adult

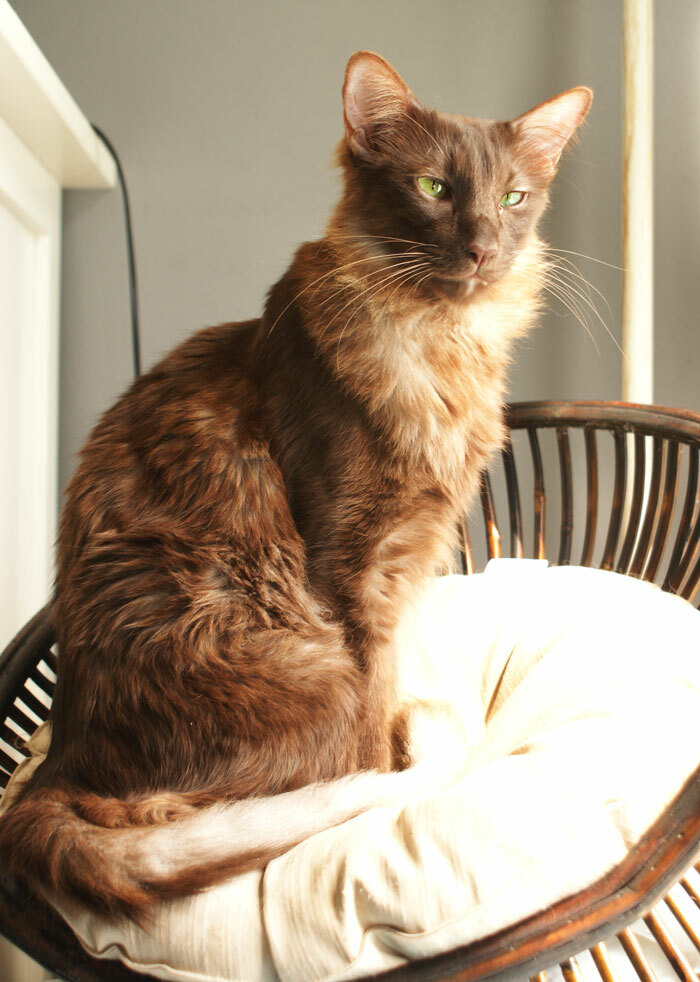
Chocolate smoke adult

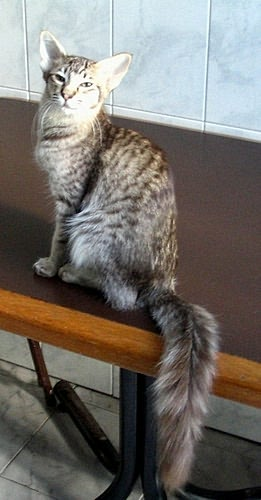
Chocolate spotted tabby adult

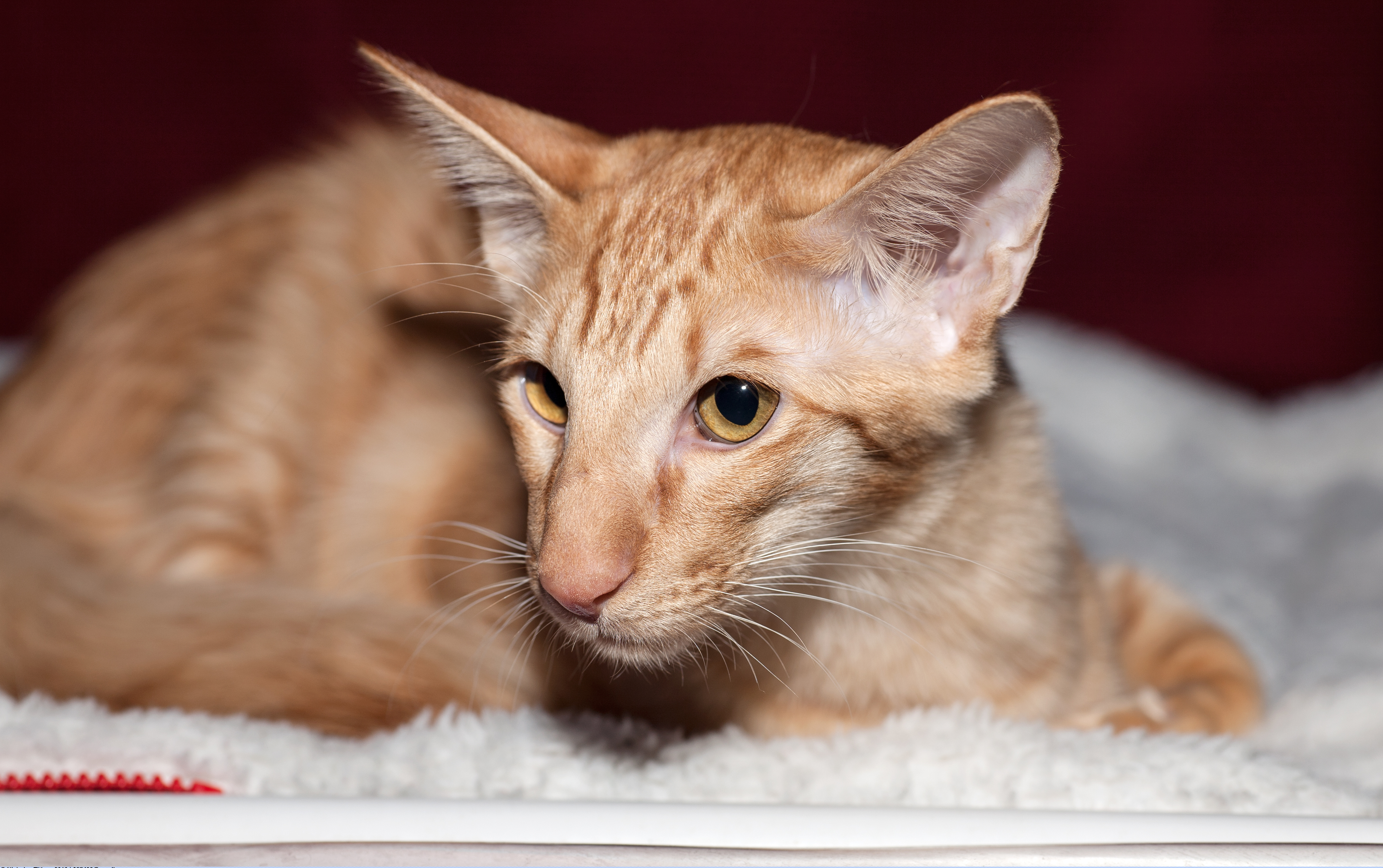
Red tabby adult

== See also ==
- Javanese cat, for the non-traditional coloured Balinese cat
- Oriental Shorthair
- List of cat breeds
