= Oriental Shorthair =

Breed of cat

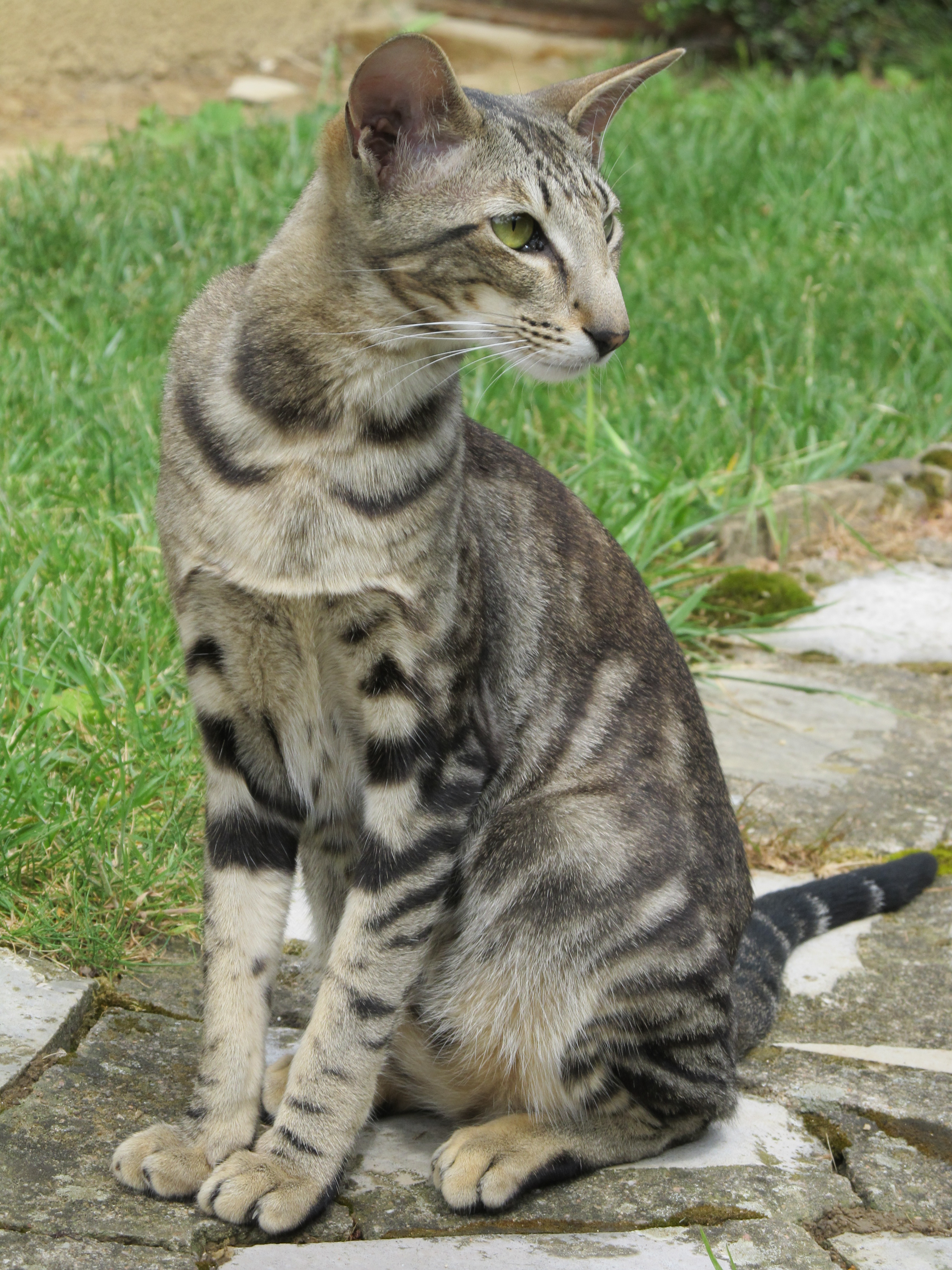
- Green-eyed black blotched (“classic”) tabby adult
- Other names: Foreign Type
- Origin: United States
- Foundation bloodstock: Siamese (landrace from Thailand)

Breed standards
- FIFe: standard
- TICA: standard
- WCF: standard
- ACF: standard
- ACFA/CAA: standard
- CCA-AFC: standard
- GCCF: standard

The Oriental Shorthair is a breed of domestic cat that is developed from and closely related to the Siamese cat. It maintains the modern Siamese head and body type but appears in a wide range of coat colours and patterns. Like the Siamese, Orientals have almond-shaped eyes, a triangular head shape, large ears, and an elongated, slender, and muscular body. Unlike the breed's blue-eyed Siamese forebear, Orientals are usually green-eyed.

In 1977 the Oriental Shorthair was accepted by the Cat Fanciers' Association (CFA) for championship competition. Since 1997, it has also received recognition from the Governing Council of the Cat Fancy (GCCF) and various other cat breeding organisations. The breed is among the most popular among CFA members.

The Oriental Longhair breed differs only with respect to coat length.

== History ==
According to the CFA, "Orientals represent a diverse group of cats that have their foundation in the Siamese breed." The Siamese foundation stock were landrace cats from Siam (today, Thailand) in both pointed and full colours, imported to the UK and later selectively bred since the end of the 1800s, becoming one of the most popular cat breeds. The gene that causes the colour to be restricted to the points is a recessive gene; therefore, the random-bred cat population in Siam was largely full-coloured (non-pointed). When the foundation cats were selectively bred, the pointed cats were eventually registered as Siamese, while the others were referred to as "non-blue eyed Siamese" or "foreign shorthair".

While the breed's genetic roots are ultimately in Thailand, it was formally developed in the US by a number of New York area cat breeders, led by Vicky and Peter Markstein (PetMark cattery), who in 1971–72 were intrigued by tabby point (US: lynx point) patterned and solid coloured cats of a Siamese body type at Angela Sayers' Solitaire Cattery and at Patricia White's. These were based on solid-coloured cats with the oriental-type body of a Siamese, bred by Baroness von Ullmann over the 1950s. An "Oriental Shorthairs International" was formed in 1973, and Peter Markstein presented the breed to the 1976 Annual CFA meeting, at the same time as the Havana Brown was presented by Joe Bittaker.

== Breed recognition ==
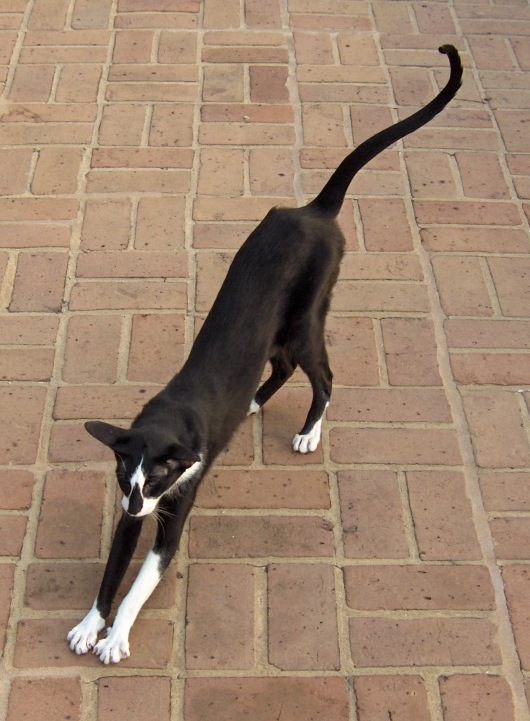
Black and white bicolour male displays the typical long, tubular Oriental body

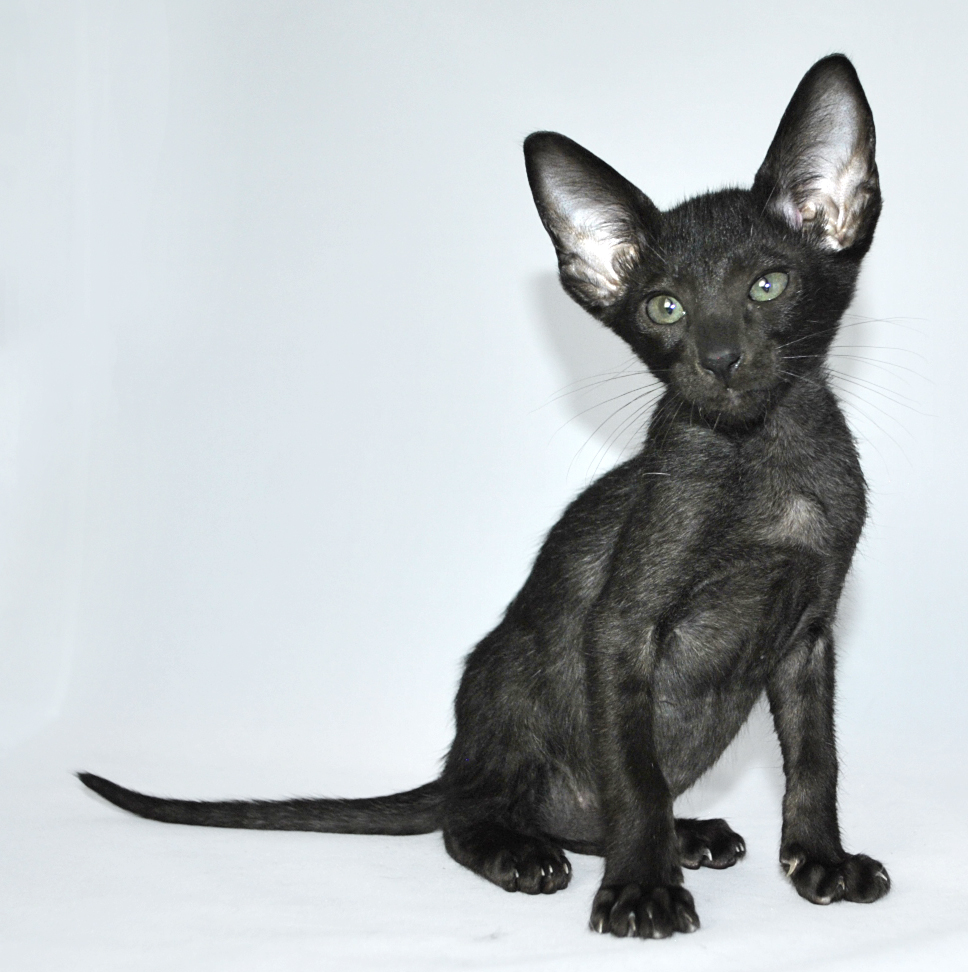
3-month-old solid black male kitten

The Oriental Shorthair was accepted as an actual breed for championship competition in the US-headquartered CFA in 1977. In 1985, the CFA recognised the bicolour variant. Two decades later, in 1997, the breed was also recognised by the UK-based GCCF, but with some differences from CFA on coat conformation. GCCF publishes separate breed registration policies for a number of specific-coat Oriental Shorthair variants today. The Germany-based World Cat Federation (WCF) recognises the breed, but with colour requirements that are comparatively unrestrictive in some way, but notably opposed to white ("all colours and patterns without white and without points are recognised").

=== Havana brown and Foreign White ===
In some of the cat registries, the solid chocolate variety is referred to as the Havana Brown. Solid white cats are sometimes recognised as Foreign White.

=== Colourpoint ===
In the Cat Fanciers' Association (CFA), some of the point-coloured offspring from Oriental Shorthair parents are considered "any other variety" (AOV), but depending on the pedigree, some may compete as Colourpoints. In The International Cat Association (TICA) and many other cat fancier and breeder associations, these cats are considered to be, and compete as, Siamese, when recognised at all.

=== Longhair ===
The long-haired version of the breed, the Oriental Longhair, is recognised since 1995 by CFA. It differs from its shorthaired counterpart by carrying a pair of the recessive long hair genes.

== Characteristics ==
Head shape

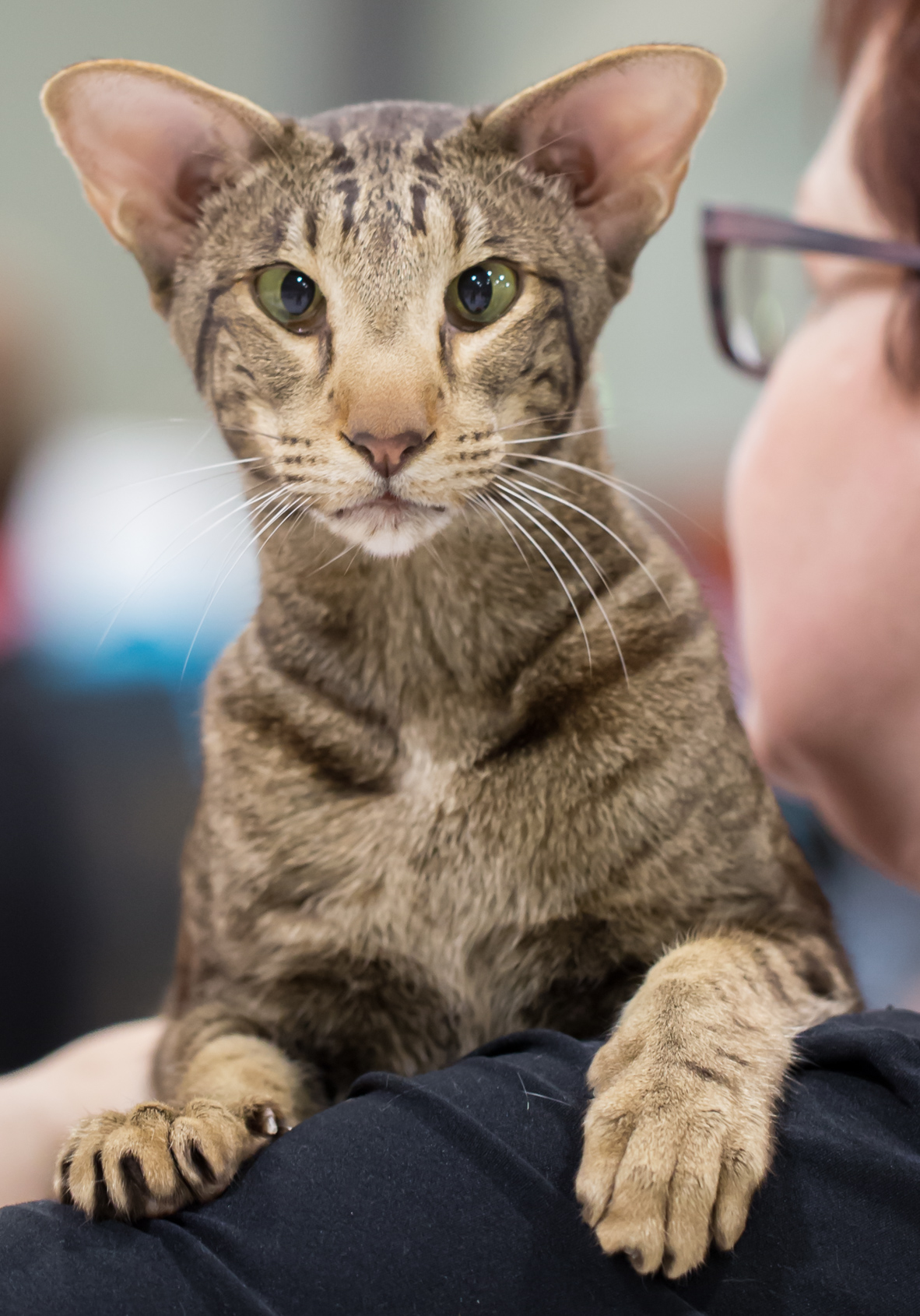
More moderate type chocolate tabby

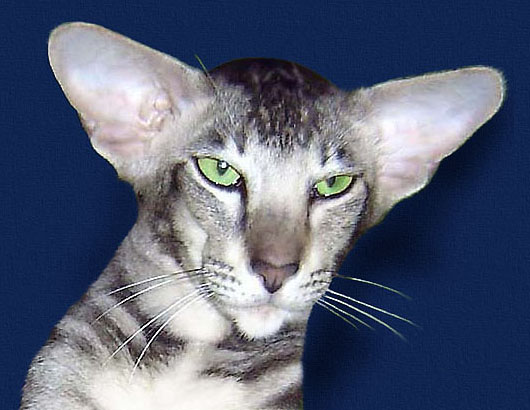
More extreme modern type black silver tabby

Orientals typically have large ears and wedge-shaped heads. The line of the nose, eyes, and the middle of the ear form a triangular wedge.

=== Body ===
The Oriental Shorthair is a member of the oriental family of breeds, which are related to the modern-style Siamese, and can be found in various colours and patterns, such as solid or tabby, silver (smoke, shaded), tortoiseshell, and parti-colour (bi- and tricolour; any of the above, with white). Not all variants are acceptable to all organisations that recognise the breed.

Conforming Oriental Shorthairs, like any of the Siamese type, have almond-shaped eyes and a wedge-shaped head with large ears. Their bodies are typically "sleek" but muscular. The Oriental is a medium size cat. On average, males weigh from 3.5–5.5 kg (8–12 lb), with females weighing less than 3.5 kg (8 lb).

=== Coat colouration ===
Under recognised breed standards, more than 300 coat colour and pattern combinations are theoretically possible, although permitted colourations differ between registries. These coat combinations are derived from one or more of the following base colours and patterns:

Colours

- All Western and oriental base colours: black ("ebony"), chocolate, cinnamon, red, white
- Dilution and dilution-modifiers: blue, lilac ("lavender"), fawn, caramel, cream, apricot
- Silver
  - Shaded: Will have a white undercoat with only the tips being coloured
  - Smoke: The hair shaft in solid coats will have a narrow band of white at the base which can only be seen when the hair is parted. This white undercoat to any of the above colours (except white, of course) is provided by an interaction of two different genes.

Patterns

- Solid: The coat colour is uniform across the entire cat. Each hair shaft should be the same colour from root to tip, and be free of banding and tipping.
- Tabby: Each hair shaft should have a band of colour around the middle of the hair shaft. All four tabby variants are recognised: classic, mackerel, spotted and ticked.
- Tortoiseshell: Has patches of red and/or cream in addition to their base colouration, which may be well-defined blotches of colour, brindled or marbled patterns. This colour pattern is referred to as tortoiseshell (or "tortie" for short).
- Parti-colour (bicolour or tricolour): The bi- and tricolour pattern is created by the addition of a white spotting gene to any of the other accepted colours/patterns. For tricolour tortoiseshell is required as well. A true bi/tricolour cat will have white on its belly, on the legs/paws, and in an inverted "V" on the face.
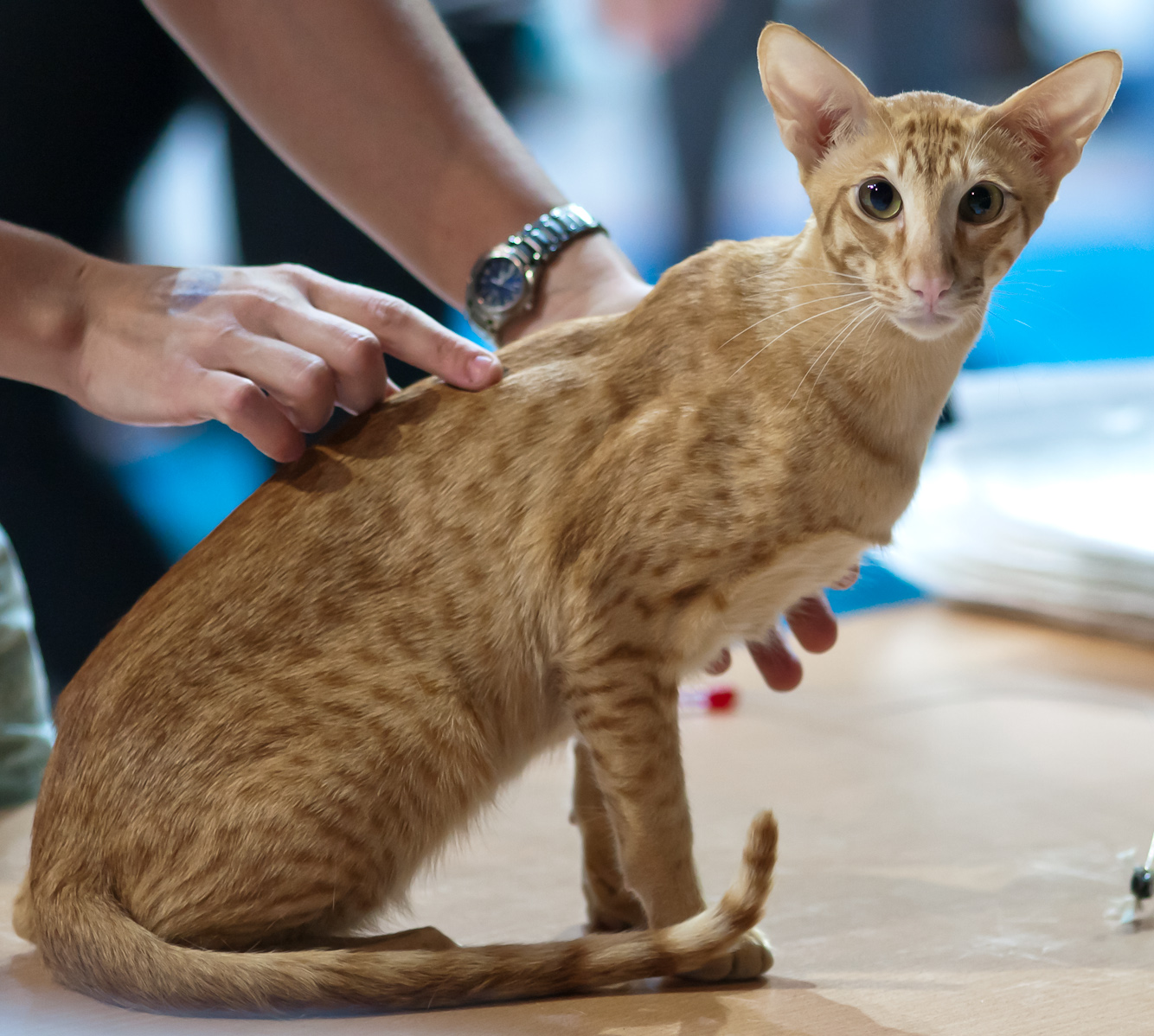
Red spotted tabby

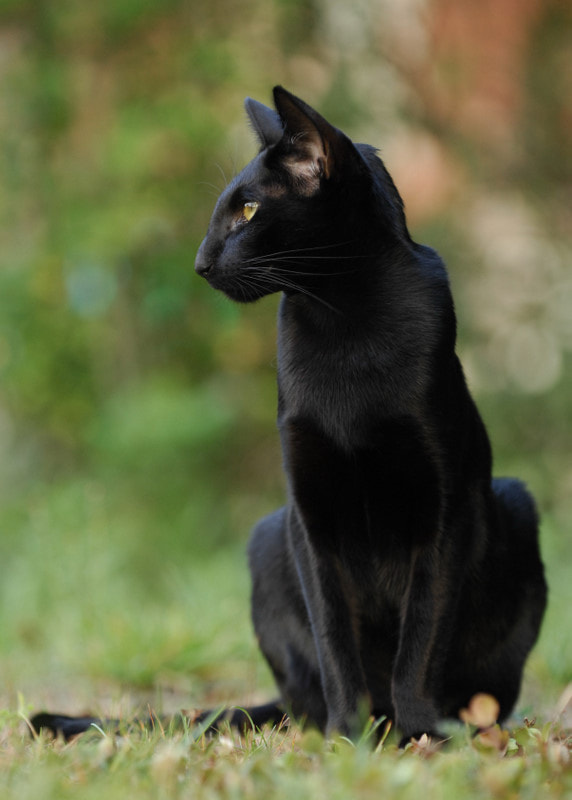
Solid black

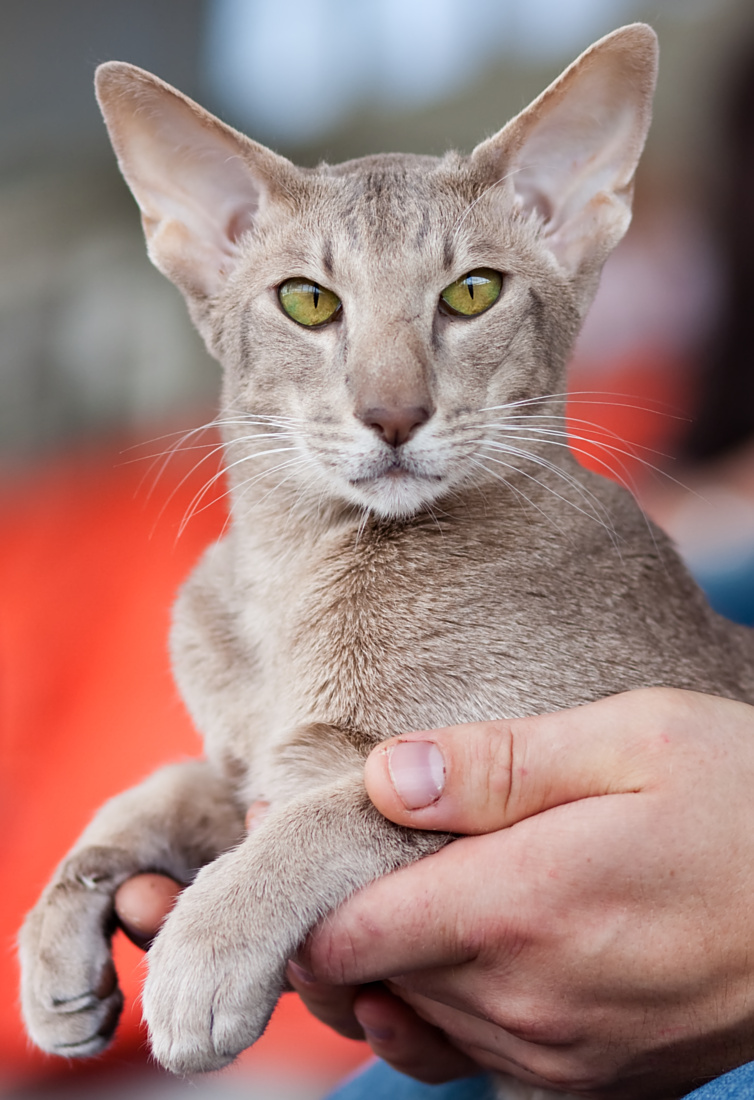
Lilac tabby

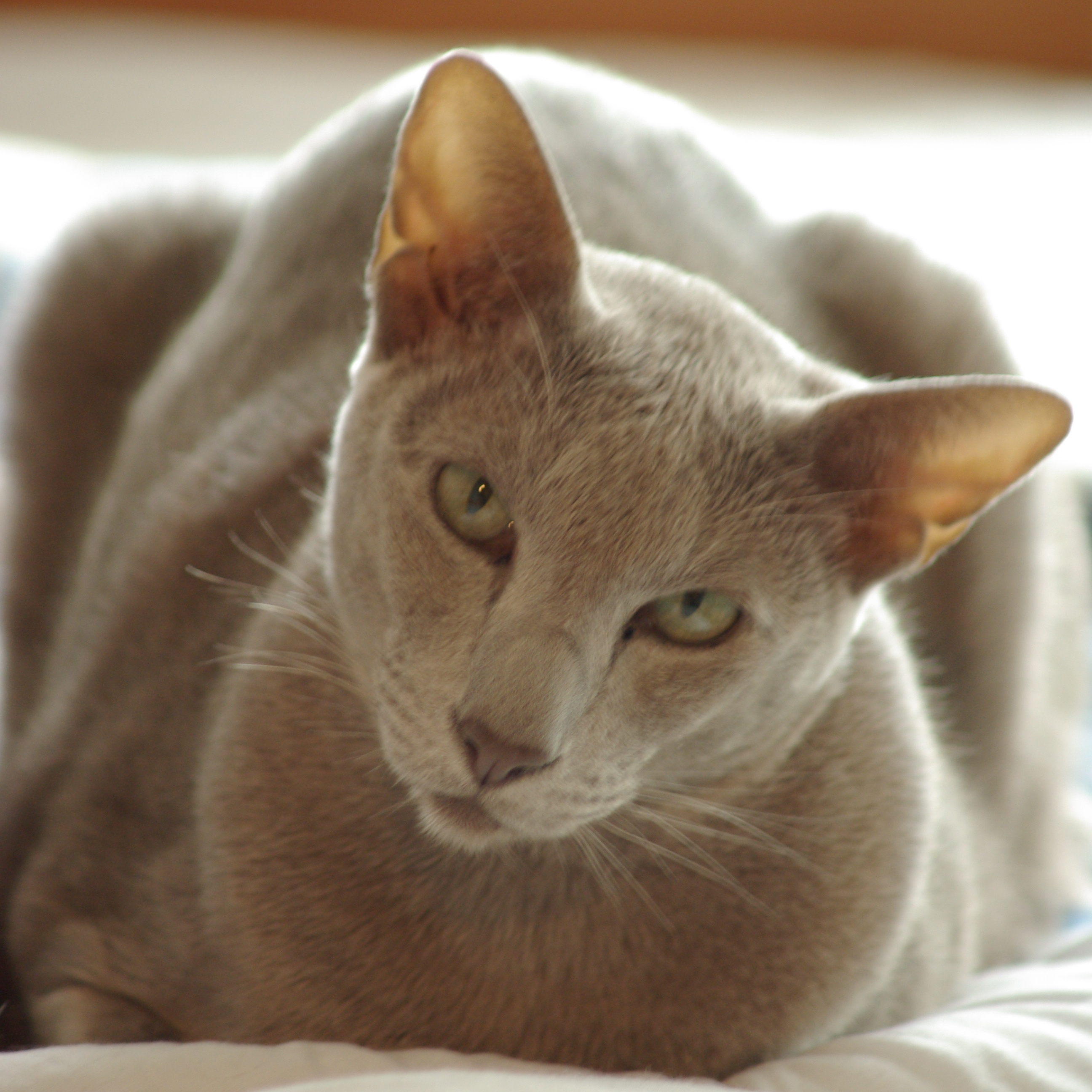
Solid lilac-based caramel

=== Behaviour ===
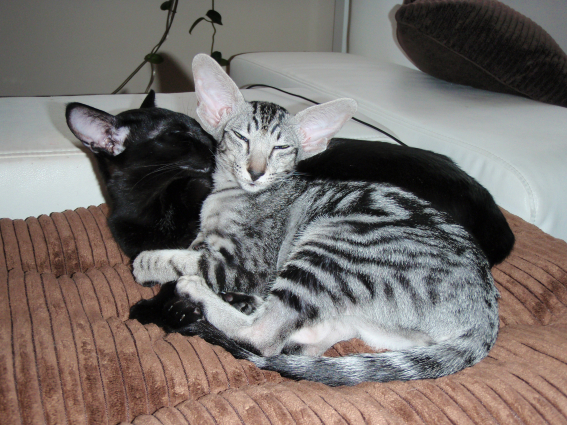
Orientals are a social breed, as demonstrated by this solid black and black silver tabby

Their personalities are very similar to the Siamese; they have high locomotion levels and are natural conversationalists. Orientals are social, intelligent, and many are rather vocal. The adult Oriental Shorthair cats are considered to be active, curious and interested about surroundings by breeders and veterinarians. They often remain playful into adulthood, with many enjoying playing fetch. Despite their slender appearance, they are athletic and can leap into high places. They prefer to live in pairs or groups and also seek human interaction.

== See also ==
- List of cat breeds
- Foreign White
- Havana Brown
- Peterbald
- Colourpoint Shorthair
- Siamese cat
