= Colourpoint Longhair =

Colorpoint Longhair or Colourpoint Longhair (among other spellings) is a disused term for one of multiple varieties of domestic cat, and may refer to:

- Javanese cat, the long-haired variant of the broadly accepted Colorpoint Shorthair breed (which is essentially a Siamese cat with non-Siamese colouration); note, however, that the World Cat Federation confusingly uses "Javanese" to refer to the Oriental Longhair breed, related but different
- Colourpoint, the World Cat Federation name for the long-haired version of its definition of the Colorpoint Shorthair (which includes both Siamese-standard and -nonstandard colouration); this is a breed classification encompassing both of what other registries call:
  - The Himalayan cat (essentially, the Javanese but with colors limited to those the Siamese); and
  - The Javanese cat, i.e. a long-haired cat with any of the colourations that are nonstandard for Siamese and Himalayan, but found in the non-WCF Colourpoint Shorthair)
- Any colour-pointed, long-haired mongrel domestic cat (uncapitalised, and in various spellings, e.g. "colourpoint long-haired", etc.)
