= Himalayan cat =

Breed of cat

Himalayan
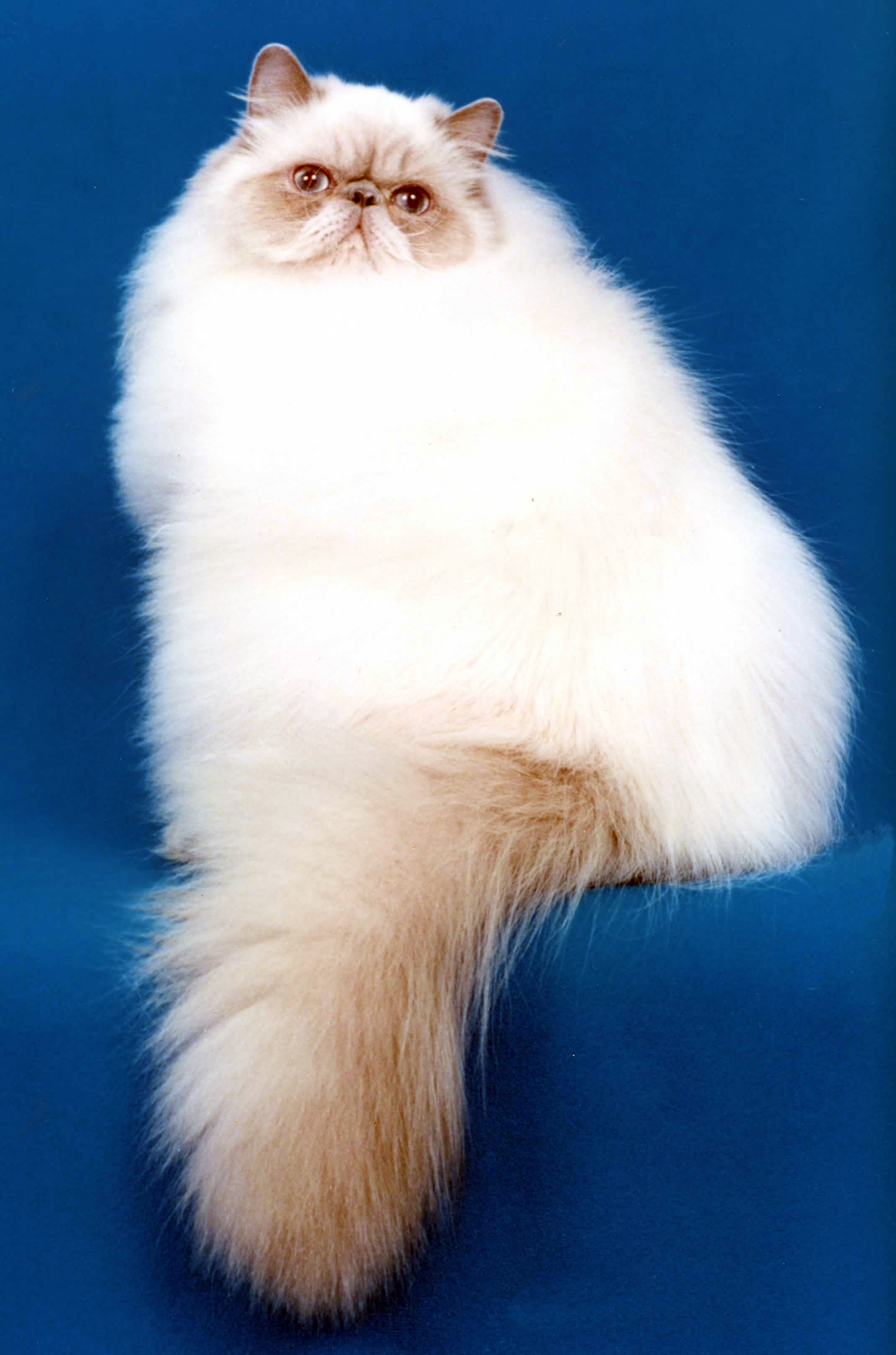
- Lilac point Himalayan
- Other names: Himalayan Persian; Colourpoint Persian; Longhaired Colourpoint (obsolete); Siamese–Persian (obsolete)
- Common nicknames: Himmy
- Origin: Nepal (Himalayas); United States (America); Iran (Persia); Thailand (Siam)

Breed standards
- CFA: standard
- TICA: standard
- ACFA/CAA: standard
- CCA-AFC: standard
- Other: https://web.archive.org/web/20060610032029/http://aaceinc.org/pages/breeds/him.htm

Notes
- Recognized only as a variant of Persian by some organizations, not as a separate breed.

The Himalayan (short for Himalayan Persian, or Colourpoint Persian as it is commonly referred to in Europe) is a breed or sub-breed of long-haired cat similar in type to the Persian, with the exception of its blue eyes and its point colouration, which were derived from crossing the Persian with the Siamese. Some registries may classify the Himalayan as a long-haired sub-breed of Siamese, or a colourpoint sub-breed of Persian. The World Cat Federation has merged them with the Colourpoint Shorthair and Javanese into a single breed, the Colourpoint.

== History ==
Work to formally establish a breed with combined Persian and Siamese traits, explicitly for the cat fancy, began in the United States in the 1930s at Harvard University, under the term Siamese–Persian, and the results were published in the Journal of Heredity in 1936, but were not adopted as a recognised breed by any major fancier groups at the time. Brian Sterling-Webb independently developed the cross-breed over a period of ten years in the UK, and in 1955 it was recognised there as the Longhaired Colourpoint by the Governing Council of the Cat Fancy (GCCF).

Cat breeder Jean Mill from California, US, took a series of graduate classes in genetics at the University of California, Davis. By 1948, she was one of three breeders independently crossing the Persian and Siamese to create the Himalayan cat.

Separate US-based breeding efforts had begun around 1950, and a breeder known to sources simply as Mrs. Goforth received breed recognition from the Cat Fanciers' Association (CFA) near the end of 1957 for the Himalayan. Early breeders were mostly interested in adding Siamese colouration to long-haired cats, and therefore reinforced the stock by outbreeding to Persians only to retain the Persian trait dominance. However, by the 1960s, some were re-introducing Siamese stock and producing less "Persian-style" cats, In the 1980s, a concerted effort to re-establish the breed along more formally Persian lines ultimately caused the breed to be merged into Persian as a variant in some registries (e.g. in 1984 by CFA), and a decline in the "old" or Siamese-like specimens.

== Recognition ==
The Himalayan is considered a colour variant of the Persian and not a separate breed by the CFA and the GCCF.The International Cat Association considers the Himalayan a part of the Persian Breed Group and the American Cat Fanciers Association considers the Himalayan a separate breed.

== Appearance ==
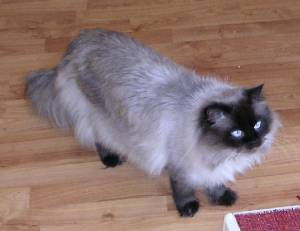
A 3-year-old male seal-point doll-faced Himalayan

The Himalayan resembles the Persian in type, conformation, and coat length and texture. The Himalayan does not resemble the Siamese in type.

=== Body ===
The Himalayan is medium to large in size with a cobby body and low legs.

=== Head ===
The Himalayan's head is round and massive with a round face and a thick neck. The nose is snubbed and pushed in.

=== Ears ===
The ears of the Himalayan are small, round-tipped, and slightly pointed forward.

=== Eyes ===
The eyes are large and round and spread well apart. Pointed Himalayans have blue eyes, non-pointed Himalayans have copper eyes except for the silver and golden tabby which have green eyes.

=== Coat ===
The Himalayan has a long and thick coat all over the body including the tail and ear and toe tufts.

==== Coat colours ====
The Himalayan comes in most colours with prohibited colours being mink and sepia.

== Health ==
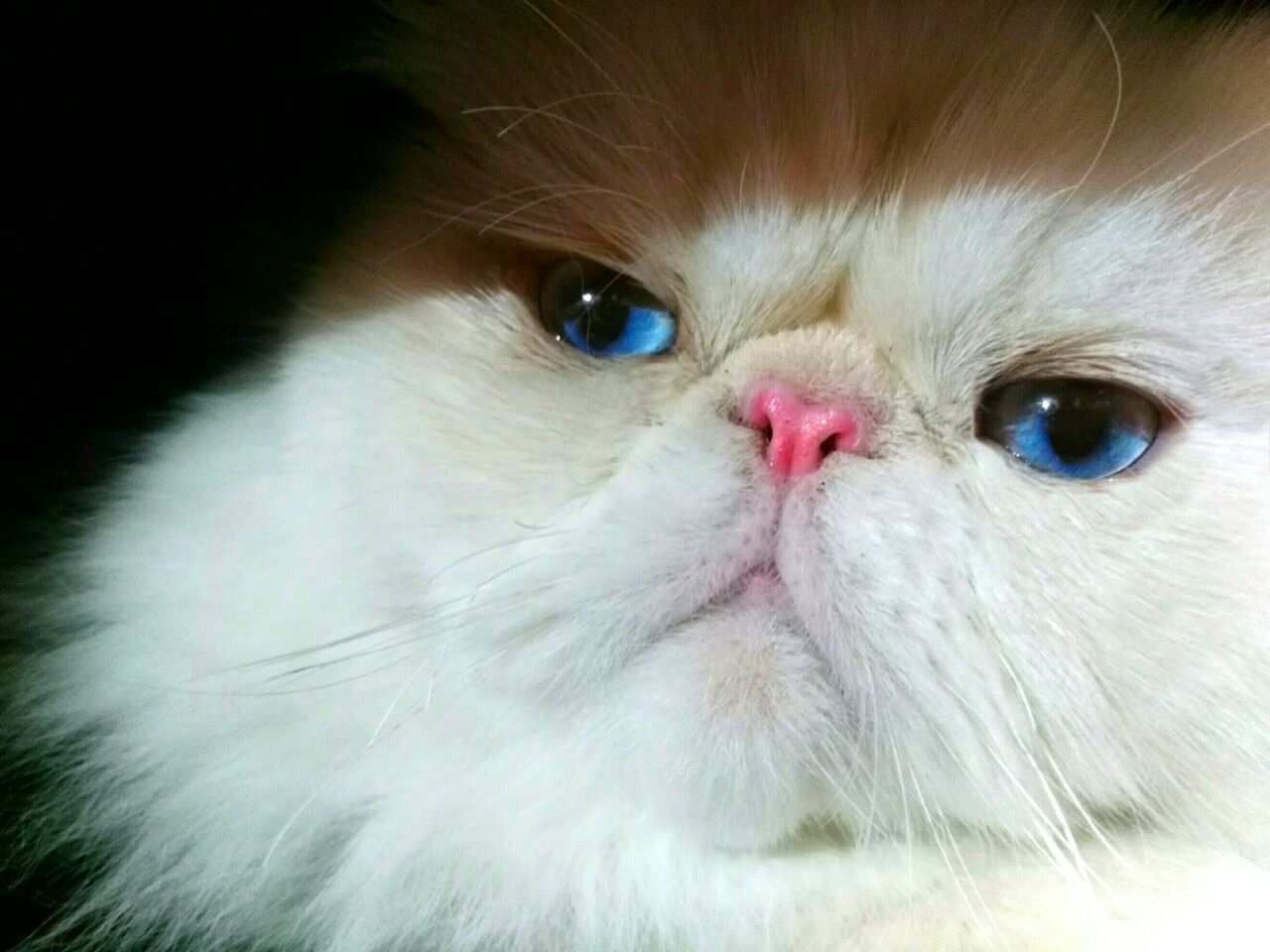
A red-point showing the typical brachycephalic peke face

Like the Persian, the Himalayan is a brachycephalic breed which predisposes it to health issues such as respiratory infections, epiphora, corneal abrasions, ulcers, and corneal sequestration. Himalayans are also susceptible to polycystic kidney disease, a hereditary condition that results in cysts growing in the kidney. Himalayans have a higher incidence of feline asthma. In a review of over 5,000 cases of urate urolithiasis the Himalayan was under-represented, with an odds ratio of 0.37. A study of cats presented to the University of Missouri Veterinary Medical Teaching Hospital that underwent radiography found four Himalayans out of a population of 16 to have hip dysplasia, higher than the 6.6% average for all cats.

Himalayans are predisposed to dermatophytosis (ringworm).

The Himalayan is also predisposed to urticaria pigmentosa, a type of benign mast cell disorder.

Idiopathic facial dermatitis, also known as facial dermatitis of the Persian and Himalayan cat, is a type of dermatitis only observed in the Persian and Himalayan cat. It is characterised by greasy skin, debris adhering to the folds of the face and nose, ceruminous otitis externa, secondary bacterial folliculitis and Malassezia dermatitis, and pruritus. Onset is at 10 months to six years.

== In popular culture ==
- In the CBS television detective series Tucker's Witch (1982), a Himalayan cat named Dickens is the familiar to witch Amanda Tucker. Amanda Tucker has a telepathic link with Dickens, who provides her and her husband with clairvoyant clues to help them solve mysteries. Dickens is featured prominently in the show's opening and closing credits.
- In the spoof film Date Movie (2006), Mr. Jinxers is a parody of his Meet the Parents counterpart.
- In the movies Homeward Bound: The Incredible Journey (1993) and Homeward Bound II: Lost in San Francisco (1996), one of the main characters is a Himalayan cat named Sassy (voiced by Sally Field).
- The main character of the anime/manga Prince of Tennis, Ryoma Echizen, owns a Himalayan cat named Karupin (or Kalpin in the English translation).
- Martha Stewart owns three Himalayans, named after composers: Beethoven, Mozart and Bartók. The cats have been featured in her commercials for Kmart, on her television show, Martha Stewart Living, and in her magazine, such as the cover of the February 1999 issue.
- A Himalayan named Luna the Fashion Kitty became a social media phenomenon in 2011 with a popular Facebook page, a website, and several media references.
- A Himalayan-Persian named Colonel Meow became an Internet celebrity in 2012, and entered Guinness World Records 2014 as the cat with the longest fur.
- Mr. Jinx (also known as Jinxy, or simply just Jinx) from the Meet the Parents trilogy is a seal-point peke-faced Himalayan with an all-black tail.
- The "narrator" of David Michie's series of books that begins with "The Dalai Lama's Cat" is a Himalayan cat.
- A community-created cosmetic item for the Medic and Spy classes in the 2007 computer game Team Fortress 2 is a Red Point Himalayan cat named "Harry".

== Gallery ==
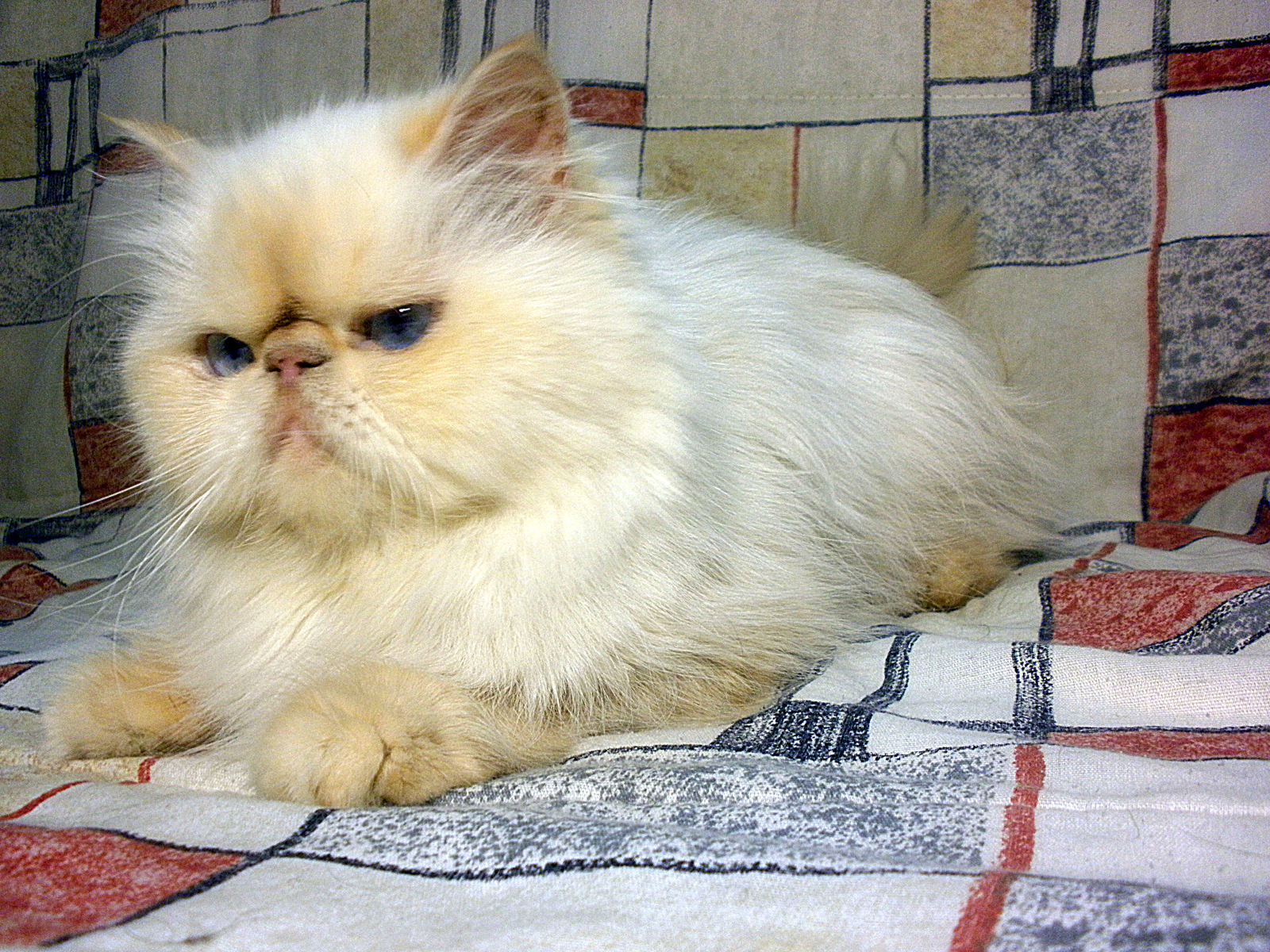
Red (flame) point

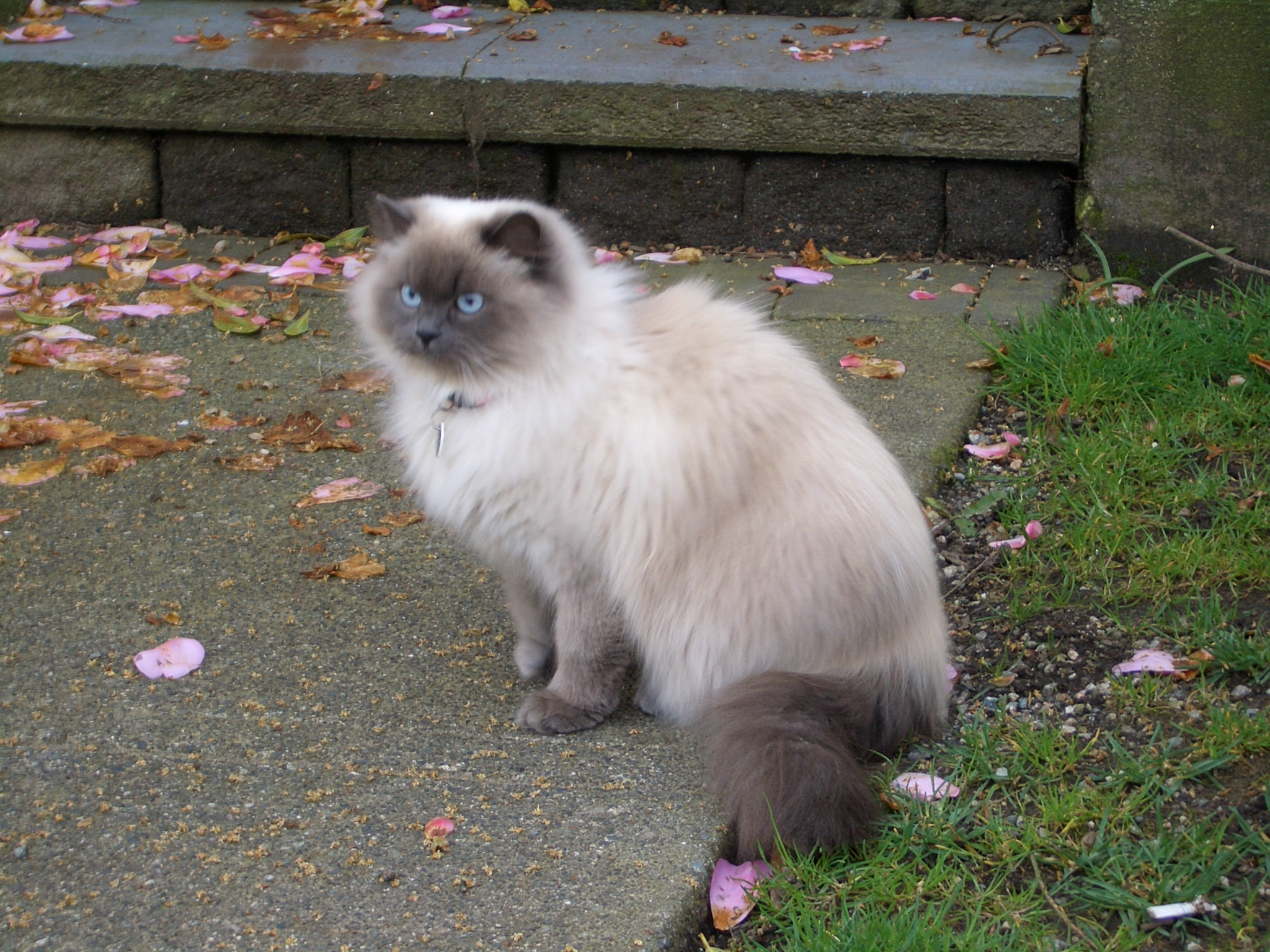
Blue-point

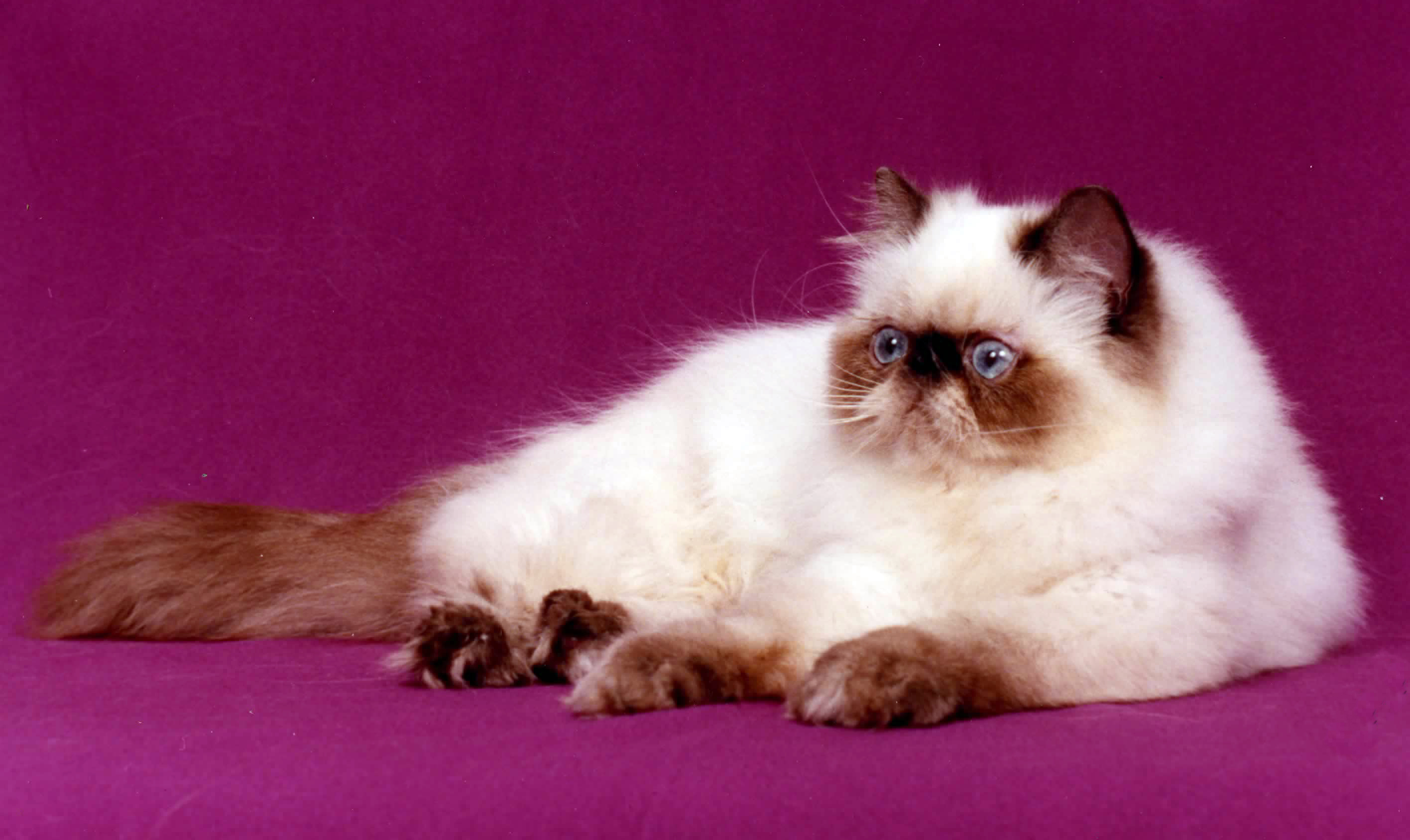
Chocolate-point

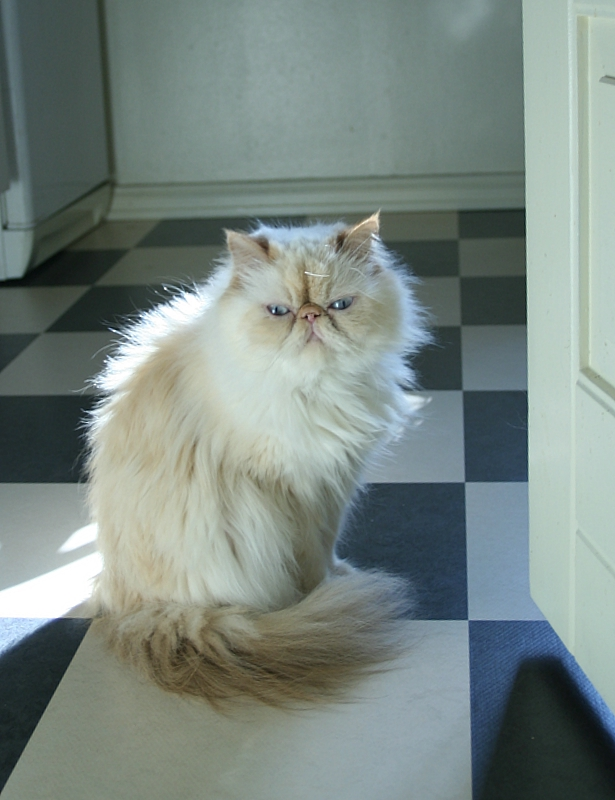
Red-point

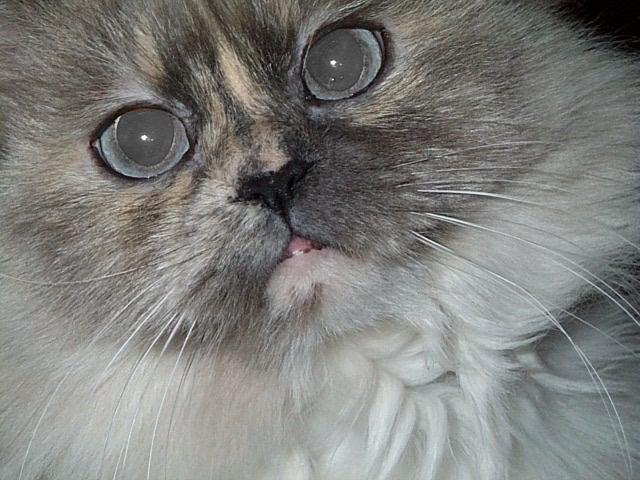
Tortie-point

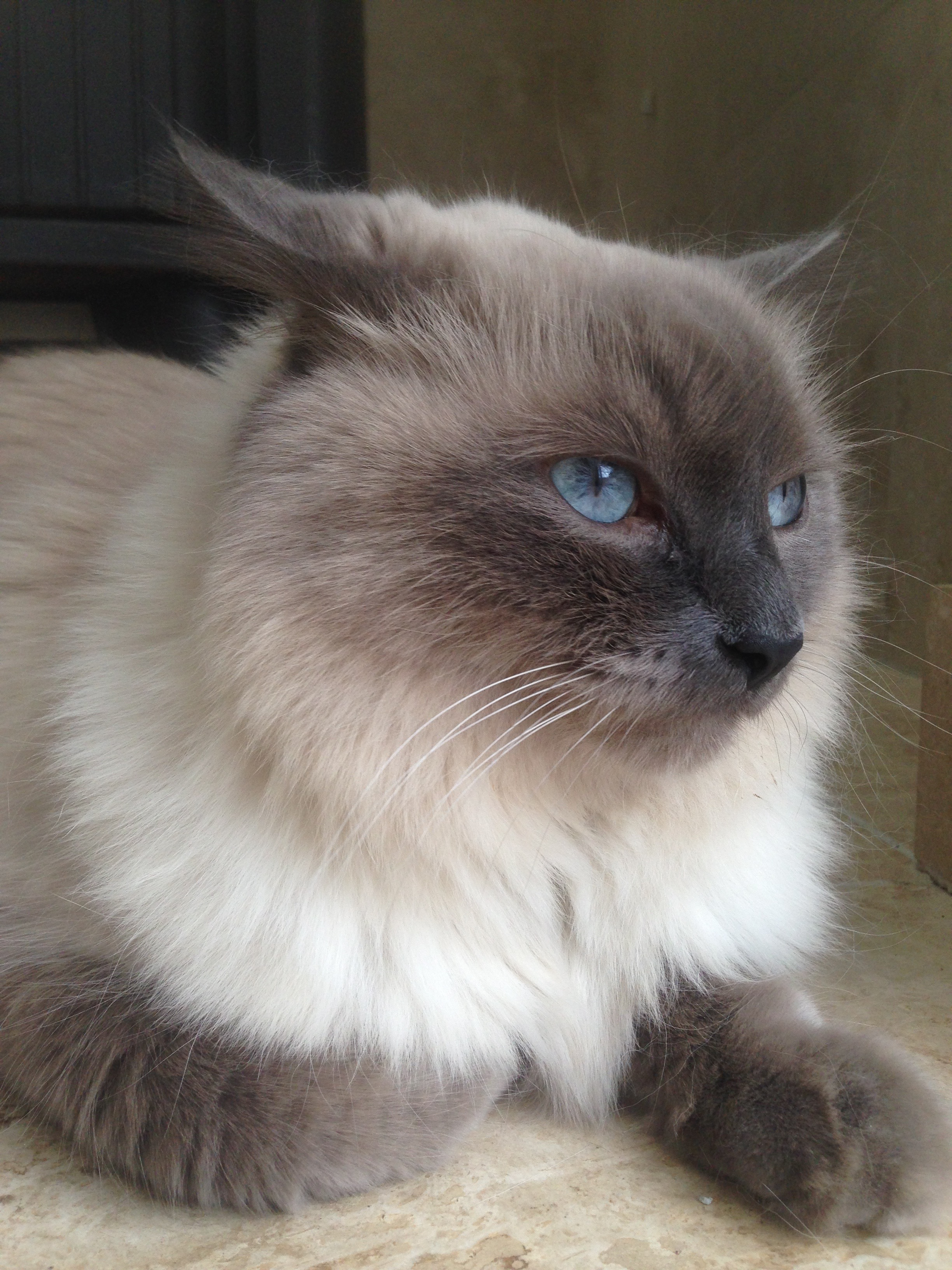
5-year-old male lilac-point

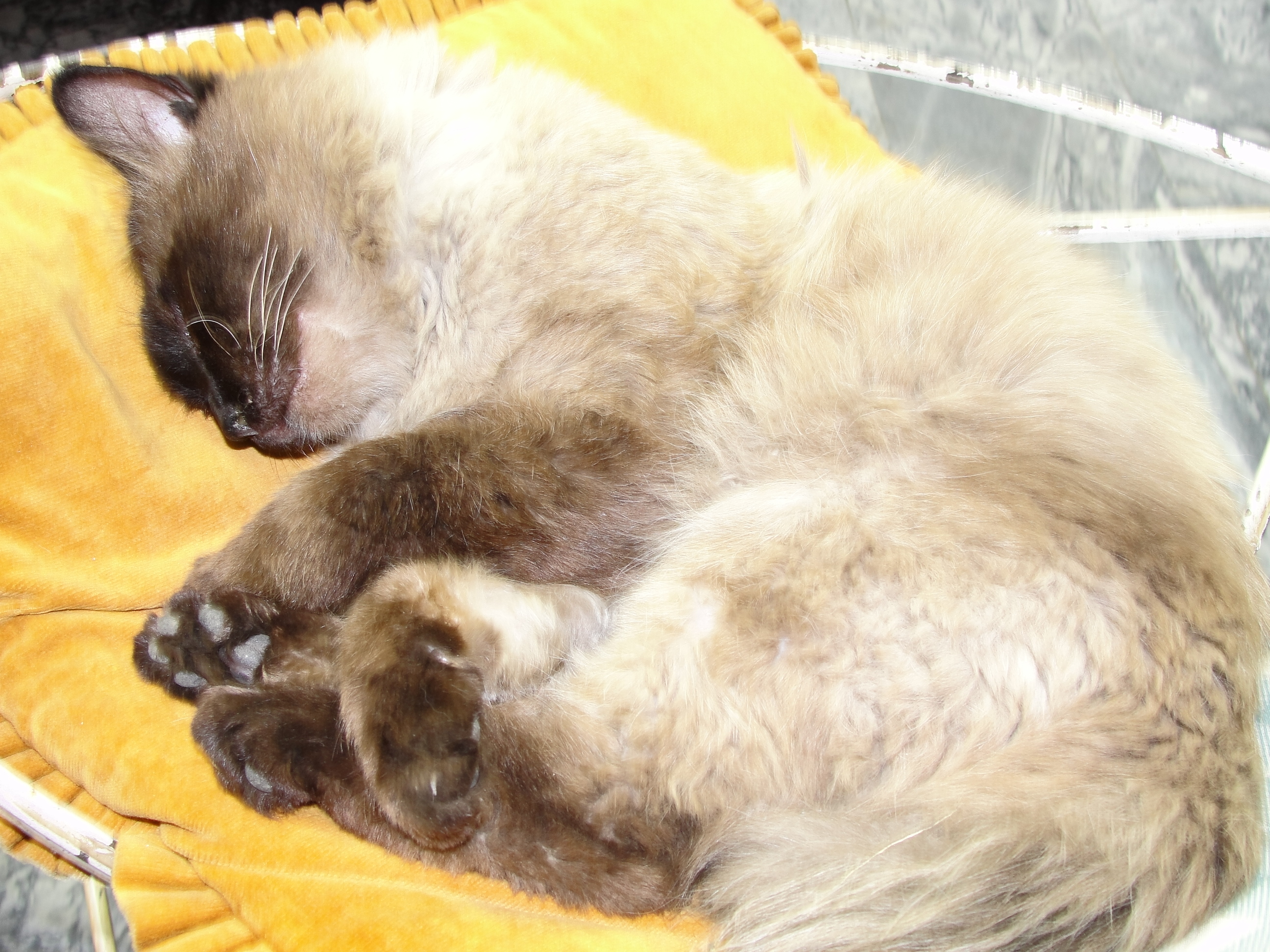
Male Himalayan cat with brown colouring (note the points inherited from siamese and relatively long hair inherited from Persian parent)

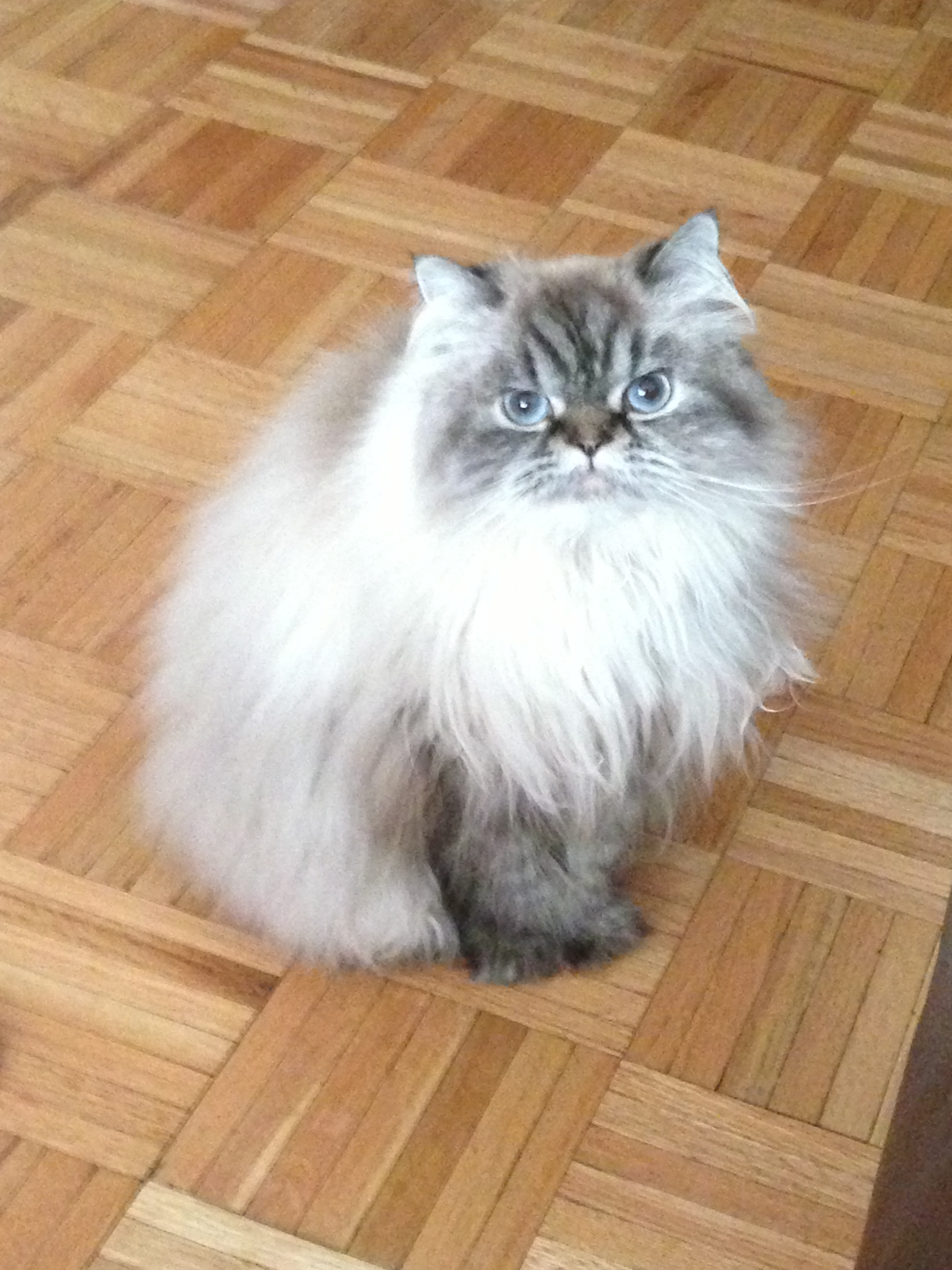
Seal lynx point Himalayan cat

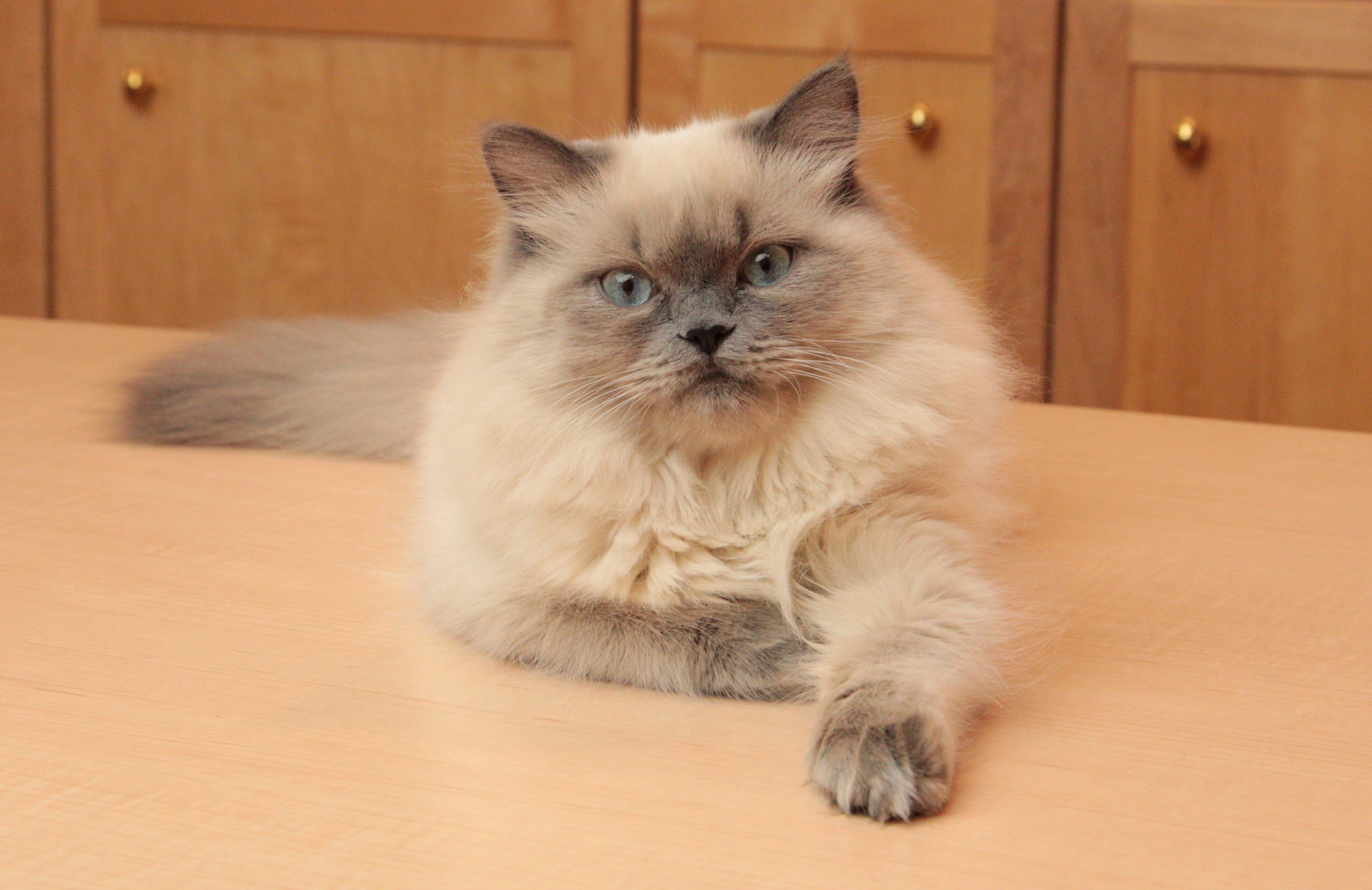
Example of blue-point feline markings on juvenile male

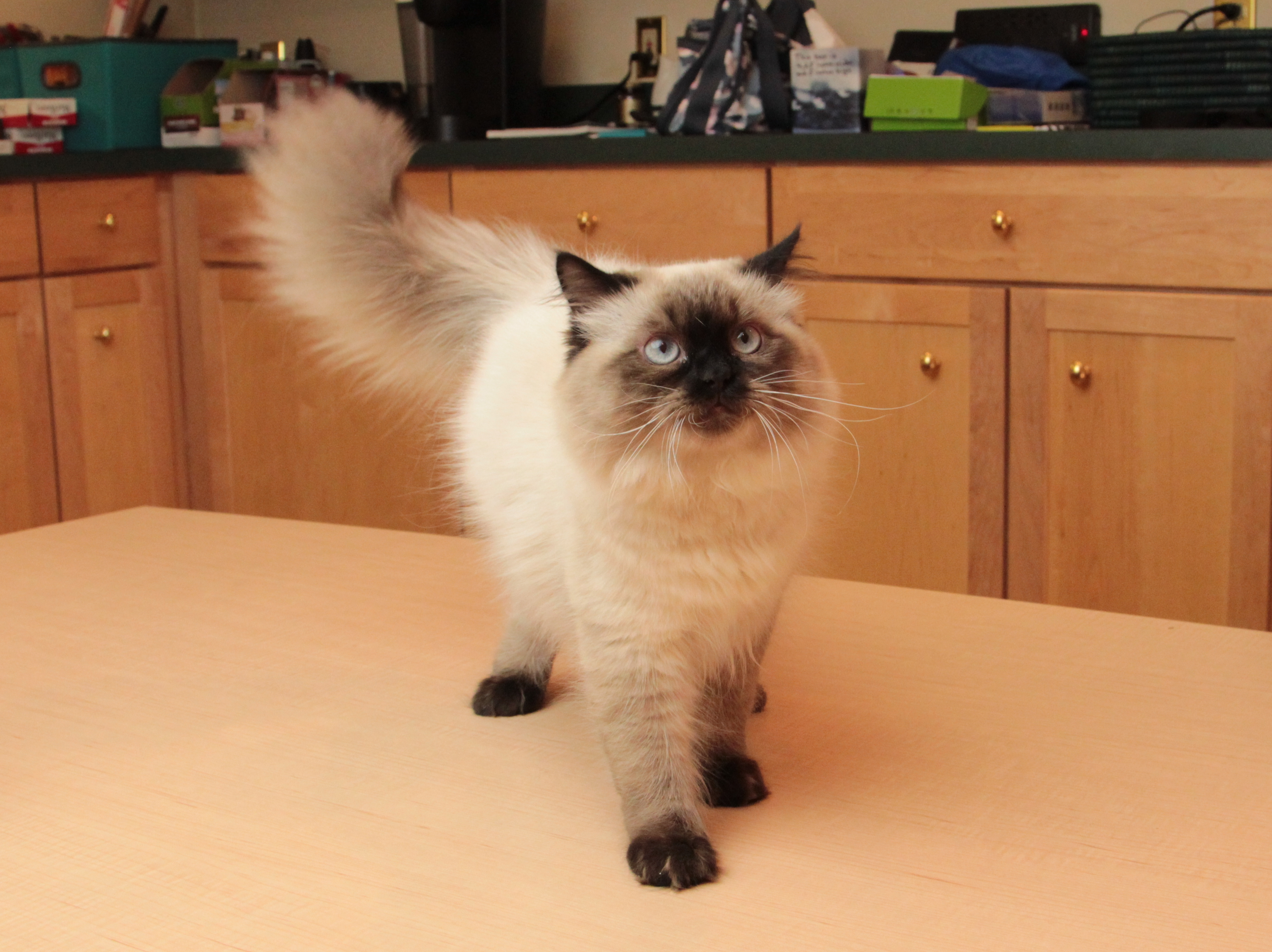
Example of seal-point feline markings on juvenile male

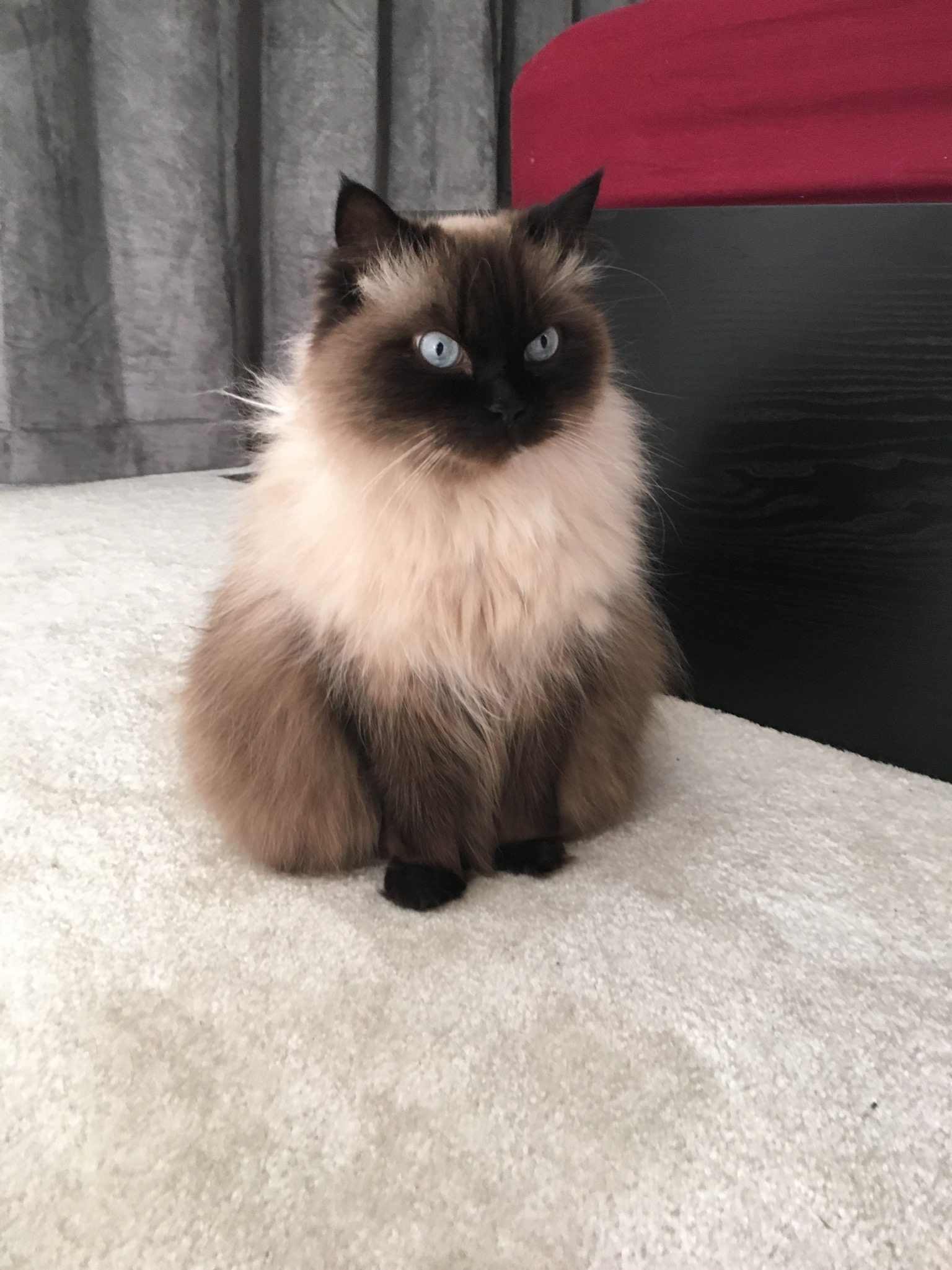
Seal-point Himalayan
