= Javanese cat =

Breed of cat

Javanese
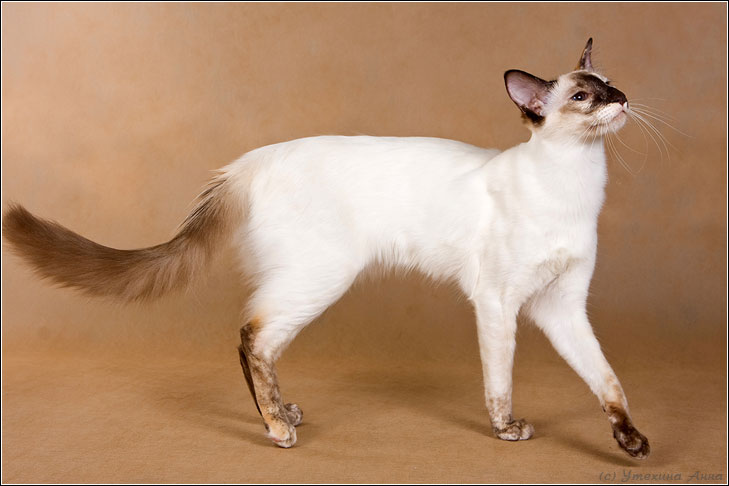
- A chocolate tortoiseshell point Javanese cat
- Other names: Colorpoint Longhair; Colourpoint Longhair; Balinese (Javanese Division); Nickname: Javi
- Origin: Canada, United States (foundation stock ultimately from Southeast Asia)

Breed standards
- CFA: standard

The Javanese, also known as the Colorpoint (or Colourpoint) Longhair in some registries (though that name has other meanings), is a variety of purebred domestic cat.

In the Cat Fanciers' Association (CFA), it is an offshoot of the Balinese breed, out-crossed to Siamese, Colorpoint Shorthair, and Balinese cats. Individuals have medium-longhair and non-traditional point coloration (lynx/tabby point, tortoiseshell point or red/cream point). The variety was developed in North America; its name is derived from the tradition of naming Oriental-type cats after Southeast Asian places.

Depending on the cat registry in question, the Javanese may be treated as a stand-alone breed, considered a Javanese division of the Balinese, or subsumed with the Himalayan into a merged breed called simply Colourpoint. In others, the cats considered non-traditional colored Balinese cats by the CFA, are also accepted as Balinese cats. Confusingly, some registries refer to what other registries refer to as the Oriental Longhair as Javanese.

== Origin ==
The term Javanese cat was coined by a Helen Smith of MerryMews Cattery circa 1950, but for a different variety she was working on. It is unknown if she had ever traveled to Indonesia. The name was derived from the tradition of using the names of the countries and islands of south-east Asia for Oriental cat breeds.

Around 1978, breeders of Balinese cats in Canada and the United States, affiliated primarily with the clubs Balinese Internationale and Balinese Breeders and Fanciers of America, sought acceptance from the US-headquartered, international Cat Fanciers' Association (CFA) of their "new colors" (variations on the traditional point-colored Balinese). The cats were accepted for registration but not competition into the CFA in 1979, but only as a new breed rather than as a division of Balinese; the name "Javanese" (independent of Helen Smith's use of it in the 1950s) was selected by looking at a map and picking Java, an island near Bali. CFA awarded "Provisional" status in 1984, and the CFA Javanese gained full "Championship" status in the organization in 1986.

The Javanese, under CFA definitions, was merged back into Balinese as the Javanese Division in 2008, to be more consistent with other registries' coat-color rules.

== Classification ==
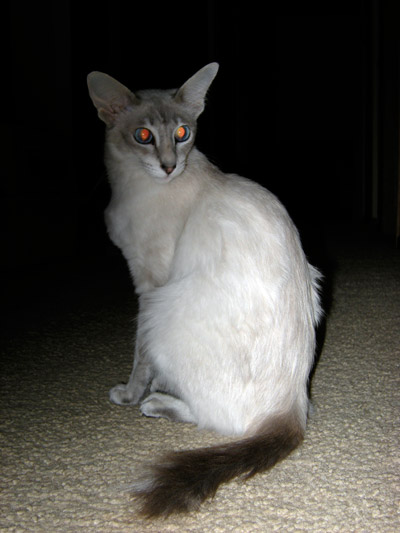
Blue lynx point Javanese cat

In the Cat Fanciers' Association, the Javanese, now a sub-breed, is a generally Balinese-ancestry cat with a coat that does not follow the traditional and strictly defined point coloration patterns of the Balinese. Only "traditional" colored seal, blue, chocolate, and lilac solid colorpoints fall under the Balinese cat in CFA, and thus referring to all lynx (tabby), tortoiseshell and other point colourations in Balinese cats as Javanese. Well into the 1990s, it was still permissible to back-cross Javanese to Balinese, Siamese, and Colorpoint Shorthairs for genetic diversity within the Javanese line. Under current CFA rules, and after intervening breed redefinitions, only "certain limited outcrossing" is allowed (by special permission from CFA), and only to the Oriental Longhair (a related breed that has the same broad color range but body-wide, lacking the colorpoint pattern). All outcrossing will stop at the end of 2025.

Such Balinese with non-traditional colors are, in some other registries, named Colorpoint Longhair, though this term is ambiguous, and can refer to different breeds in some registries. In the World Cat Federation (WCF) scheme, cats that would be classified in other registries as Javanese or Colorpoint Longhair have been merged with Himalayan into a single breed, Colourpoint. In most registries aside from the WCF, the Himalayan cat is a separate breed, a cross between the Balinese and the Persian, limited to traditional Balinese/Siamese colors. To complicate matters further, some registries have instead applied the name Javanese to what other registries call the Oriental Longhair, which has no point coloration.

== Features ==
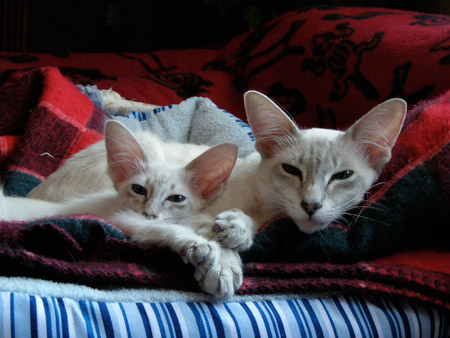
Blue lynx point Javanese adult and kitten

The Javanese breed has a long, silky coat in a variety of colors (unlike the actual native domestic cats of Java which have short hair). It is a single coat, in contrast to the double coat (with guard hairs) found in most long-haired breeds; as a result, it lies close to the skin, and produces a longer, sleeker look than is typical for long-haired cats. Like the Colorpoint Shorthair, the Javanese has point coloration (with a pale body and darker face and extremities), but is permitted to have coat colors and patterns not found in the Balinese or Siamese. These may range from dark brown to near white, and may be ruddy to bluish, tabby, lynx point, cream point, tortoiseshell (tortie), tortie point, and others, including unusual combinations ("blue-cream point", "cinnamon-tortie lynx point", etc.). In total, CFA defines 24 Javanese-division color combinations in addition to the four Balinese basics. Standard Javanese always have blue eyes.

== Behavior ==
It is noted as an intelligent cat and tends to vocalize, often for no apparent reason; this is also a trait of the Siamese ancestor. They are notably fond of play, jumping and human contact, vocalizing, and getting into whatever their owners are doing and can become depressed if not regularly entertained by humans or other pets. They are reportedly good mouse hunters.

== Genetic disorders ==
Common genetic disorders are shared with the Balinese and Siamese breeds. These include: dental issues, Amyloidosis, IBD, HCM and eye issues.

== See also ==
- Oriental Longhair
- Balinese cat
- List of cat breeds
