= 1954 =

1954 in various calendars
- Gregorian calendar: 1954; MCMLIV
- Ab urbe condita: 2707
- Armenian calendar: 1403; ԹՎ ՌՆԳ
- Assyrian calendar: 6704
- Baháʼí calendar: 110–111
- Balinese saka calendar: 1875–1876
- Bengali calendar: 1360–1361
- Berber calendar: 2904
- British Regnal year: 2 Eliz. 2 – 3 Eliz. 2
- Buddhist calendar: 2498
- Burmese calendar: 1316
- Byzantine calendar: 7462–7463
- Chinese calendar: 癸巳年 (Water Snake); 4651 or 4444 — to — 甲午年 (Wood Horse); 4652 or 4445
- Coptic calendar: 1670–1671
- Discordian calendar: 3120
- Ethiopian calendar: 1946–1947
- Hebrew calendar: 5714–5715
- Hindu calendars
- Vikram Samvat: 2010–2011
- Shaka Samvat: 1875–1876
- Kali Yuga: 5054–5055
- Holocene calendar: 11954
- Igbo calendar: 954–955
- Iranian calendar: 1332–1333
- Islamic calendar: 1373–1374
- Japanese calendar: Shōwa 29 (昭和２９年)
- Javanese calendar: 1885–1886
- Juche calendar: 43
- Julian calendar: Gregorian minus 13 days
- Korean calendar: 4287
- Minguo calendar: ROC 43 民國43年
- Nanakshahi calendar: 486
- Thai solar calendar: 2497
- Tibetan calendar: ཆུ་མོ་སྦྲུལ་ལོ་ (female Water-Snake); 2080 or 1699 or 927 — to — ཤིང་ཕོ་རྟ་ལོ་ (male Wood-Horse); 2081 or 1700 or 928

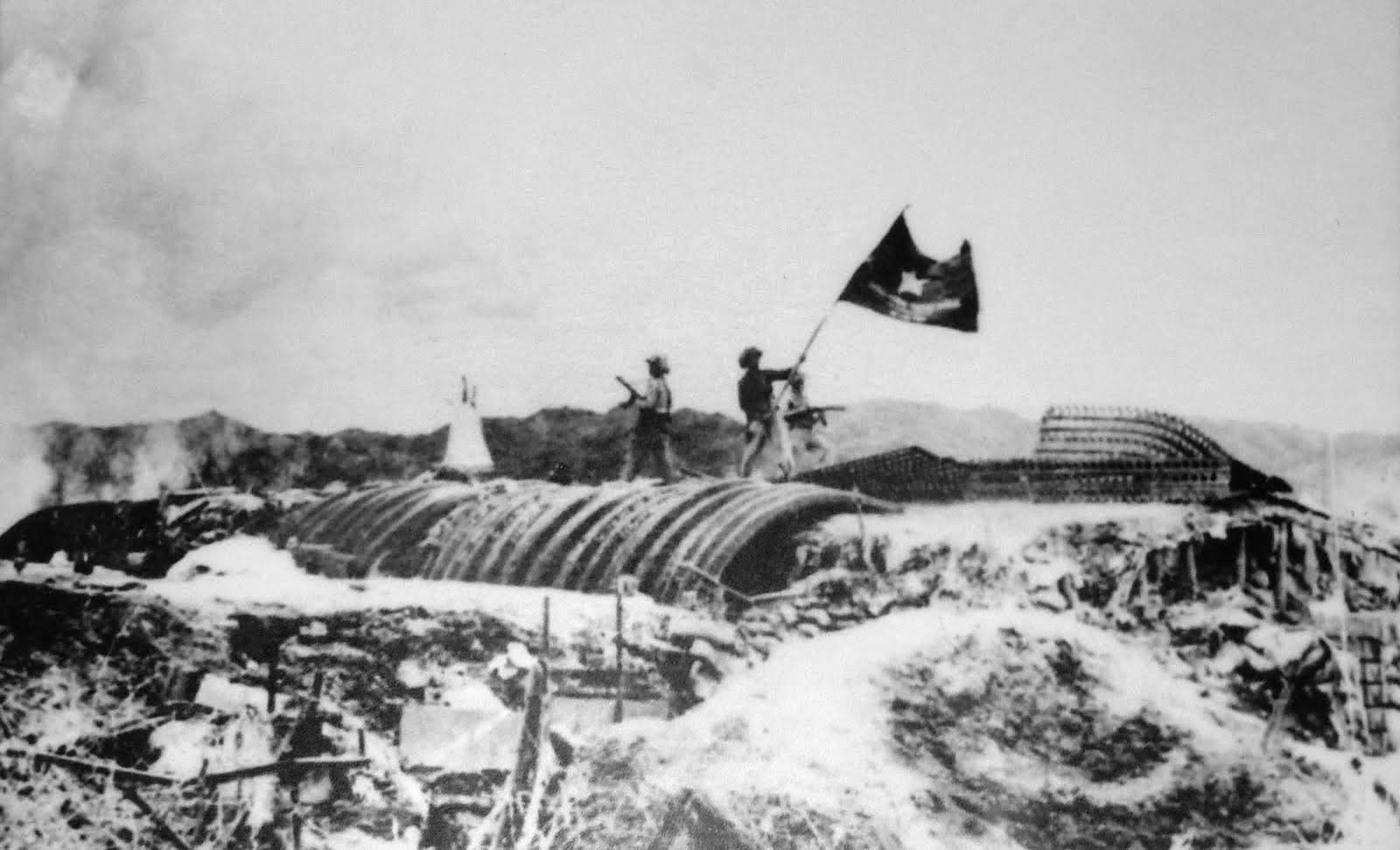
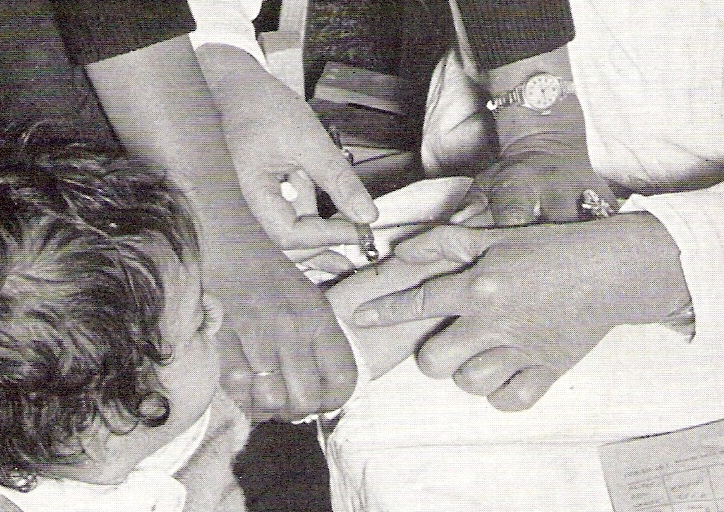
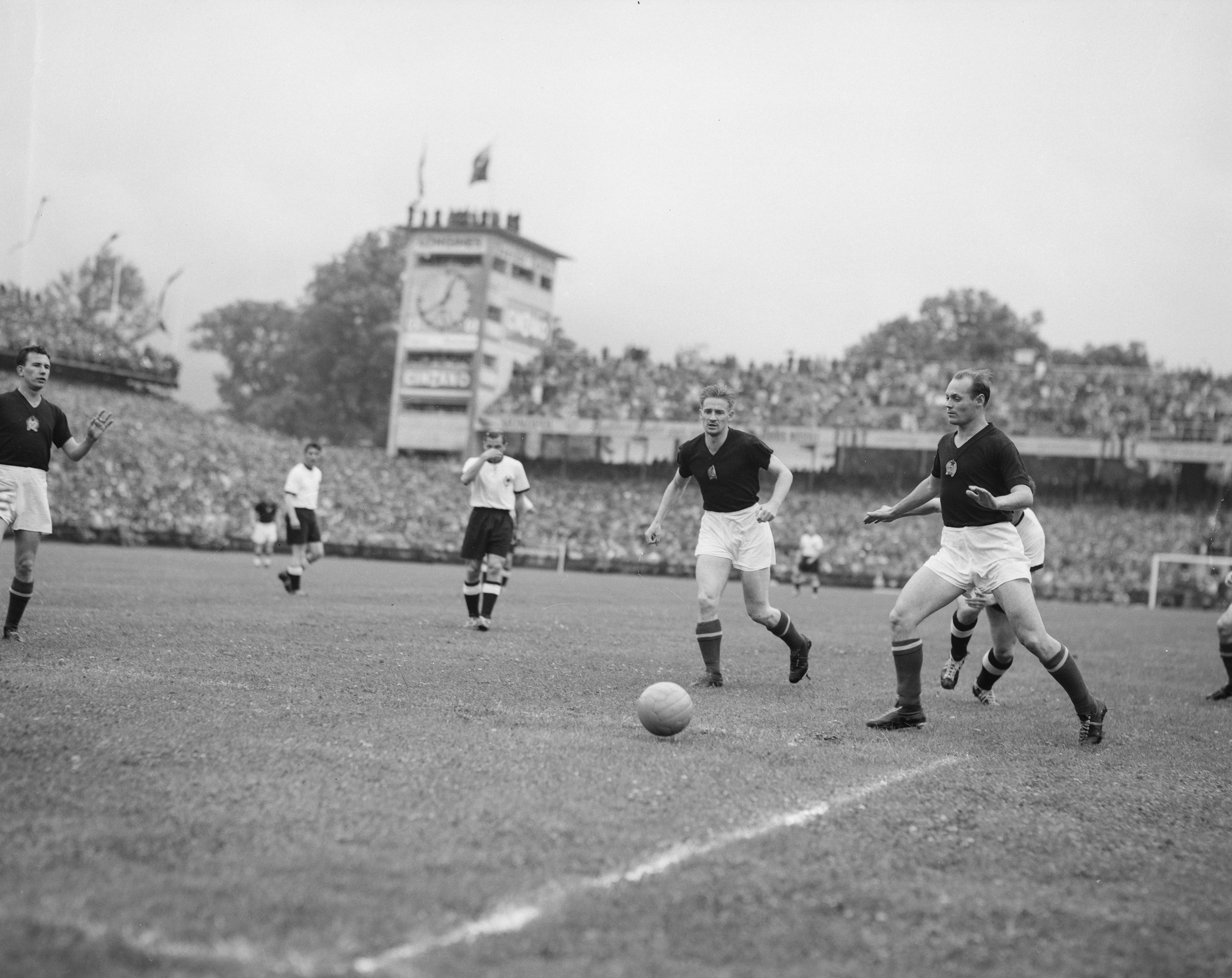
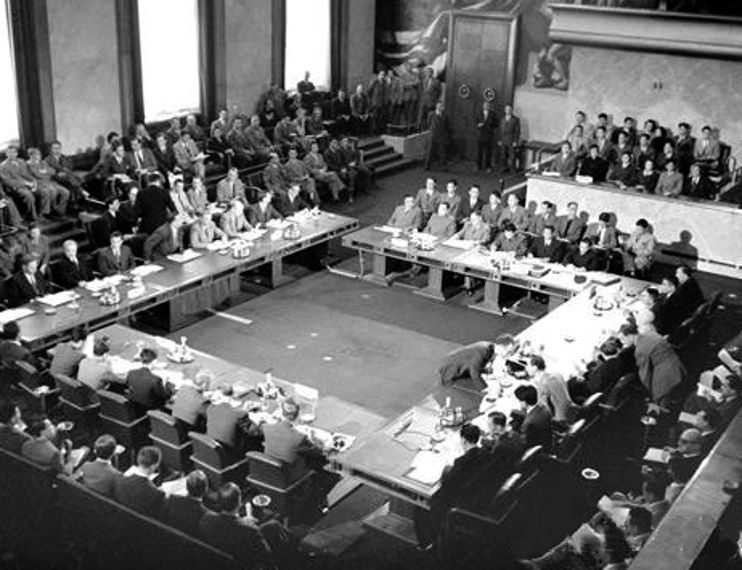
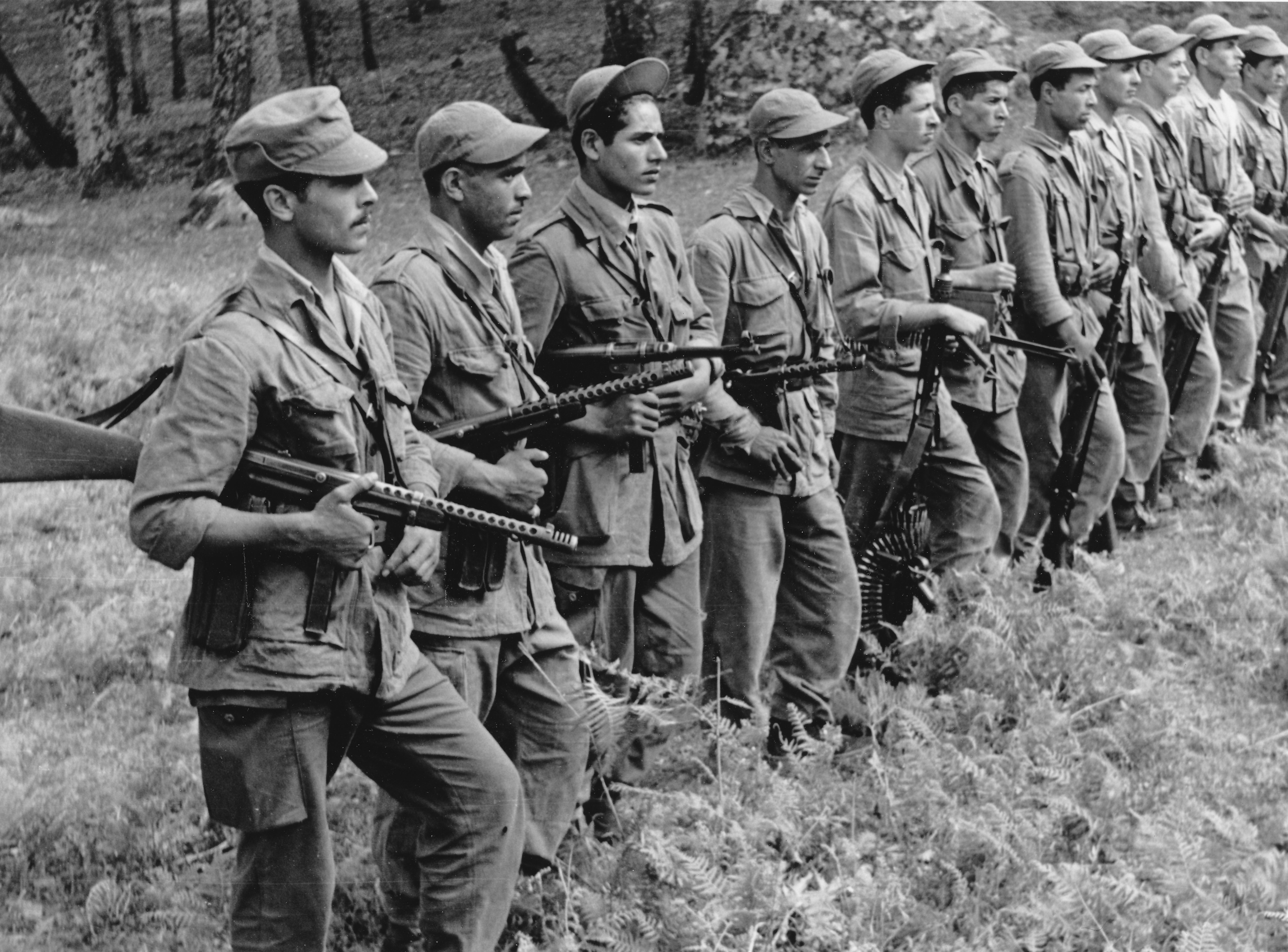
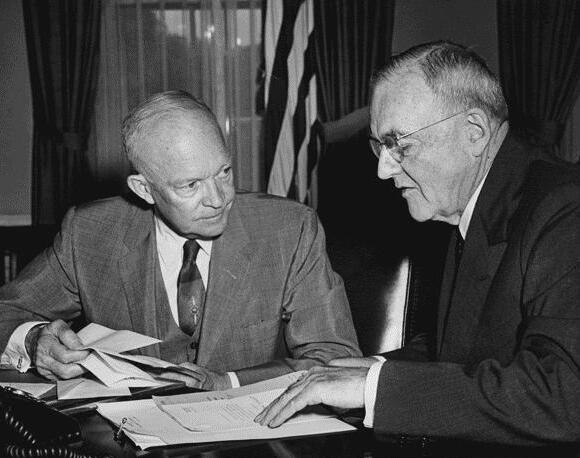
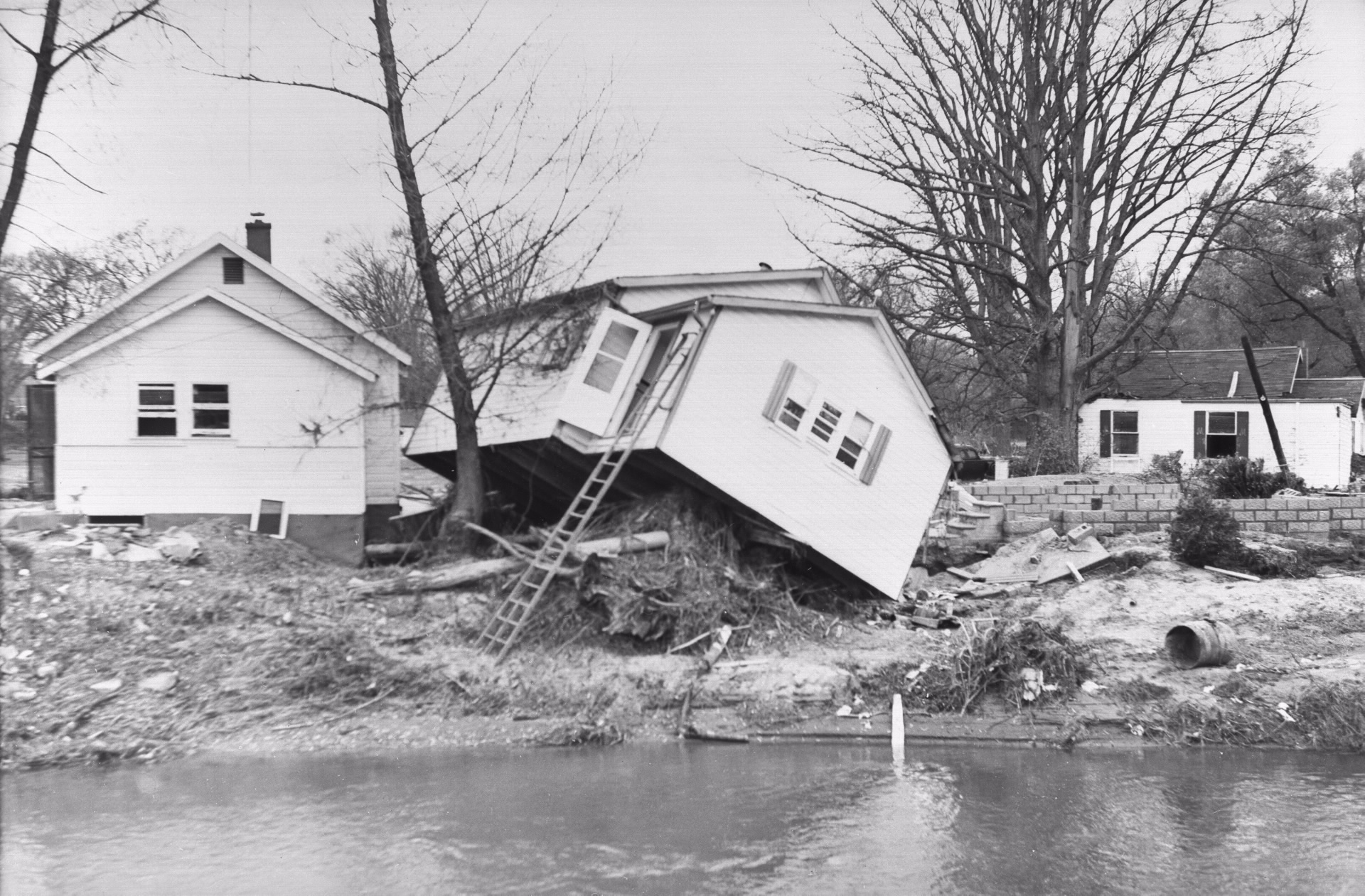
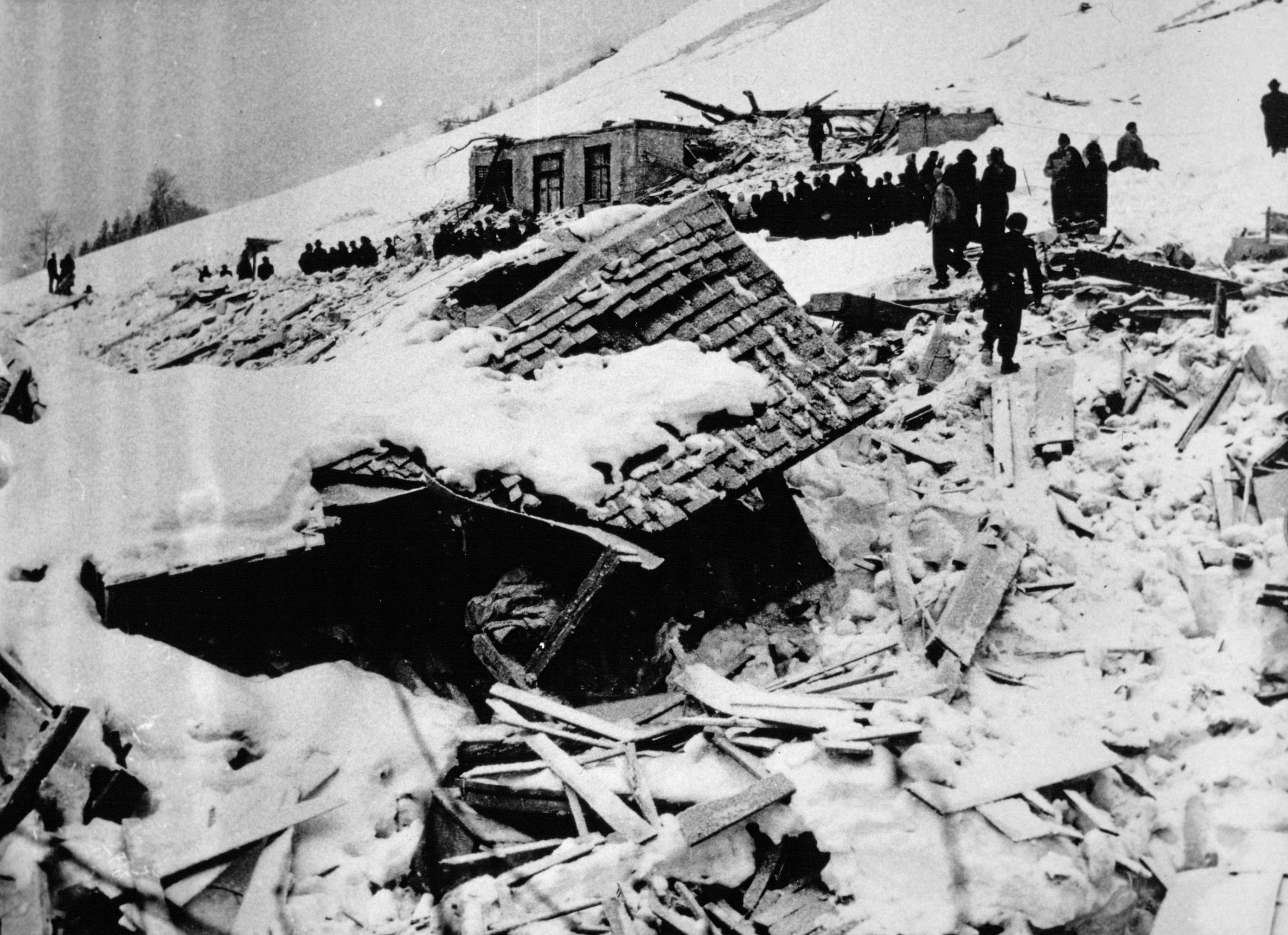
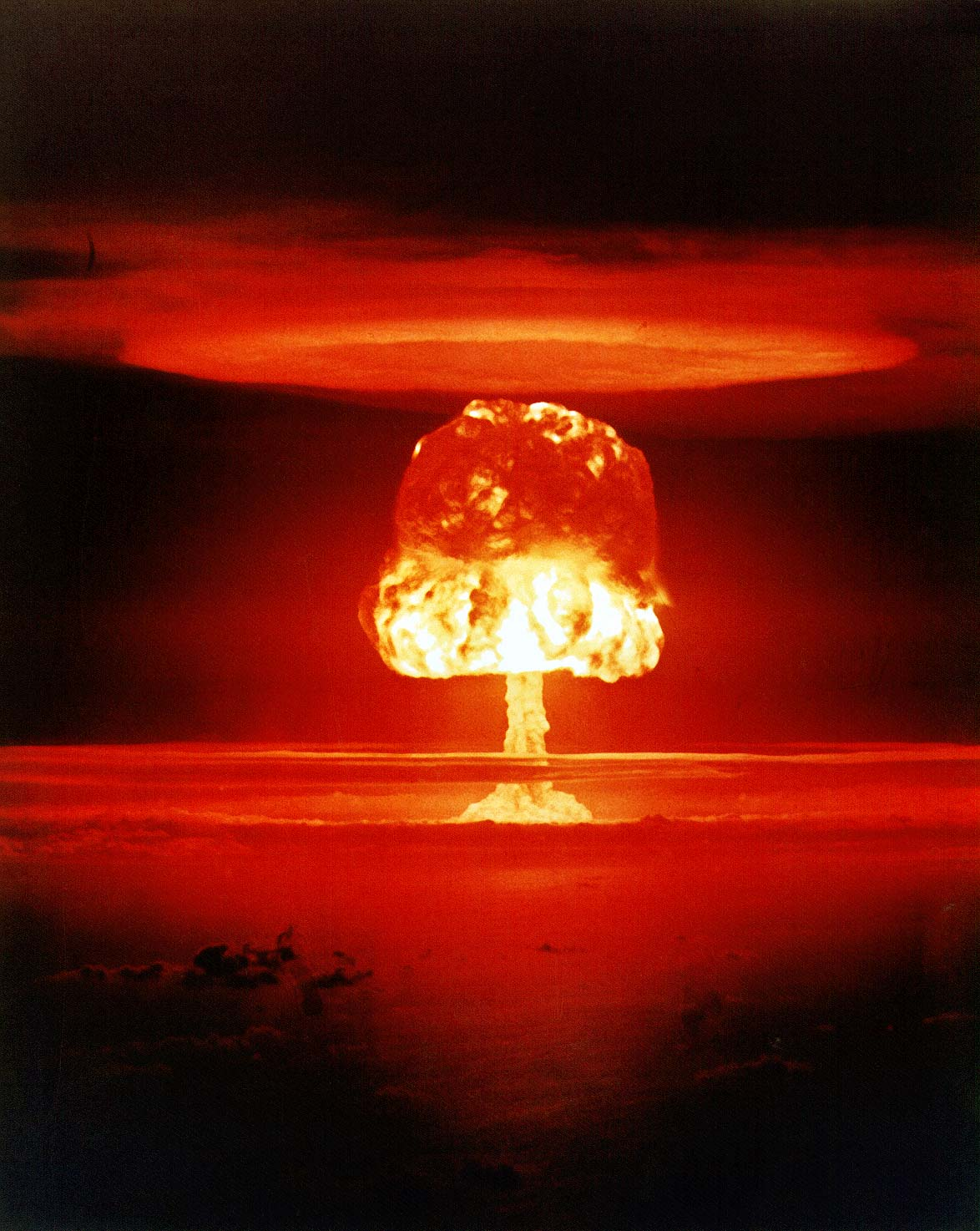
From top to bottom, left to right:
- The Battle of Dien Bien Phu ends in a decisive Vietnamese victory;
- Jonas Salk announces the polio vaccine;
- The 1954 FIFA World Cup football competition is won for the first time by West Germany;
- The Geneva Conference ends the First Indochina War, dissolves French Indochina, and divides Vietnam at the 17th parallel;
- The Algerian War begins with the Toussaint Rouge attacks;
- The 1954 Guatemalan coup d'état ousts President Jacobo Árbenz;
- Hurricane Hazel devastates the Caribbean, the U.S., and Canada;
- The 1954 Blons avalanches kill dozens in Austria;
- Castle Romeo is detonated in the Pacific.

1954 (MCMLIV) was a common year starting on Friday of the Gregorian calendar, the 1954th year of the Common Era (CE) and Anno Domini (AD) designations, the 954th year of the 2nd millennium, the 54th year of the 20th century, and the 5th year of the 1950s decade.

== Events ==
=== January ===
- January 3 – The Italian broadcaster RAI officially begins transmitting.
- January 7 – Georgetown–IBM experiment: The first public demonstration of a machine translation system is held in New York, at the head office of IBM.
- January 10 – BOAC Flight 781, a de Havilland Comet jet plane, disintegrates in mid-air due to metal fatigue, and crashes in the Mediterranean near Elba; all 35 people on board are killed.
- January 12 – Avalanches in Austria kill more than 200.
- January 15 – Mau Mau leader Waruhiu Itote is captured in Kenya.
- January 17 – In Yugoslavia, Milovan Đilas, one of the leading members of the League of Communists of Yugoslavia, is relieved of his duties.
- January 20 – The US-based National Negro Network is established, with 46 member radio stations.
- January 21 – The first nuclear-powered submarine, the USS Nautilus, is launched in Groton, Connecticut, by First Lady of the United States Mamie Eisenhower.
- January 25 – The foreign ministers of the United States, Britain, France and the Soviet Union meet at the Berlin Conference.

=== February ===
- February 10 – After authorizing $385 million over the $400 million already budgeted for military aid to Vietnam, President of the United States Dwight D. Eisenhower warns against his country's intervention in Vietnam.
- February 19 – 1954 transfer of Crimea: The Soviet Politburo of the Soviet Union orders the transfer of the Crimean Oblast from the Russian SFSR to the Ukrainian SSR.
- February 23 – The first mass vaccination of children against polio begins in Pittsburgh, Pennsylvania, United States.
- February 25 – Lt. Col. Gamal Abdel Nasser becomes premier of Egypt.

=== March ===
- March 1
  - U.S. officials announce that a hydrogen bomb test (Castle Bravo) has been conducted, on Bikini Atoll in the Pacific Ocean. The explosion produces a yield of 15 megatons TNT instead of the predicted 5 MT; the Japanese fishing vessel Daigo Fukuryū Maru is caught up inside the fallout zone, some 80 miles from the explosion with several of her crew members suffering from radiation sickness as a consequence.
  - U.S. Capitol shooting incident: Four Puerto Rican nationalists open fire in the United States House of Representatives chamber and wound 5; they are apprehended by security guards.
- March 9 – American journalists Edward R. Murrow and Fred W. Friendly produce a 30-minute See It Now documentary, entitled A Report on Senator Joseph McCarthy.
- March 12 – Finland and Germany officially end their state of war.
- March 13 – Việt Minh forces under General Võ Nguyên Giáp began a massive artillery bombardment on the French military, beginning the Battle of Dien Bien Phu, the climactic battle of the First Indochina War.
- March 19 – Joey Giardello knocks out Willie Tory at Madison Square Garden in the first televised boxing prize fight to be shown in colour.
- March 23 – In Vietnam, the Viet Minh capture the main airstrip of Dien Bien Phu. The remaining French Army units there are partially isolated.
- March 25
  - The 26th Academy Awards Ceremony is held.
  - The Soviet Union recognises the sovereignty of East Germany. Soviet troops remain in the country.
- March 27 – The Castle Romeo nuclear test explosion is executed at Bikini Atoll, in the Marshall Islands.
- March 28
  - The trial of A. L. Zissu and 12 other Zionist leaders ends with harsh sentences in Communist Romania.
  - Puerto Rico's first television station, WKAQ-TV, commences broadcasting.
- March 29 – A C-47 transport with French nurse Geneviève de Galard on board is wrecked on the runway at Dien Bien Phu.
- March 30 – The first operational subway line in Canada opens in Toronto.

=== April ===
- April 1
  - The U.S. Congress and President Dwight D. Eisenhower authorize the founding of the United States Air Force Academy in Colorado.
  - South Point School in India is founded, and becomes the largest school in the world by 1992.
- April 3 – Petrov Affair: Diplomat Vladimir Petrov defects from the Soviet Union and asks for political asylum in Australia.
- April 4 – Legendary symphony conductor Arturo Toscanini experiences a lapse of memory during a concert broadcast live from Carnegie Hall in New York City. At this concert's end, his retirement is announced, and he never conducts in public again.
- April 7 – Dwight D. Eisenhower gives his "domino theory" speech, during a news conference.
- April 8 – A Royal Canadian Air Force Canadair Harvard collides with a Trans-Canada Air Lines Canadair North Star over Moose Jaw, Saskatchewan, killing 37 people.
- April 10 – The modern form of value-added tax is first implemented by Maurice Lauré, joint director of the French tax authority, in France's Ivory Coast colony.
- April 11
  - This day is denoted as the most boring day in the 20th century by True Knowledge, an answer engine developed by William Tunstall-Pedoe. No significant newsworthy events, births, or deaths are known to have happened on this day.
  - In a general election in Belgium, the dominant Christian Social Party wins 95 of the 212 seats in the Chamber of Representatives, and 49 of the 106 seats in the Senate. The government led by Jean Van Houtte loses their majority in parliament. The two other main parties, the Socialist and Liberal Party, subsequently form a rare "purple" government, with Achille Van Acker as Prime Minister.
- April 12 – Bill Haley & His Comets record "Rock Around the Clock" in their first session for American Decca in New York City; it is released on May 20 as a B-side, but only in 1955 becomes a #1 hit, helping to initiate the rock and roll craze.
- April 14
  - Aneurin Bevan resigns from the British Labour Party's Shadow Cabinet in protest over his party's failure to oppose the rearmament of West Germany.
  - A Soviet spy ring in Australia is unveiled.
- April 16 – Vice President Richard Nixon announces that the United States may be "putting our own boys in Indochina regardless of Allied support".
- April 22
  - The 1951 United Nations Convention Relating to the Status of Refugees comes into force, defining the status of refugees and setting out the basis for granting right of asylum.
  - Senator Joseph McCarthy begins hearings investigating the United States Army for being "soft" on Communism.
- April 26
  - An international conference on Korea and Indo-China opens in Geneva.
  - Akira Kurosawa's Seven Samurai is released in Japan.
- April 28 – U.S. Secretary of State John Foster Dulles accuses Communist China of sending combat troops to Indo-China to train Viet Minh guerrillas.

=== May ===
- May 1 – The Unification Church is founded in South Korea.
- May 4 – General Alfredo Stroessner deposes Federico Chaves in a coup d'état in Paraguay; from August 15 he will hold the office of President until 1989.
- May 6 – Roger Bannister runs the first sub-four minute mile, in Oxford, England.
- May 7 – First Indochina War: The Battle of Dien Bien Phu ends in a French defeat (the battle began on March 13).
- May 8 – The Asian Football Confederation (AFC) is formed in Manila, Philippines.
- May 11 – U.S. Secretary of State John Foster Dulles declares that Indochina is important but not essential to the security of Southeast Asia, thus ending any prospect of American intervention on the side of France.
- May 14
  - The Boeing 367-80, prototype for the later Boeing 707 jetliner, is rolled out in the United States, after about 2 years of development.
  - The Hague Convention for the Protection of Cultural Property in the Event of Armed Conflict is adopted in The Hague, Netherlands.
- May 15 – The Latin Union (Unión Latina) is created by the Convention of Madrid. Its member countries use the five Romance languages: Italian, French, Spanish, Portuguese, and Romanian. It suspended operations in 2012.
- May 16 – Beginning of the Kengir uprising in the Gulag.
- May 17
  - Brown v. Board of Education (347 US 483 1954): The Supreme Court of the United States rules unanimously that segregated schools are unconstitutional.
  - The Royal Commission on the Petrov Affair in Australia begins its inquiry.
  - Adnan Menderes of the Democrat Party forms the new (21st) government of Turkey.
- May 20 – Chiang Kai-shek is re-elected as the president of the Republic of China, by the National Assembly.
- May 22 – The common Nordic Labour Market act is signed.
- May 26 – A fire on board the U.S. Navy aircraft carrier USS Bennington, off Narragansett Bay, Massachusetts, kills 103 sailors.
- May 29
  - 1954 Australian federal election: Robert Menzies' Liberal/Country Coalition Government is re-elected with a decreased majority, defeating the Labor Party led by H.V. Evatt. The election has come shortly after the Petrov Affair, arguably helping the Government survive what was initially predicted to be a defeat.
  - Creation and first meeting of the Bilderberg Group.
  - Diane Leather becomes the first woman to run a sub-five minute mile, in Birmingham, England.

=== June ===
- June 6 – The grand opening of the sculpture of Yuriy Dolgorukiy takes place in Moscow (this statue is one of the main monuments of Moscow).
- June 7 – English cryptanalyst, mathematician and computer scientist Alan Turing, age 41, commits suicide by cyanide poisoning.
- June 9 – McCarthyism: Joseph N. Welch, special counsel for the United States Army, lashes out at Senator Joseph McCarthy, during hearings on whether Communism has infiltrated the Army, saying, "Have you, at long last, no decency?" The exchange results in the decline of McCarthy's popularity.
- June 15 – The UEFA (Union of European Football Associations) is formed in Basel, Switzerland.
- June 17 – A CIA-engineered military coup occurs in Guatemala.
- June 18 – Pierre Mendès France becomes prime minister of France.
- June 27
  - Guatemalan President Jacobo Árbenz steps down in a CIA-sponsored military coup, triggering a bloody civil war that continues for more than 35 years.
  - The world's first atomic power station opens at Obninsk, near Moscow.

=== July ===
- July 1
  - The Common Nordic Labor Market Act comes into effect.
  - The United States officially begins using the international unit of the nautical mile, equal to 6,076.11549 ft. or 1,852 meters.
- July 4
  - Food rationing in Great Britain ends, with the lifting of restrictions on sale and purchase of meat, 14 years after it began early in World War II, and nearly a decade after the war's end.
  - "Miracle of Bern": West Germany beats Hungary 3–2 to win the 1954 FIFA World Cup.
- July 10 – Peter Thomson becomes the first Australian to win the British Open Golf Championship.
- July 15
  - The Boeing 367-80 (or Dash 80), prototype of the Boeing 707 series, makes its maiden flight.
  - Juan Fangio, Argentine driver for German Grand Prix team Mercedes-Benz, makes a new fastest lap of the Silverstone Circuit in England, with an average speed of 100.35 mph, the previous record being 100.16 mph.
- July 17 – First Indochina War: Viet Minh troops successfully ambush the armoured French column 'G.M. 42' in the Battle of Chu Dreh Pass in the Central Highlands. It is the last battle of the war.
- July 19 – Release of Elvis Presley's first single, a cover of "That's All Right", by Sun Records (recorded July 5 in Memphis, Tennessee).
- July 21 – First Indochina War: The Geneva Conference sends French forces to the south, and Vietnamese forces to the north, of a demarcation line. The agreement leads to the establishment of the North Vietnam regime and the state of South Vietnam.
- July 29 – The construction of Yad Vashem started in Jerusalem. It is an official memorial center to commemorate the victims of the persecution of the Jews by the Nazis and their accomplices in Europe.
- July 29 – The Fellowship of the Ring, the first of three volumes in J.R.R. Tolkien's epic fantasy novel, The Lord of the Rings, is published in London.
- July 31 – 1954 Italian expedition to K2: Italian mountaineers Lino Lacedelli and Achille Compagnoni become the first to reach the summit of the second highest mountain in the world, in the Karakoram range.

=== August ===
- August 1 – The First Indochina War ends with the Vietnam People's Army in North Vietnam, the Vietnamese National Army in South Vietnam, the Kingdom of Cambodia in Cambodia, and the Kingdom of Laos in Laos, emerging victorious against the French Army.
- August 6 – Emilie Dionne, one of the Dionne quintuplets, dies of asphyxiation following an epileptic seizure. She is the first of the Canadian five to perish; three live into the 21st century.
- August 16 – The first issue of Sports Illustrated magazine is published in the United States.
- August 23 – A United States Air Force Lockheed C-130 Hercules makes its first flight at Burbank, California, manufactured by Lockheed Martin.
- August 24 – Brazilian president Getúlio Vargas commits suicide, after being accused of involvement in a conspiracy to murder his chief political opponent, Carlos Lacerda.

=== September ===
- September 5 - KLM flight 633, a Lockheed L-1049C Super Constellation named “Triton”, attempted to ditch into the river Shannon immediately after takeoff from Shannon Airport, Ireland. 28 of the 56 passengers and crew were killed
- September 6 – The Southeast Asia Treaty Organization (SEATO) treaty is signed in Manila, Philippines.
- September 8 – SEATO is established in Bangkok, Thailand.
- September 9 – The 6.7 M_{w} Chlef earthquake shakes northern Algeria, with a maximum Mercalli intensity of XI (Extreme). The shock destroys Orléansville, leaving 1,243–1,409 dead, and 5,000 injured.
- September 14 – The Soviet Union carries out the Totskoye nuclear exercise.
- September 18 – Finnish president J. K. Paasikivi is the first Western head of state to be awarded the highest honor of the Soviet Union, the Order of Lenin.
- September 20 – The first Moomins comic strip is published in the London newspaper The Evening News.
- September 24 – The Cochabamba–Santa Cruz highway connecting western and eastern Bolivia is inaugurated.
- September 26 – Japanese ferry Tōya Maru sinks during a typhoon in the Tsugaru Strait. More than 1,100 people are killed, 7 other ships are wrecked, and at least nine others seriously damaged.
- September 30 – The USS Nautilus (SSN-571), the first nuclear-powered submarine in the world, is commissioned into the United States Navy.

=== October ===
- October 11
  - Pre-Vietnam War: The Viet Minh takes control of North Vietnam.
  - Hurricane Hazel crosses over Haiti, killing 1,000.
- October 15 – Hurricane Hazel makes U.S. landfall; it is the only recorded Category 4 hurricane to strike as far north as North Carolina
- October 18 – Texas Instruments announces the development of the first commercial transistor radio. The Regency TR-1 goes on sale the following month.
- October 23
  - Paris Agreement sets up the Western European Union to implement the Treaty of Brussels (1948), providing for mutual self-defence and other collaboration between Belgium, France, West Germany, Italy, Luxembourg, the Netherlands and the United Kingdom. Germany is granted admission to the NATO which becomes effective in 1955.
- October 25 – Landslides caused by heavy rains hit Salerno, Italy, killing about 300.
- October 26 – Muslim Brotherhood member Mahmoud Abdul Latif tries to kill Gamal Abdel Nasser.
- October 31 – Algerian War of Independence: The Algerian National Liberation Front begins a revolt against French rule.

=== November ===
- November 1 – The FLN attacks representative and public buildings of the French colonial power.
- November 5 – Japan and Burma sign a peace treaty in Rangoon, to end their long-extinct state of war.
- November 10 – U.S. President Dwight D. Eisenhower dedicates the USMC War Memorial (Iwo Jima Memorial), at the Arlington National Cemetery.
- November 12 – The main immigration port-of-entry in New York Harbor at Ellis Island closes permanently.
- November 13 – Great Britain defeats France, to capture the first ever Rugby League World Cup in Paris in front of around 30,000 spectators
- November 14 – Egyptian president Muhammad Naguib is deposed, and Gamal Abdel Nasser replaces him.
- November 21 – People's Action Party, an eventual dominative political party in Singapore, was established.
- November 22 – Berman v. Parker (348 U.S. 26): The U.S. Supreme Court upholds the federal slum clearance and urban renewal programs.
- November 23 – The Dow Jones Industrial Average rises 3.27 points, or 0.86 percent, closing at an all-time high of 382.74. More significantly, this is the first time the Dow has surpassed its peak level, reached just before the Wall Street Crash of 1929.
- November 30 – In Sylacauga, Alabama, United States, a four-kilogram piece of the Hodges Meteorite crashes through the roof of a house and badly bruises a napping woman, in the first documented case of an object from outer space hitting a person.

=== December ===
- December 2
  - Red Scare: The United States Senate votes 67–22 to censure Wisconsin Senator Joseph McCarthy, for "conduct that tends to bring the Senate into dishonor and disrepute."
  - The Taiwan-United States Mutual Defense Treaty is signed.
- December 3
  - A German court dismisses charges against Werner Naumann, head of the Neo-Nazi Naumann Circle.
  - Väinö Linna's war novel The Unknown Soldier (Tuntematon sotilas) is published.
- December 15 – The Netherlands Antilles is created out of the Dutch Caribbean nations. It is dissolved between 1986 and 2010.
- December 23 – J. Hartwell Harrison and Joseph Murray perform the world's first successful kidney transplantation, in Boston, Massachusetts, United States.
- December 24 – Laos gains full independence from France.

=== Date unknown ===
- New Zealand engineer Sir William Hamilton develops the first pump-jet engine (the "Hamilton Jet") capable of propelling a jetboat.
- The first electric drip brew coffeemaker is patented in Germany and named the Wigomat after its inventor Gottlob Widmann.
- Gerbils (Meriones unguiculatus) are brought to the United States by Dr. Victor Schwentker.
- The case of Lothar Malskat, who had admitted that he had painted the supposedly antique frescoes in Marienkirche himself, goes to trial.
- In South Vietnam, the Viet Minh is reorganised into the Viet Cong.
- After the death of Joseph Stalin, the Soviet Union starts releasing political prisoners and deportees from its Gulag prison camps.

== Births ==
=== January ===
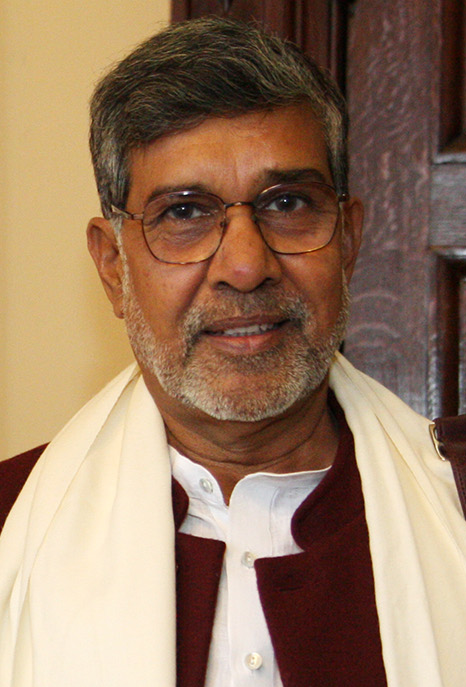
Kailash Satyarthi

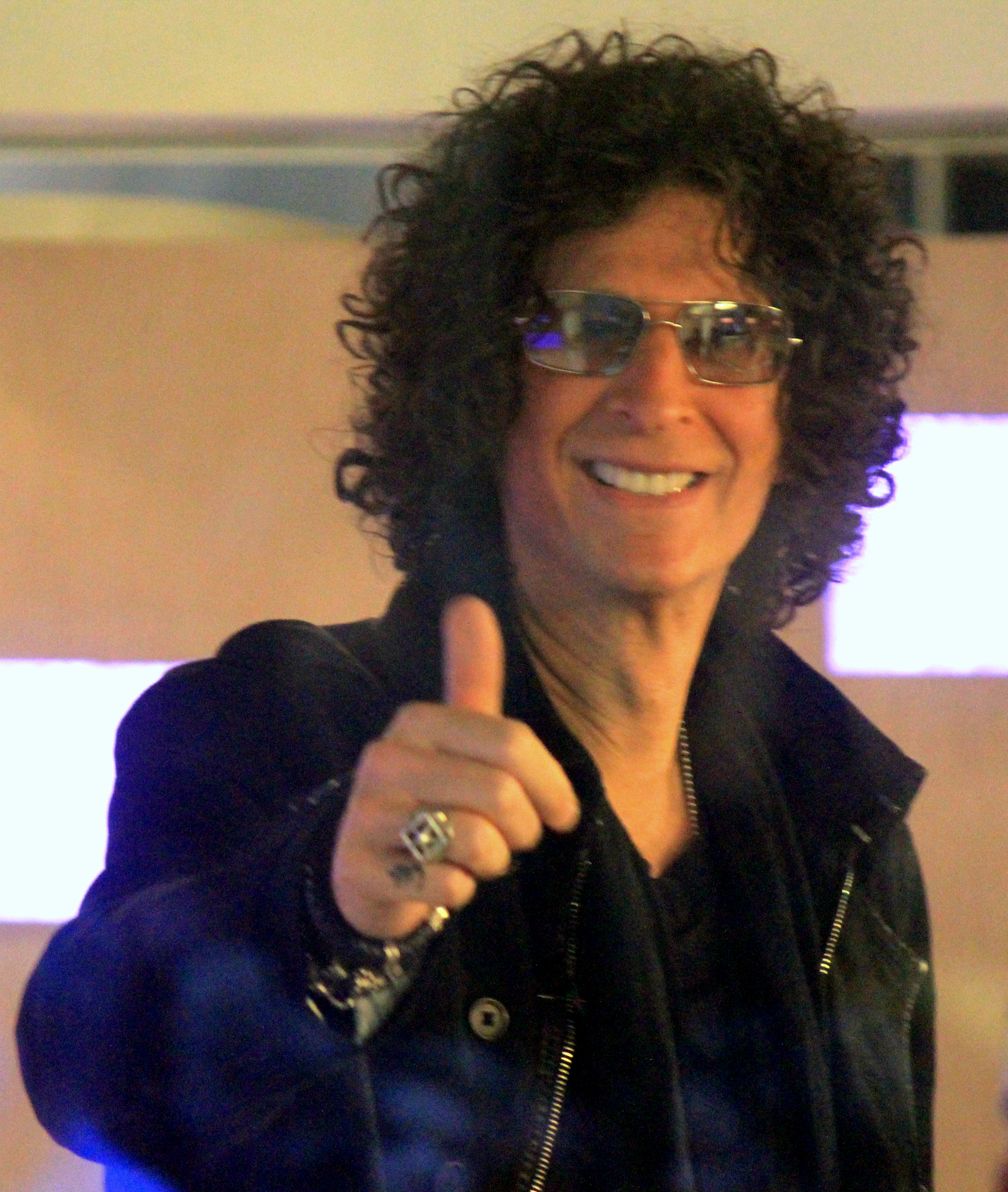
Howard Stern

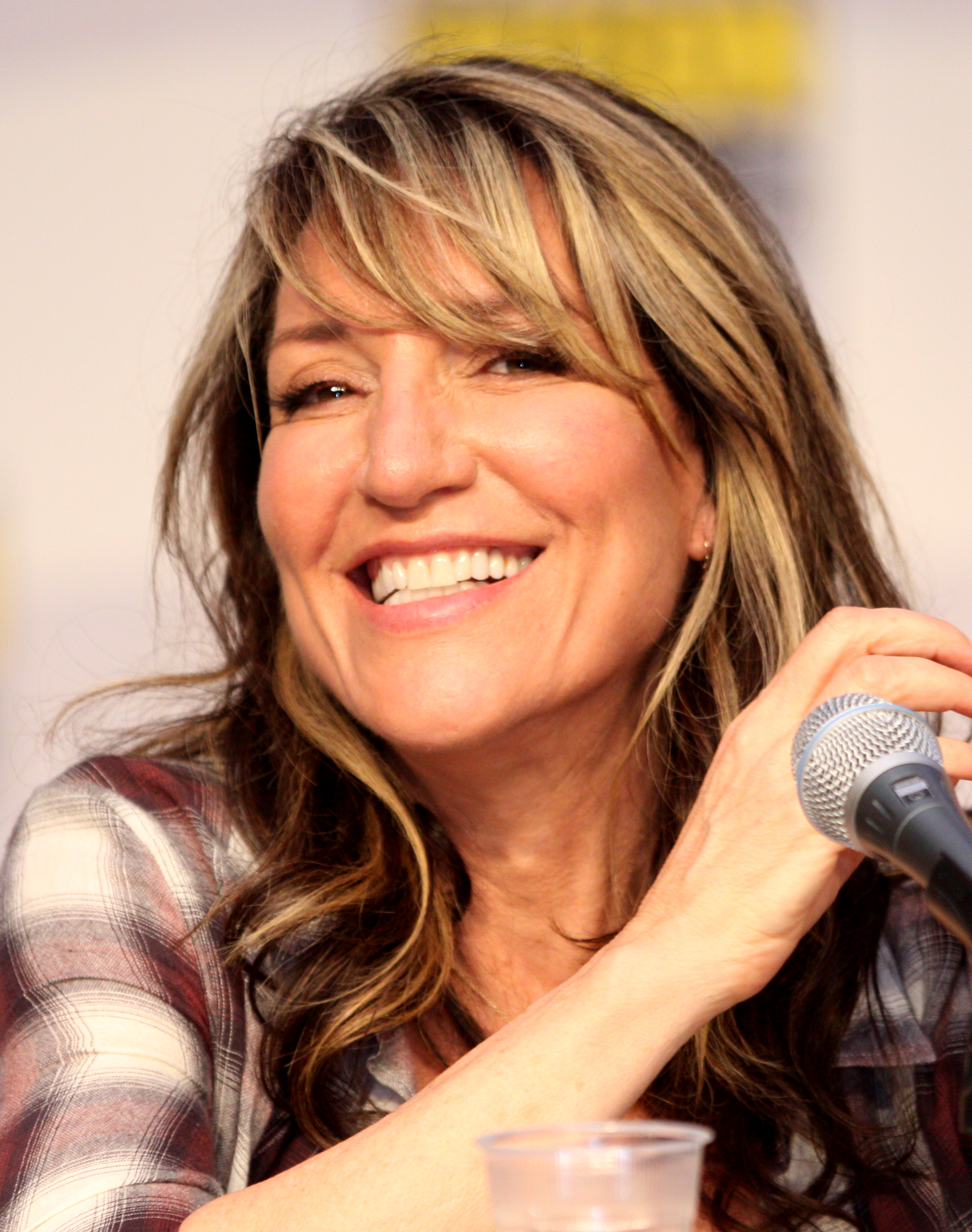
Katey Sagal

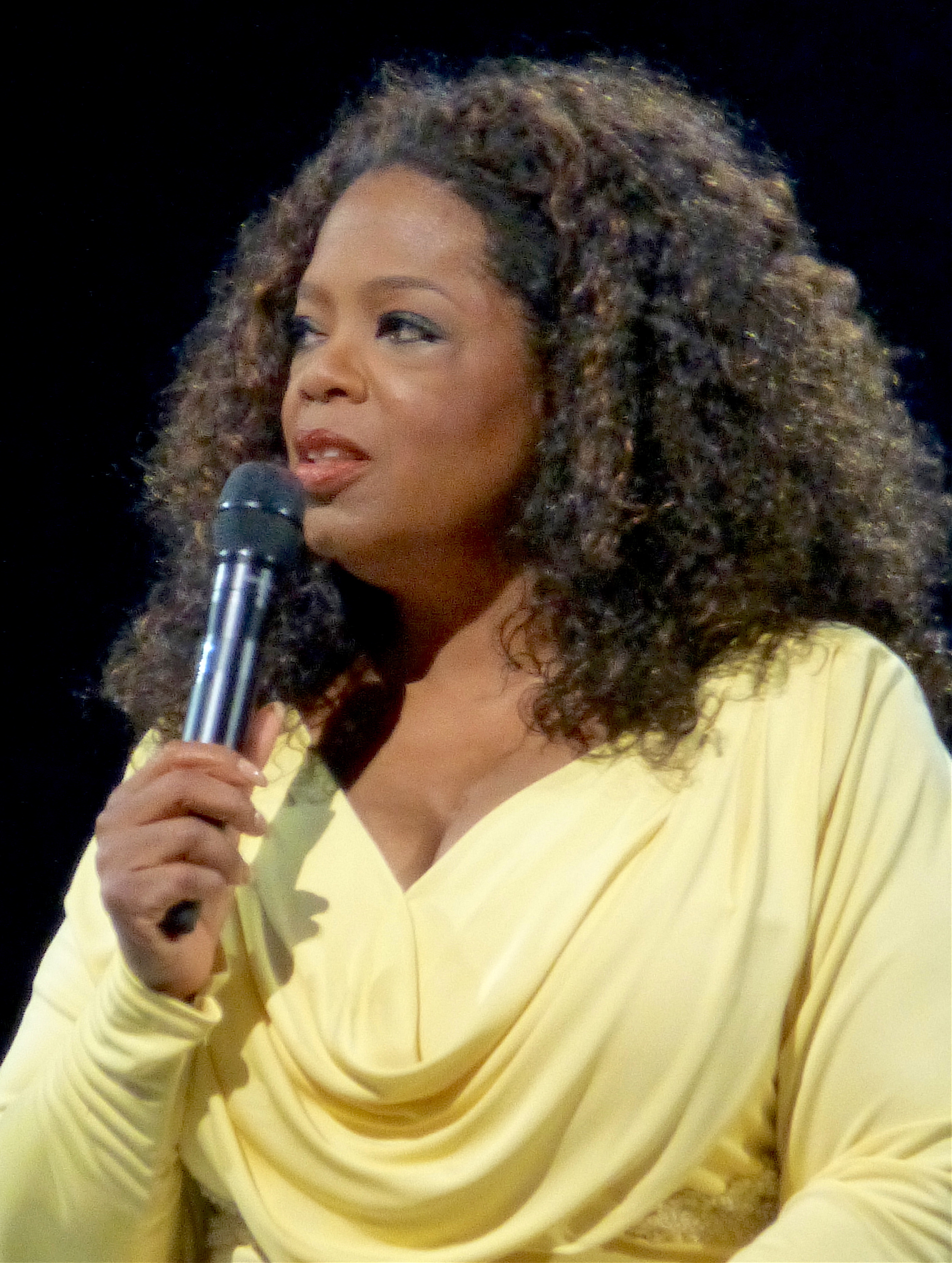
Oprah Winfrey

- January 1 – Djimrangar Dadnadji, 16th prime minister of Chad (d. 2019)
- January 4 – Tina Knowles, African-American fashion designer; mother of R&B singers Beyoncé and Solange Knowles
- January 5 – Alex English, American basketball player
- January 6 – Anthony Minghella, British film, theatre director (d. 2008)
- January 7
  - Jodi Long, American actress
  - José María Vitier, Cuban music composer, pianist
- January 8 – Julieta Castellanos, Honduran sociologist
- January 11 – Kailash Satyarthi, Indian activist, Nobel Peace Prize laureate
- January 11 – Balachandra Menon, Indian Malayalam film director and actor
- January 12 – Howard Stern, American radio host
- January 13 – Trevor Rabin, South African–American musician
- January 14 – Masanobu Fuchi, Japanese professional wrestler
- January 16 – Morten P. Meldal, Danish chemist, Nobel Prize laureate
- January 17 – Robert F. Kennedy Jr., environmental lawyer, 2024 United States presidential election candidate
- January 19
  - Ted DiBiase, American professional wrestler
  - Katey Sagal, American actress and singer
  - Katharina Thalbach, German actress
- January 21 – Thomas de Maizière, German politician
- January 23 – Franco De Vita, Venezuelan singer, songwriter
- January 28
  - Bruno Metsu, French football coach (d. 2013)
  - Kaneto Shiozawa, Japanese voice actor (d. 2000)
  - Willy Telavi, 11th prime minister of Tuvalu
- January 29
  - Yukinobu Hoshino, Japanese cartoonist
  - Oprah Winfrey, African-American actress, talk show hostess, producer and publisher
- January 31 – Mark Slavin, Israeli wrestler (d. 1972)

=== February ===
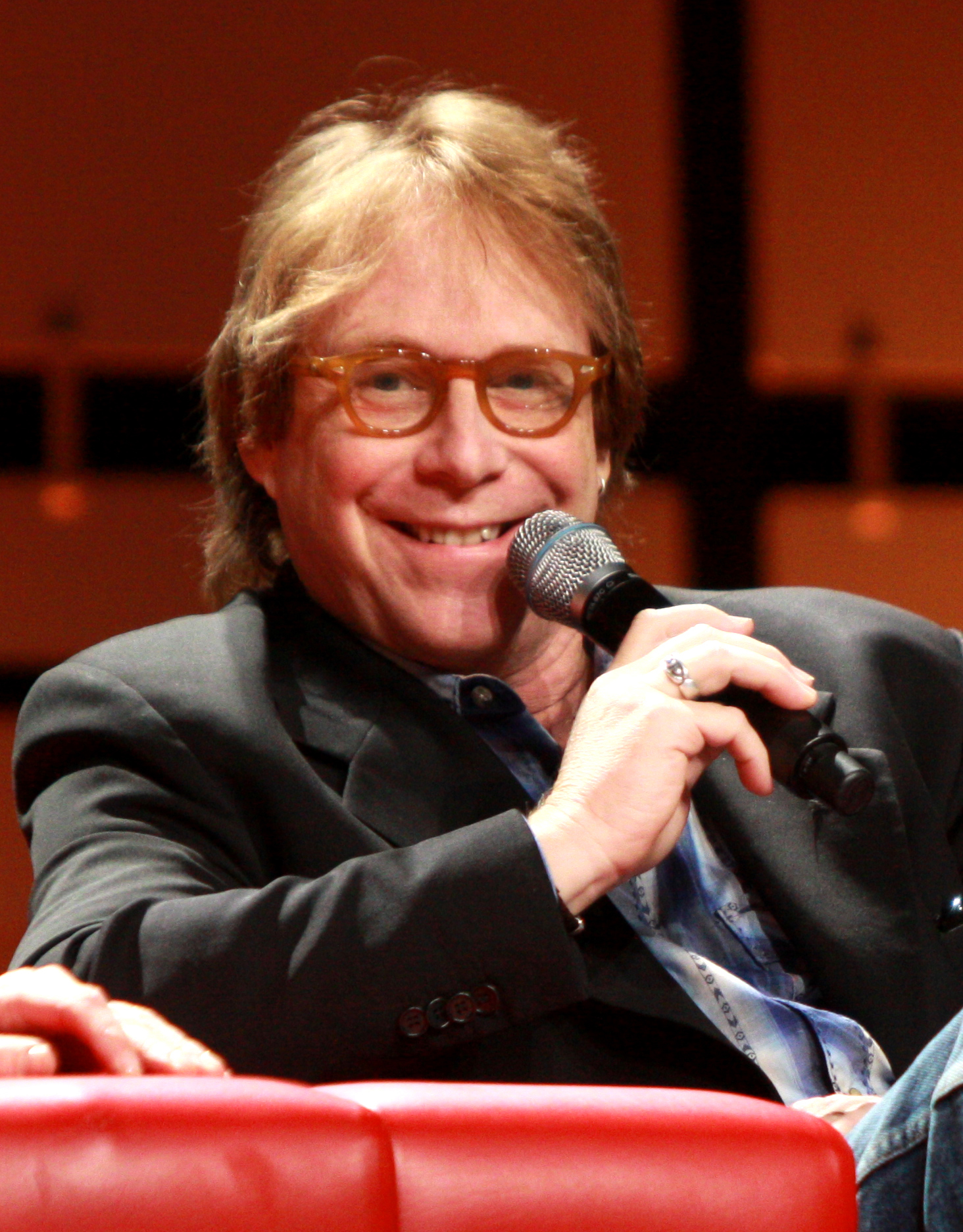
Bill Mumy

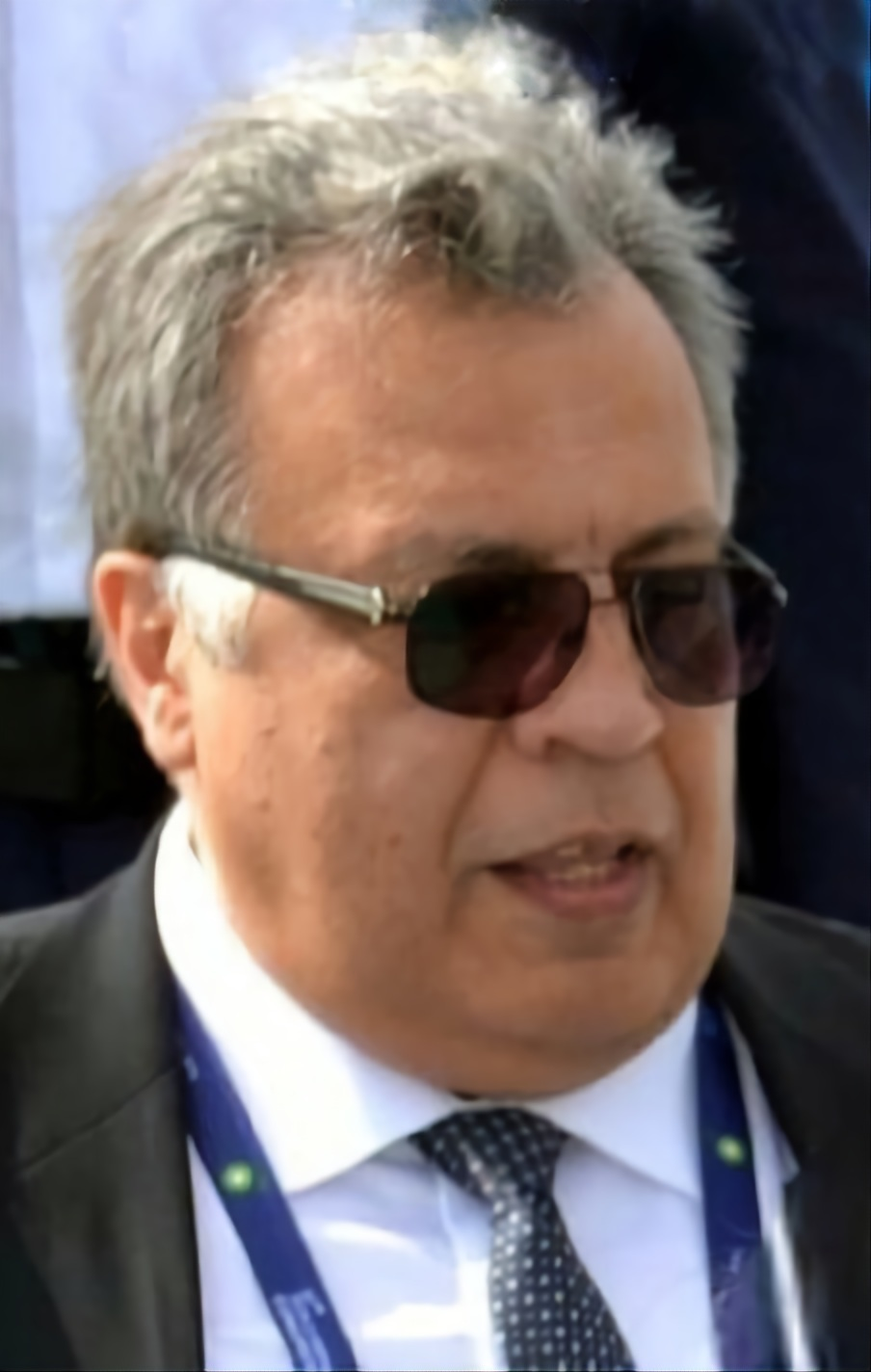
Andrei Karlov

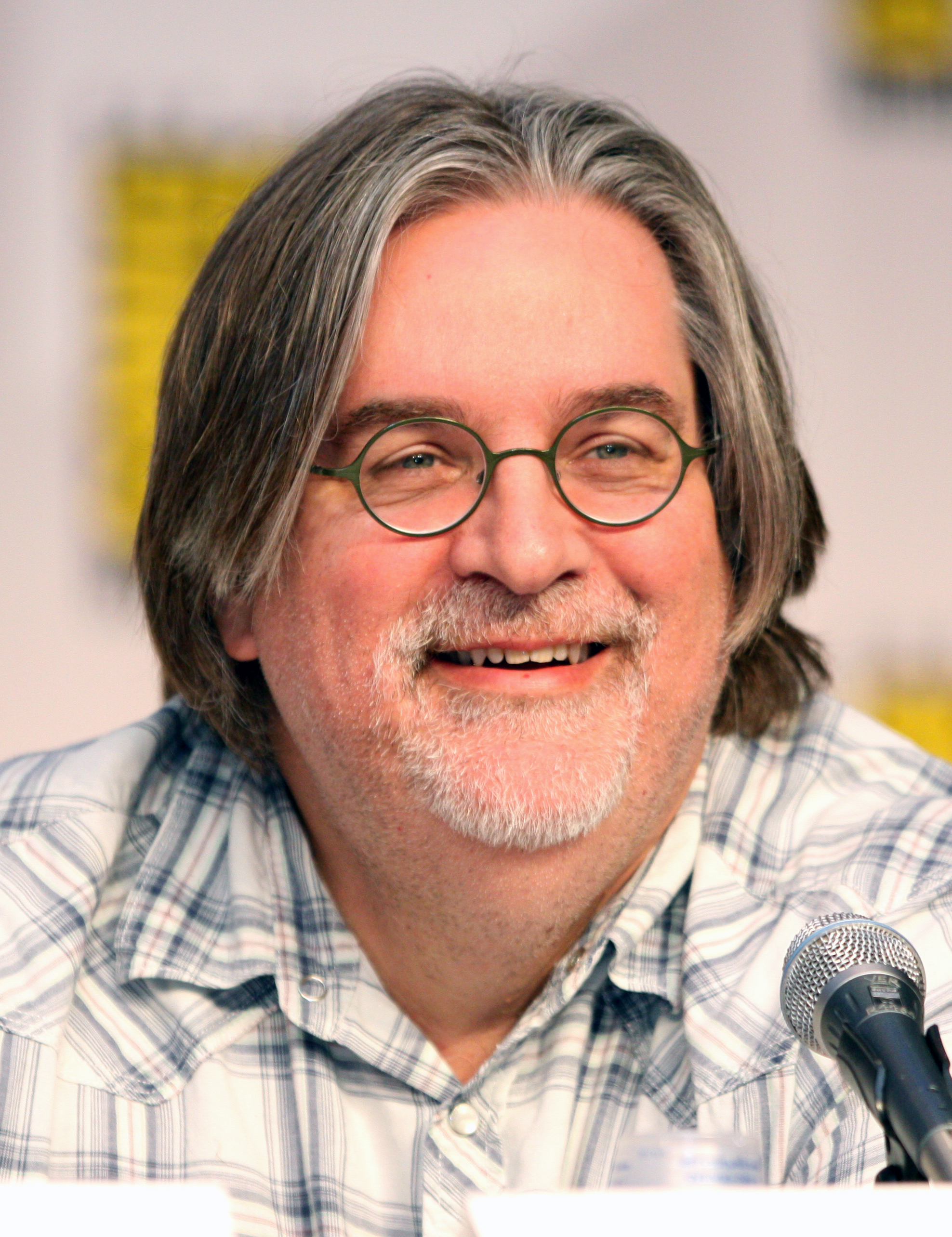
Matt Groening

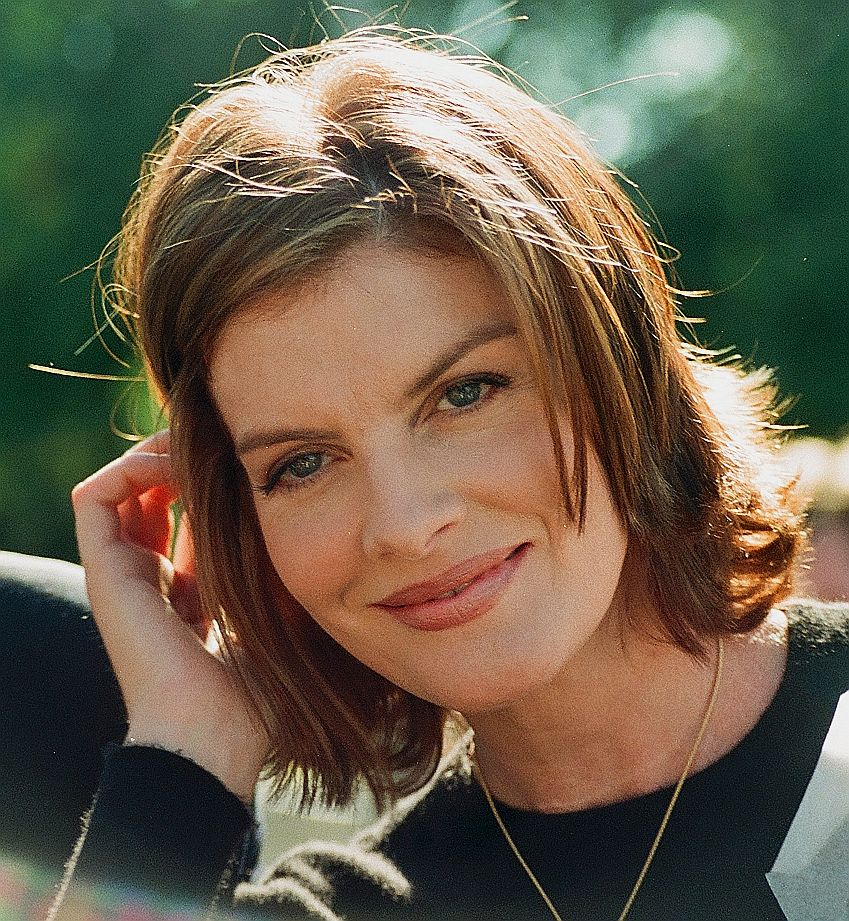
Rene Russo

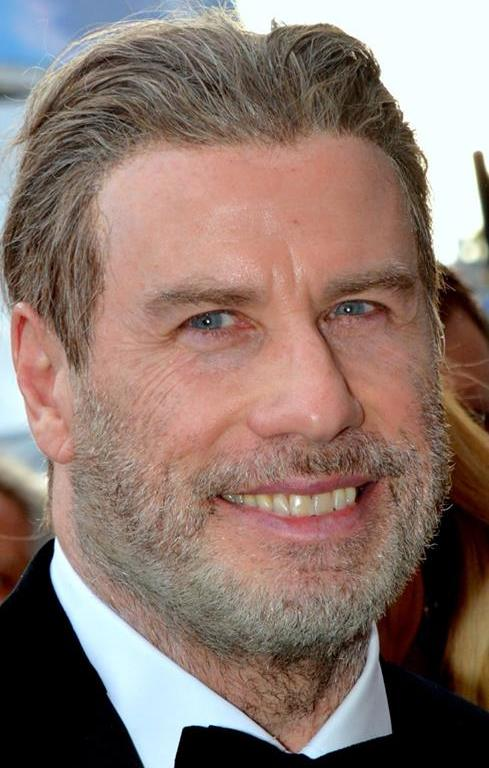
John Travolta

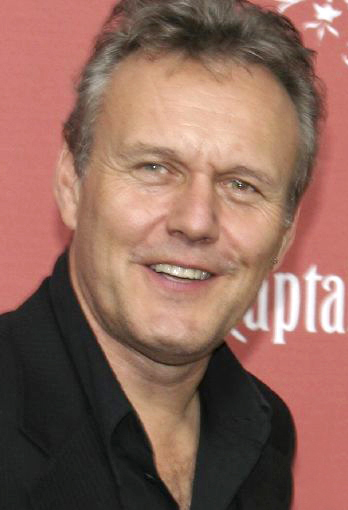
Anthony Head

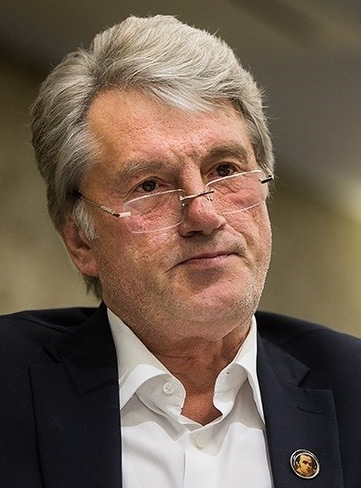
Viktor Yushchenko

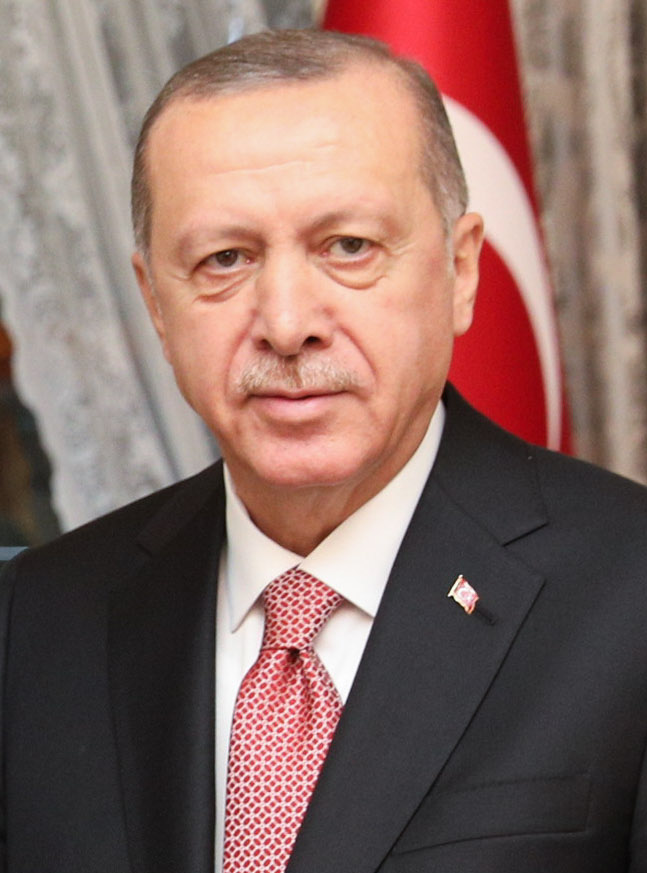
Recep Tayyip Erdoğan

- February 1 – Bill Mumy, American actor, musician (Lost in Space)
- February 2 – Christie Brinkley, American model
- February 4 – Andrei Karlov, Russian diplomat (d. 2016)
- February 7 – Dieter Bohlen, German music producer and singer-songwriter (Modern Talking, Blue System)
- February 9 – Gina Rinehart, Australian mining tycoon
- February 11 – Noriyuki Asakura, Japanese composer
- February 12
  - Joseph Jordania, Georgian-Australian musicologist, academic
  - Evangelos Basiakos, Greek politician, long term MP, and minister
  - Tzimis Panousis, Greek comedian, singer, and author
- February 15 – Matt Groening, American cartoonist (The Simpsons)
- February 16
  - Iain Banks, Scottish author (d. 2013)
  - Michael Holding, Jamaican cricket player and commentator
  - Margaux Hemingway, American fashion model and actress (d. 1996)
- February 17
  - Rene Russo, American actress, fashion model
  - Yuji Takada, Japanese free-style wrestler
- February 18 – John Travolta, American actor
- February 19
  - Messaouda Boubaker, Tunisian writer
  - Sócrates, Brazilian footballer (d. 2011)
- February 20
  - Anthony Head, English actor, musician (d. 2026)
  - Patty Hearst, American heiress and kidnap victim
- February 23 – Viktor Yushchenko, President of Ukraine
- February 24 – Sid Meier, Canadian programmer, game designer, notable for the Civilization series
- February 25 – Gerardo Pelusso, Uruguayan football manager
- February 26 – Recep Tayyip Erdoğan, 12th President of Turkey

=== March ===
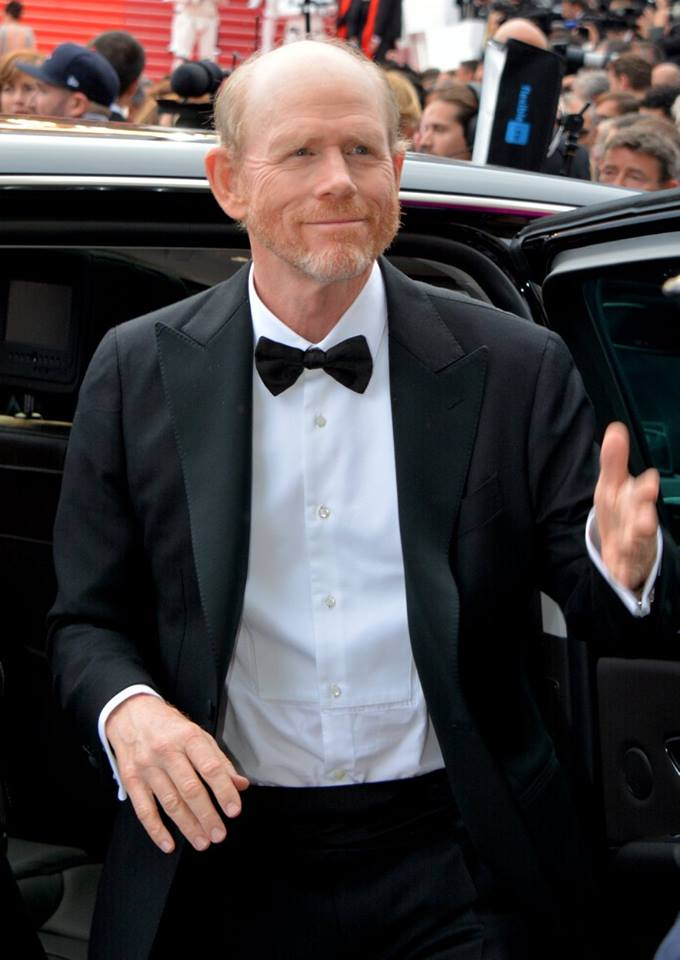
Ron Howard

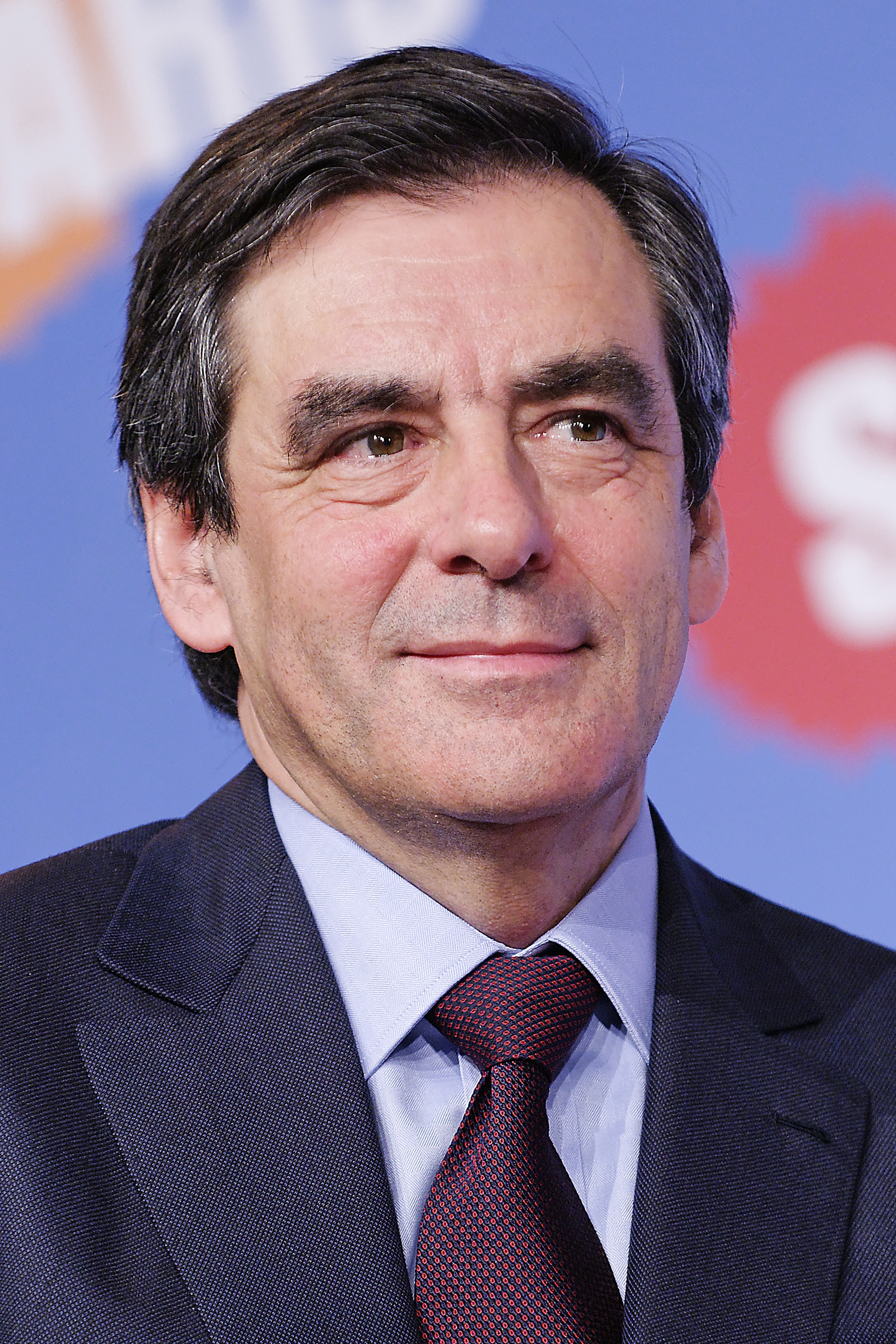
François Fillon

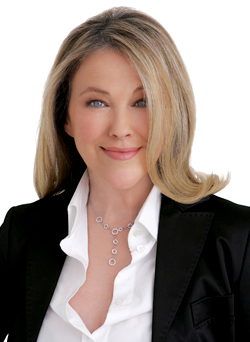
Catherine O'Hara

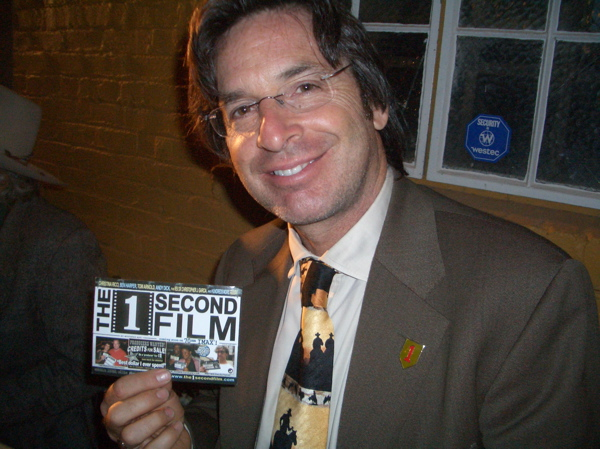
Robert Carradine

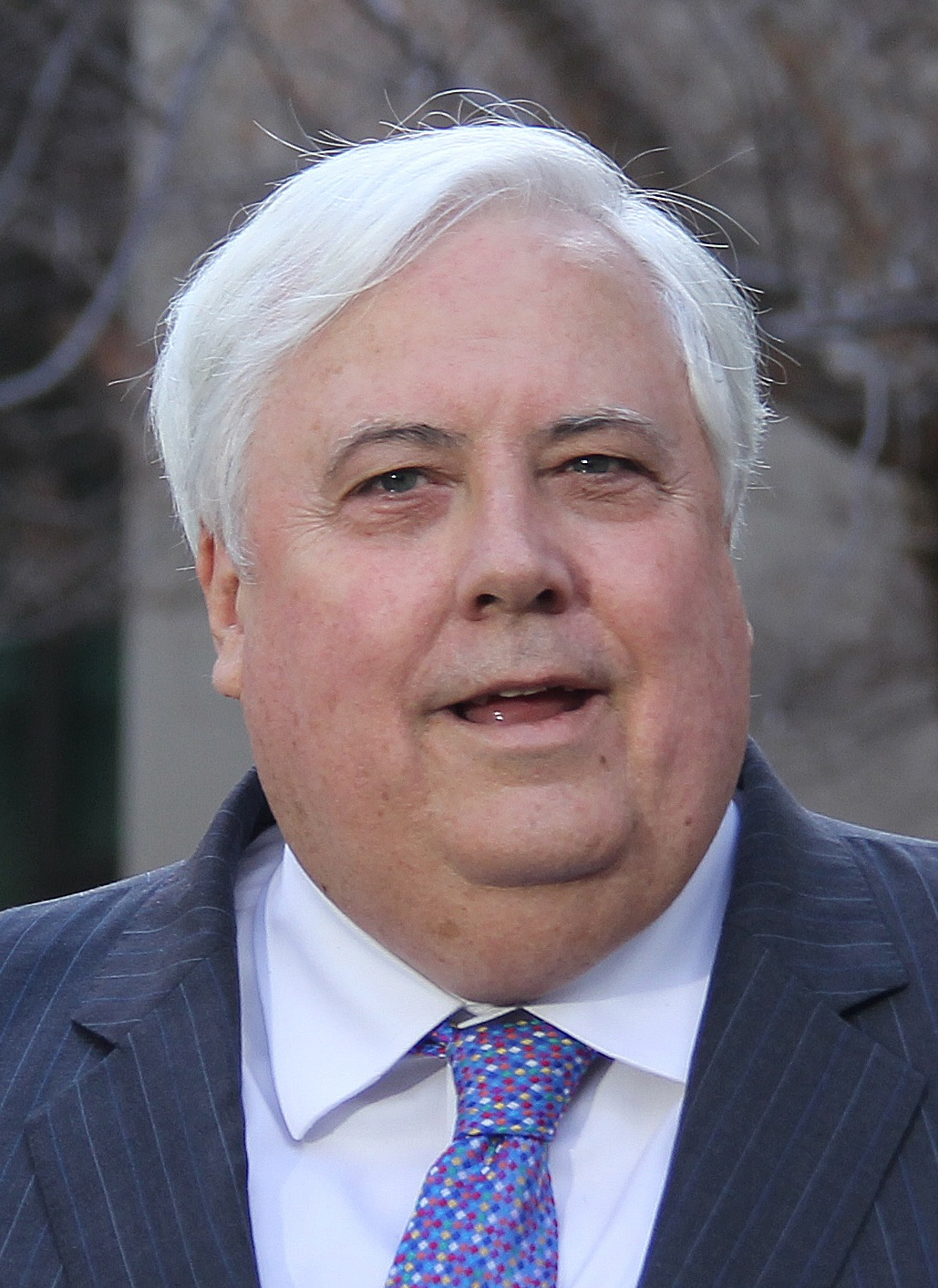
Clive Palmer

- March 1
  - Peter Spellos, American actor, voice actor
  - Catherine Bach, American actress (The Dukes of Hazzard)
  - Ron Howard, American actor, director and producer
- March 4
  - François Fillon, Prime Minister of France
  - Catherine O'Hara, Canadian actress (SCTV) (d. 2026)
  - Irina Ratushinskaya, Russian writer
- March 5 – João Lourenço, President of Angola
- March 6 – Harald Schumacher, German football goalkeeper
- March 8
  - Marie-Theres Nadig, Swiss alpine skier
  - David Wilkie, Scottish former world record holder, Olympic gold medallist swimmer (1976)
- March 9 – Bobby Sands, Irish republican hunger striker (d. 1981)
- March 13 – The Baroness Amos, British politician
- March 15
  - Massimo Bubola, Italian singer, songwriter
  - Craig Wasson, American actor
- March 16
  - Nancy Wilson, American rock musician
  - Jimmy Nail, English singer, songwriter, actor, film producer, and television writer
- March 17 – Lesley-Anne Down, British actress
- March 18 – James F. Reilly, American astronaut
- March 20 – Louis Sachar, American author
- March 23
  - Geno Auriemma, American basketball coach
  - Hideyuki Hori, Japanese voice actor
- March 24
  - Robert Carradine, American actor (d. 2026)
  - Donna Pescow, American actress, director (Angie)
- March 26
  - Wendy Fulton, American actress
  - Kazuhiko Inoue, Japanese voice actor
  - Clive Palmer, Australian mining tycoon
- March 29 – Karen Ann Quinlan, American right-to-die cause célèbre (d. 1985)

=== April ===
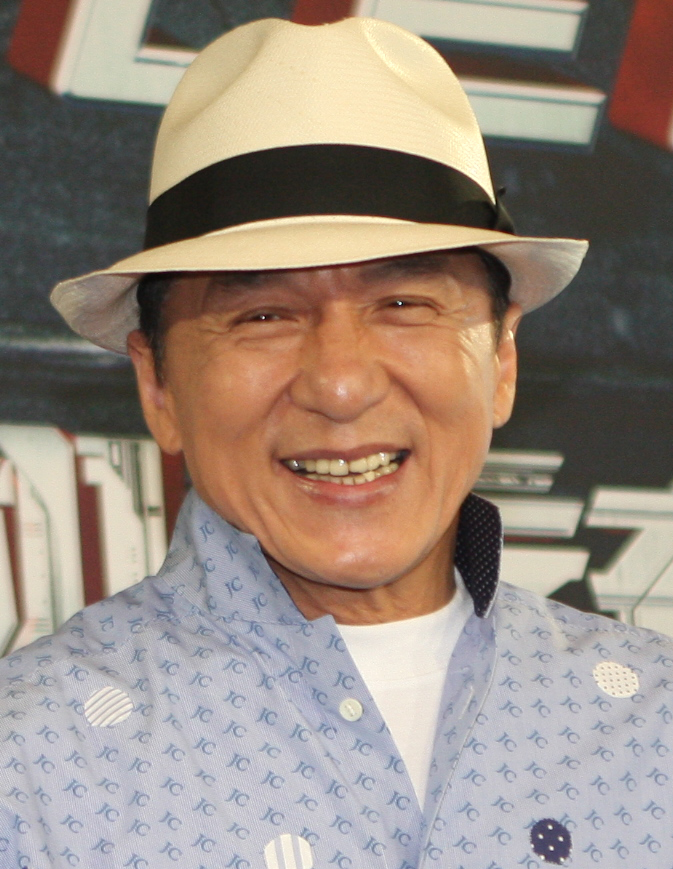
Jackie Chan

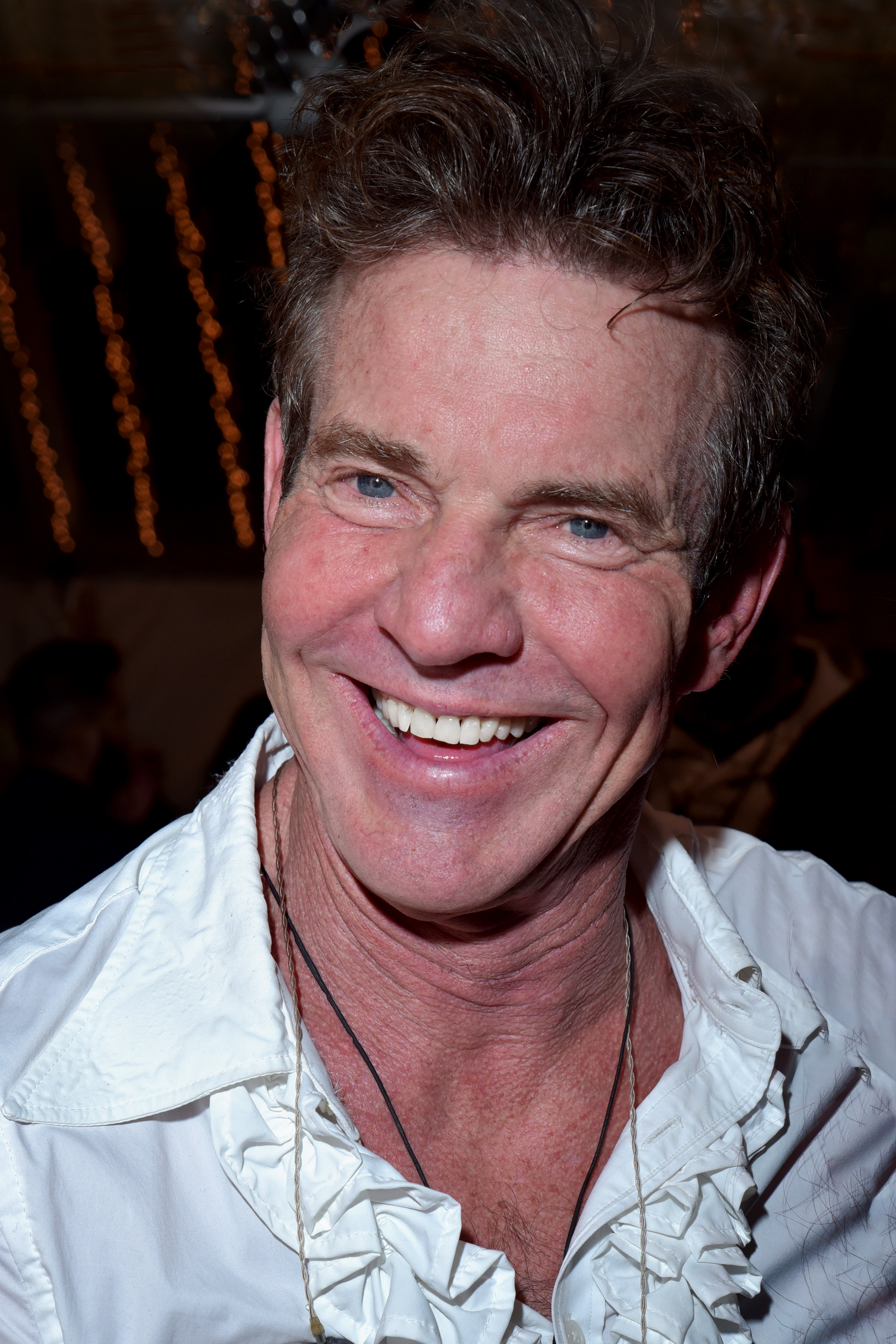
Dennis Quaid

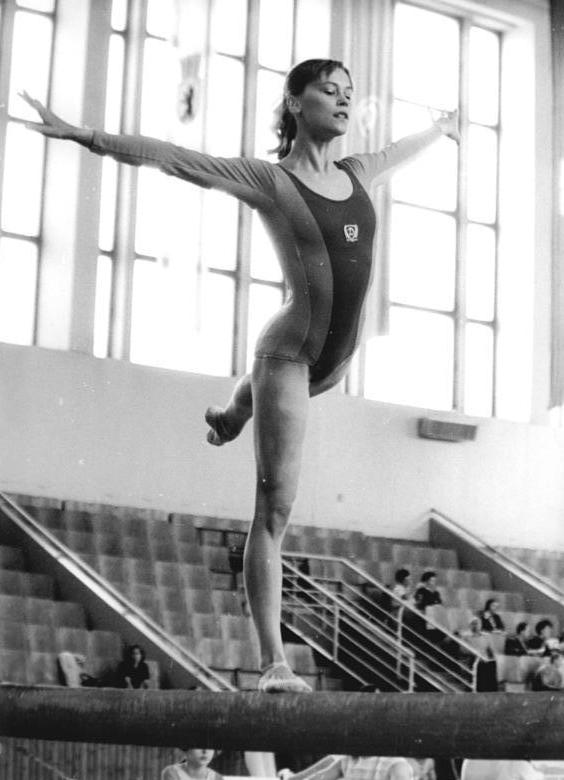
Angelika Hellmann

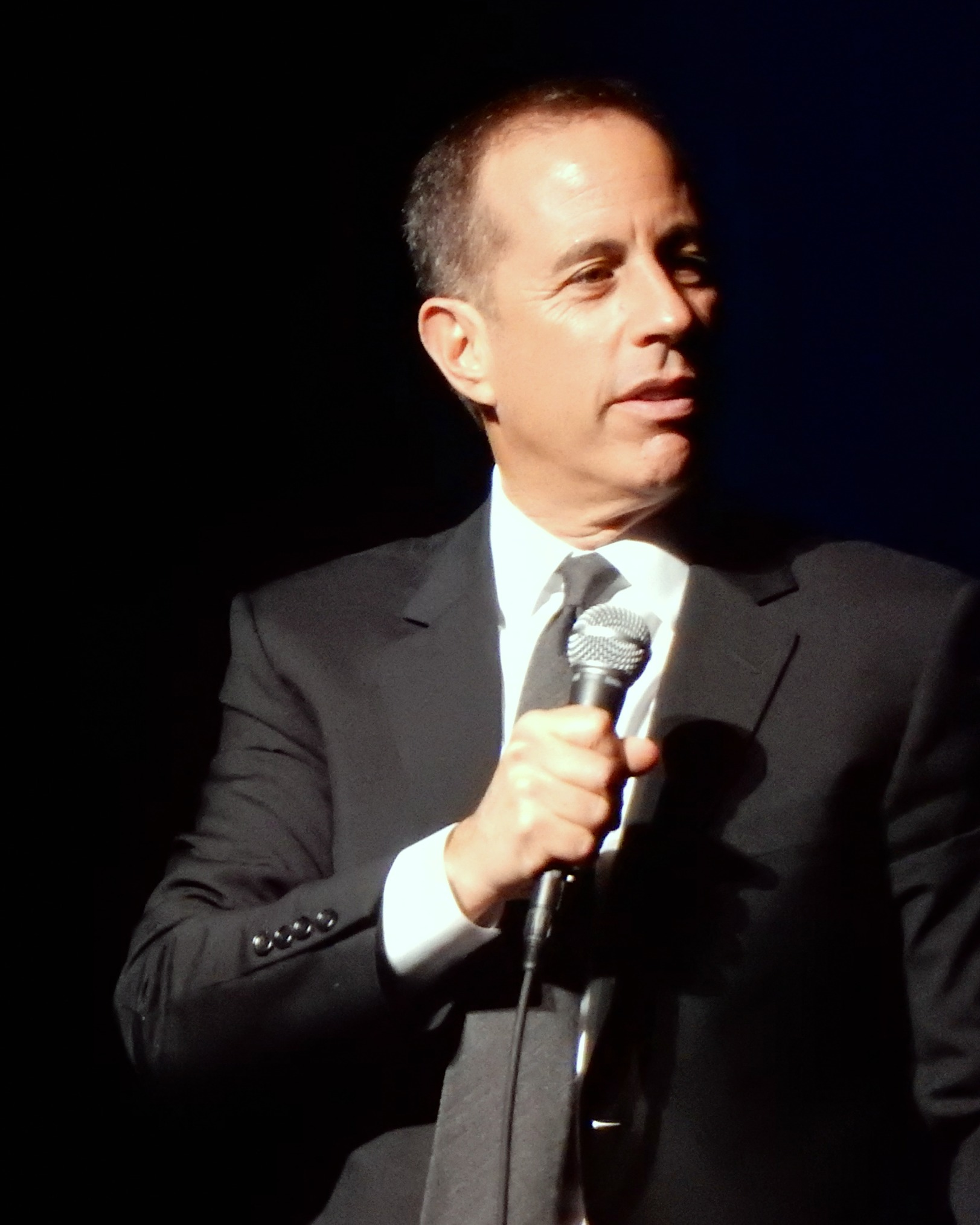
Jerry Seinfeld

- April 1
  - Dieter Müller, German soccer player
  - Jeff Porcaro, American drummer and songwriter (d. 1992)
- April 2 – Susumu Hirasawa, Japanese musician
- April 5 – Guy Bertrand, Canadian linguist, radio/television personality
- April 7 – Jackie Chan, Hong Kong-born actor, martial artist
- April 8 – Gary Carter, American baseball player (d. 2012)
- April 9
  - Steve Holt, Canadian musician
  - Dennis Quaid, American actor
- April 10
  - Anacani, Mexican-born American singer (The Lawrence Welk Show)
  - Angelika Hellmann, East German artistic gymnast
- April 14 – Bruce Sterling, American science fiction writer
- April 16 – Ellen Barkin, American actress
- April 17
  - Norio Imamura, Japanese voice actor
  - Roddy Piper, Canadian wrestler (d. 2015)
- April 22 – Jōji Nakata, Japanese voice actor
- April 23
  - Peter Nyombi, Ugandan lawyer, politician (d. 2018)
  - Michael Moore, American filmmaker, political activist (Bowling for Columbine)
- April 27 – Frank Bainimarama, Fijian politician
- April 28 – Michael Daugherty, American composer
- April 29
  - Kazuko Kurosawa, Japanese costume designer
  - Jerry Seinfeld, American actor, comedian and producer (Seinfeld)
- April 30 – Jane Campion, New Zealand screenwriter, producer, and director

=== May ===
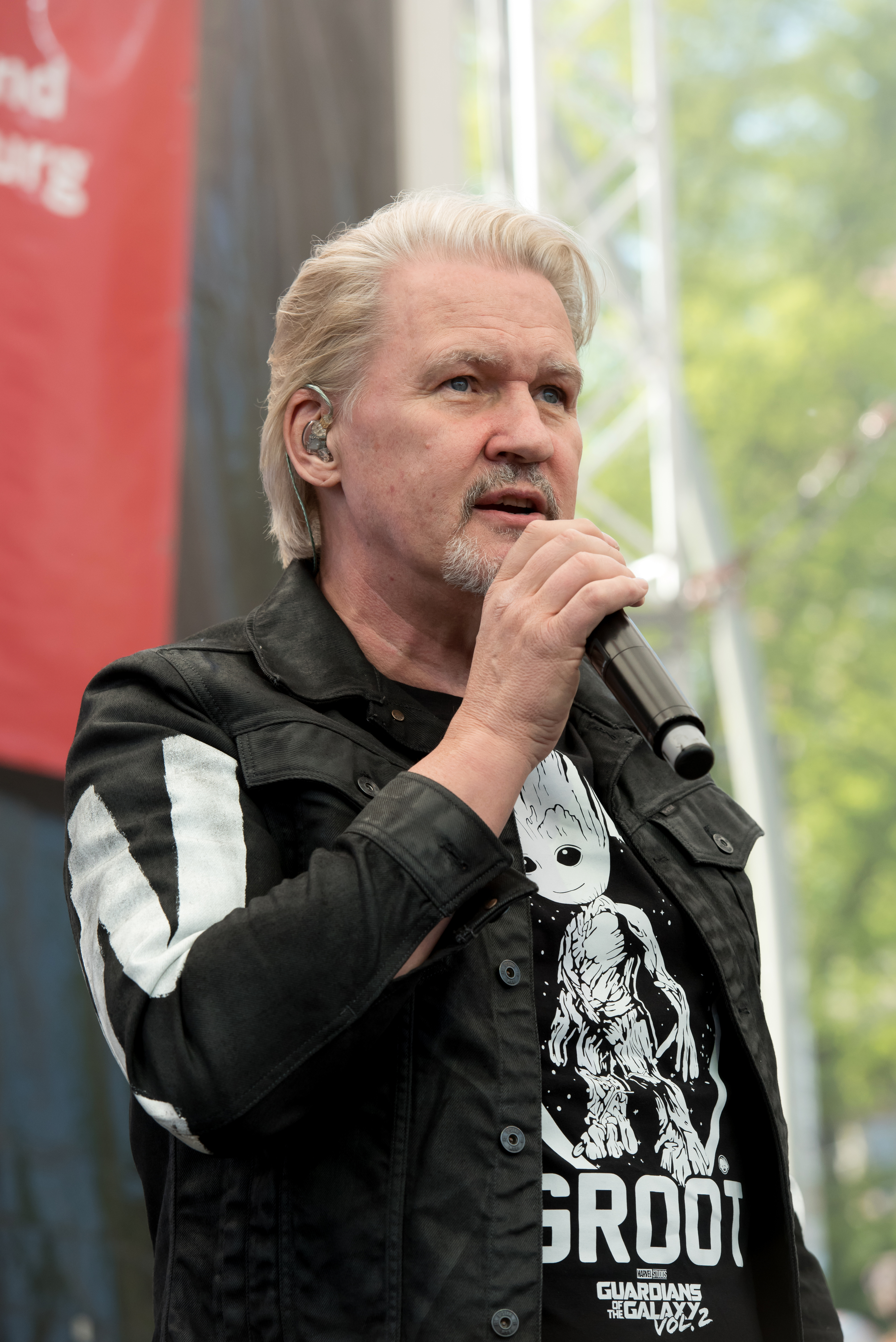
Johnny Logan

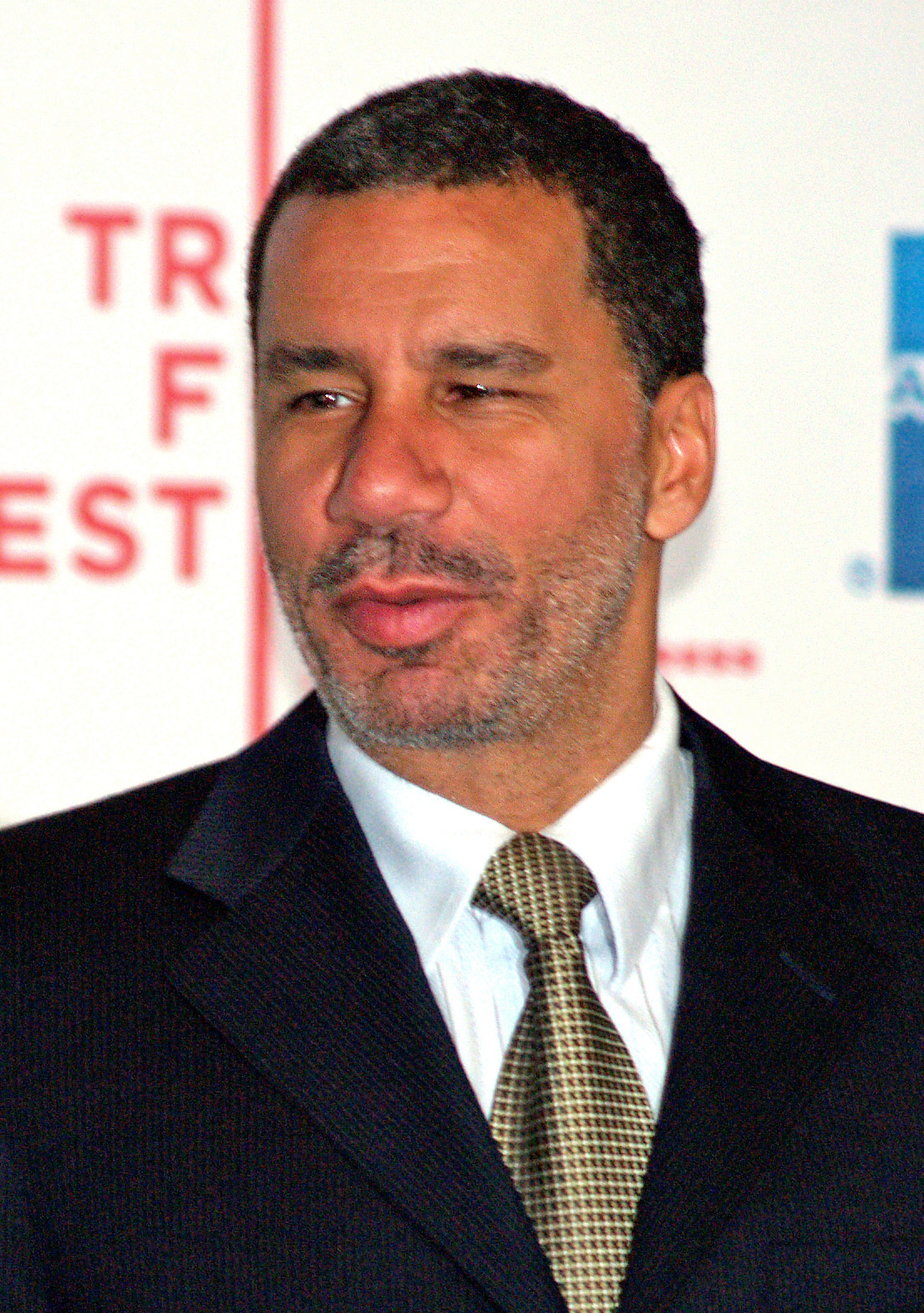
David Paterson

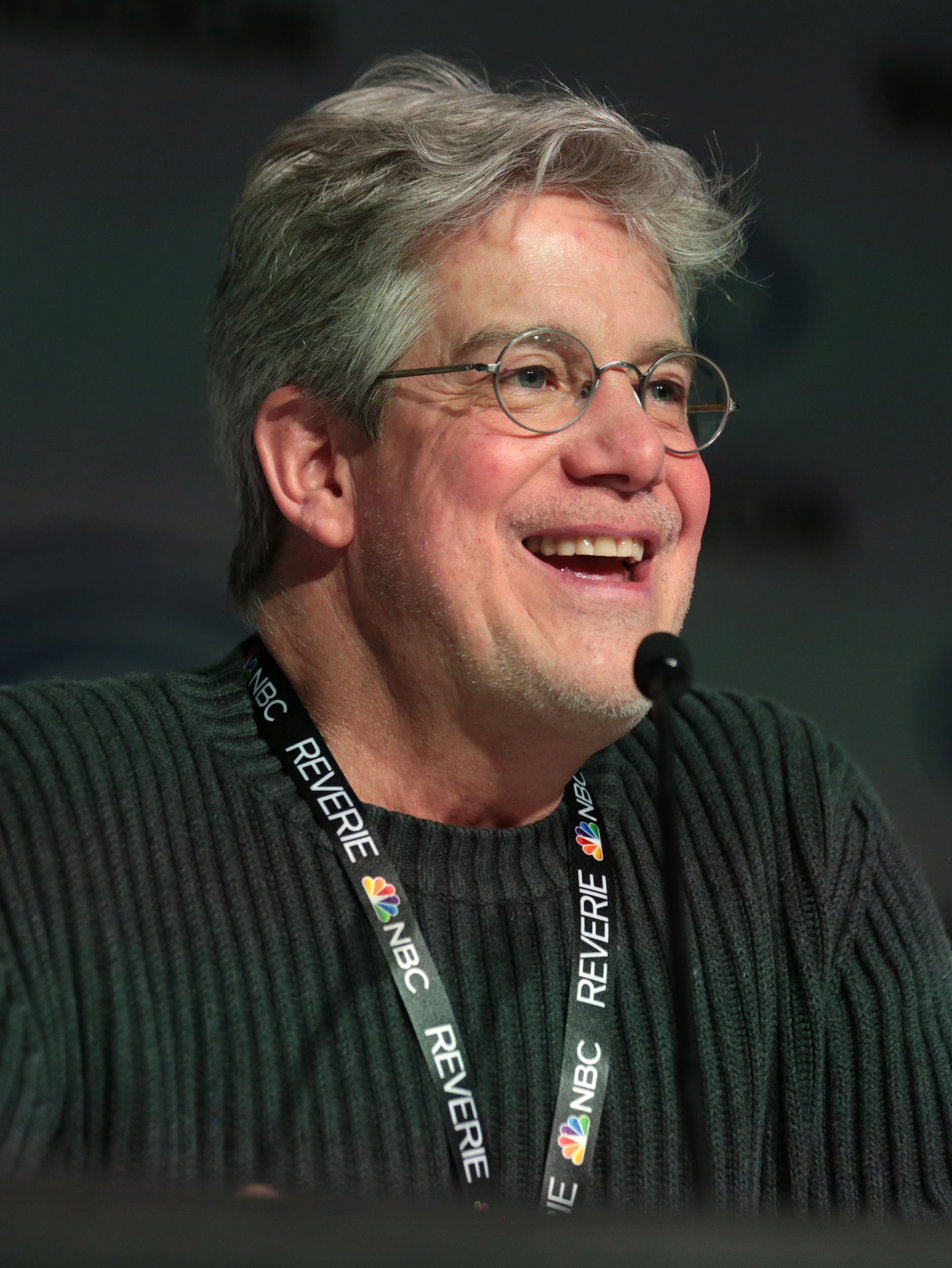
Townsend Coleman

- May 1
  - Ray Parker Jr., American singer and songwriter
  - Maatia Toafa, 2-time prime minister of Tuvalu
- May 2 – Elliot Goldenthal, American composer
- May 5 – David Azulai, Israeli politician (d. 2018)
- May 6 – Angela Hernández Nuñez, Dominican writer
- May 7
  - Philippe Geluck, Belgian cartoonist
  - Amy Heckerling, American film director
- May 8 – Pam Arciero, Hawaiian-born puppeteer (Sesame Street)
- May 10 – Amos Guttman, Israeli film director (d. 1993)
- May 13 – Johnny Logan, Australian-born Irish singer, composer and Eurovision Song Contest winner (1980, 1987)
- May 14
  - María Dolores Katarain ("Yoyes"), Spanish Basque separatist leader (d. 1986)
  - Peter J. Ratcliffe, English cellular biologist, Nobel Prize laureate
- May 19 – Phil Rudd, Australian rock drummer (AC/DC)
- May 20 – David Paterson, American politician, 55th Governor of New York
- May 22 – Shuji Nakamura, Japanese electronics engineer
- May 25
  - Tantely Andrianarivo, 11th prime minister of Madagascar (d. 2023)
  - Sudirman, Malaysian singer and songwriter (d. 1992)
- May 27
  - Pauline Hanson, Australian politician
  - Lawrence M. Krauss, American theoretical physicist, science writer
- May 28 – John Tory, Canadian politician
- May 29 – Pankaj Kapur, Indian actor

=== June ===
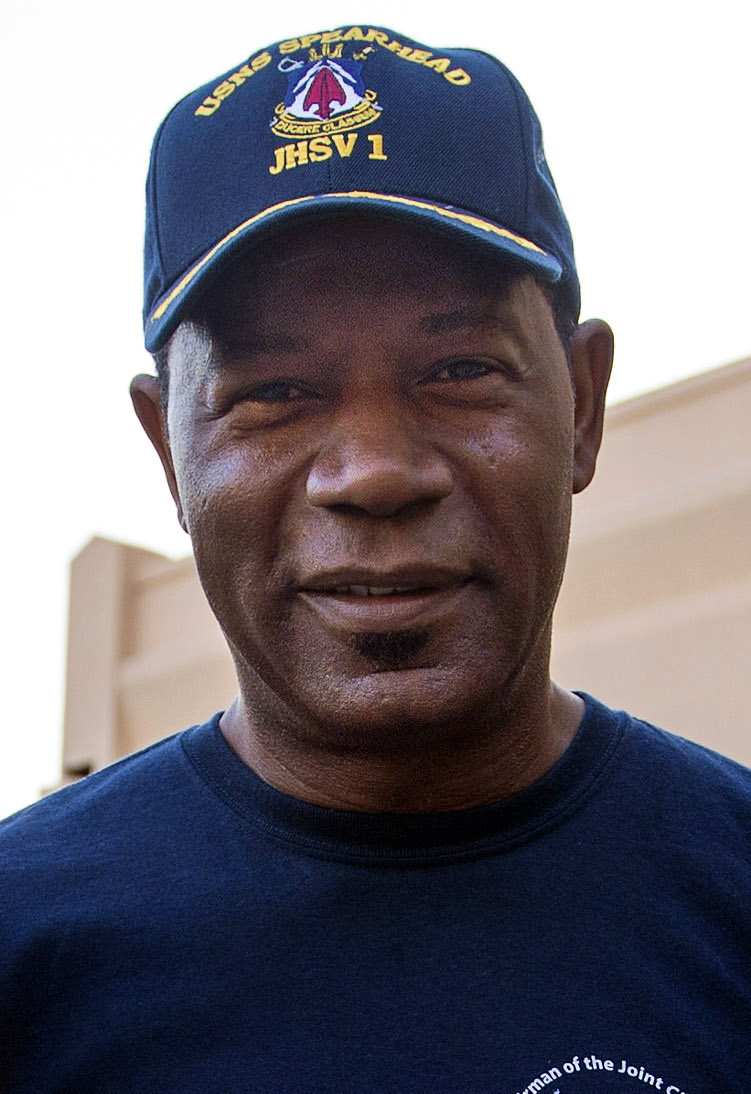
Dennis Haysbert

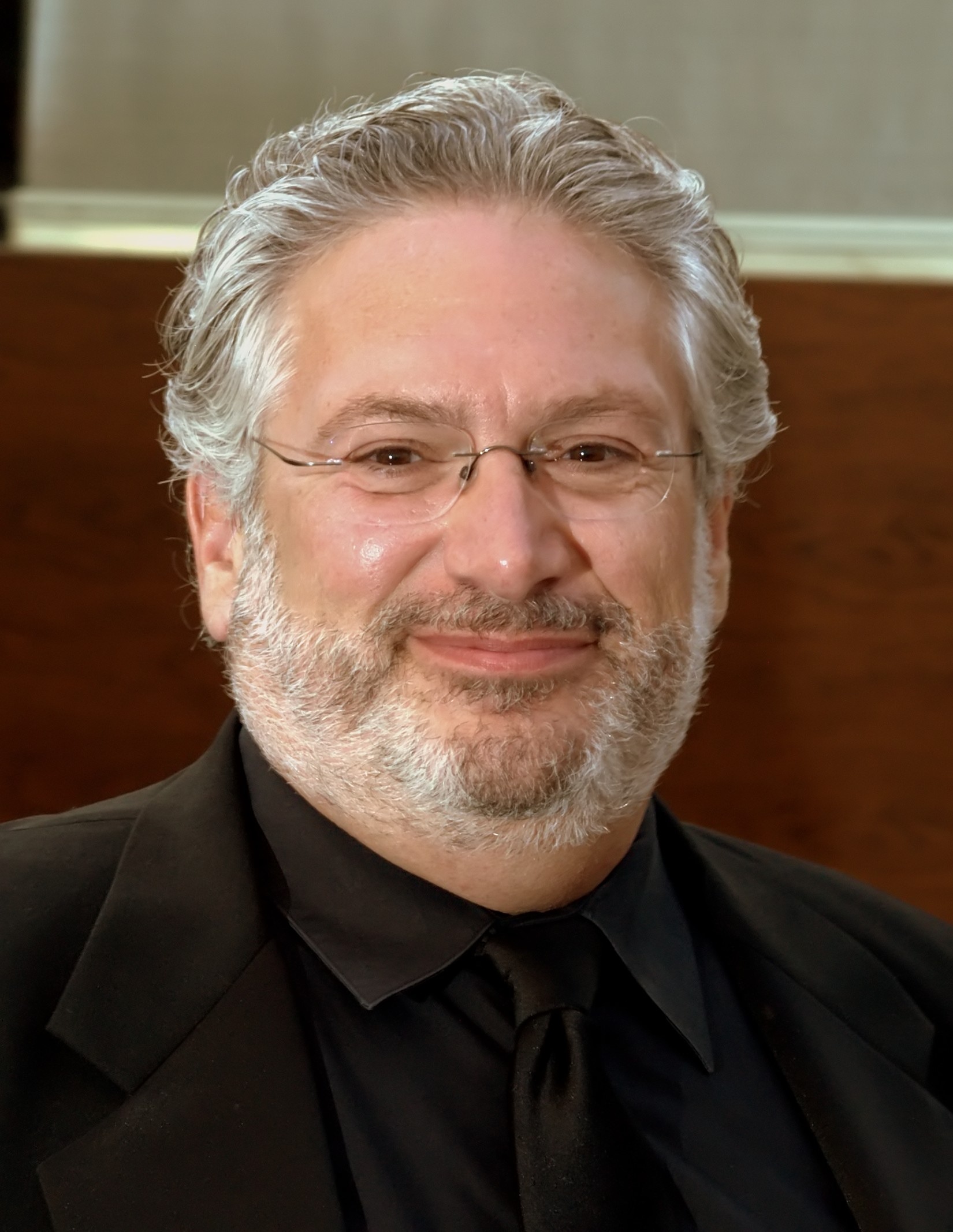
Harvey Fierstein

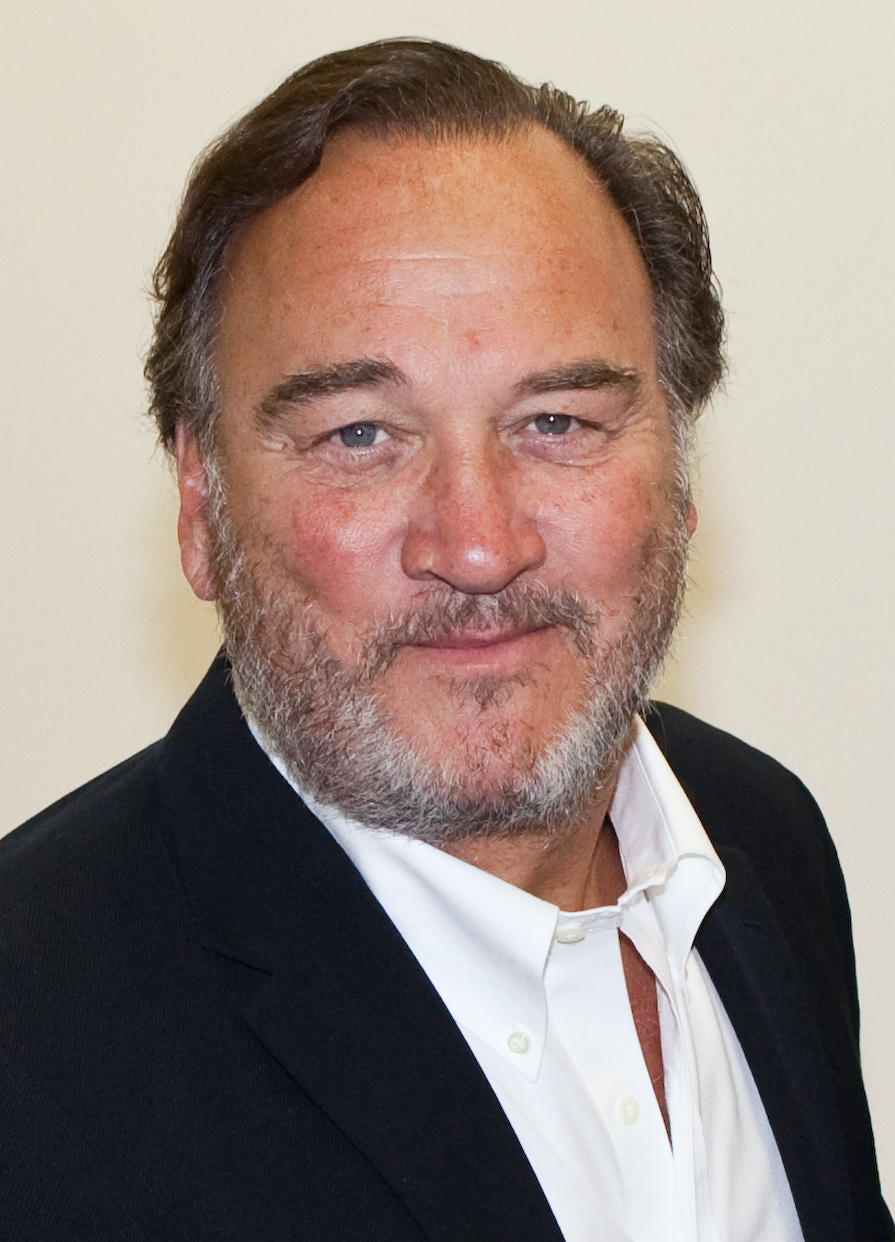
Jim Belushi

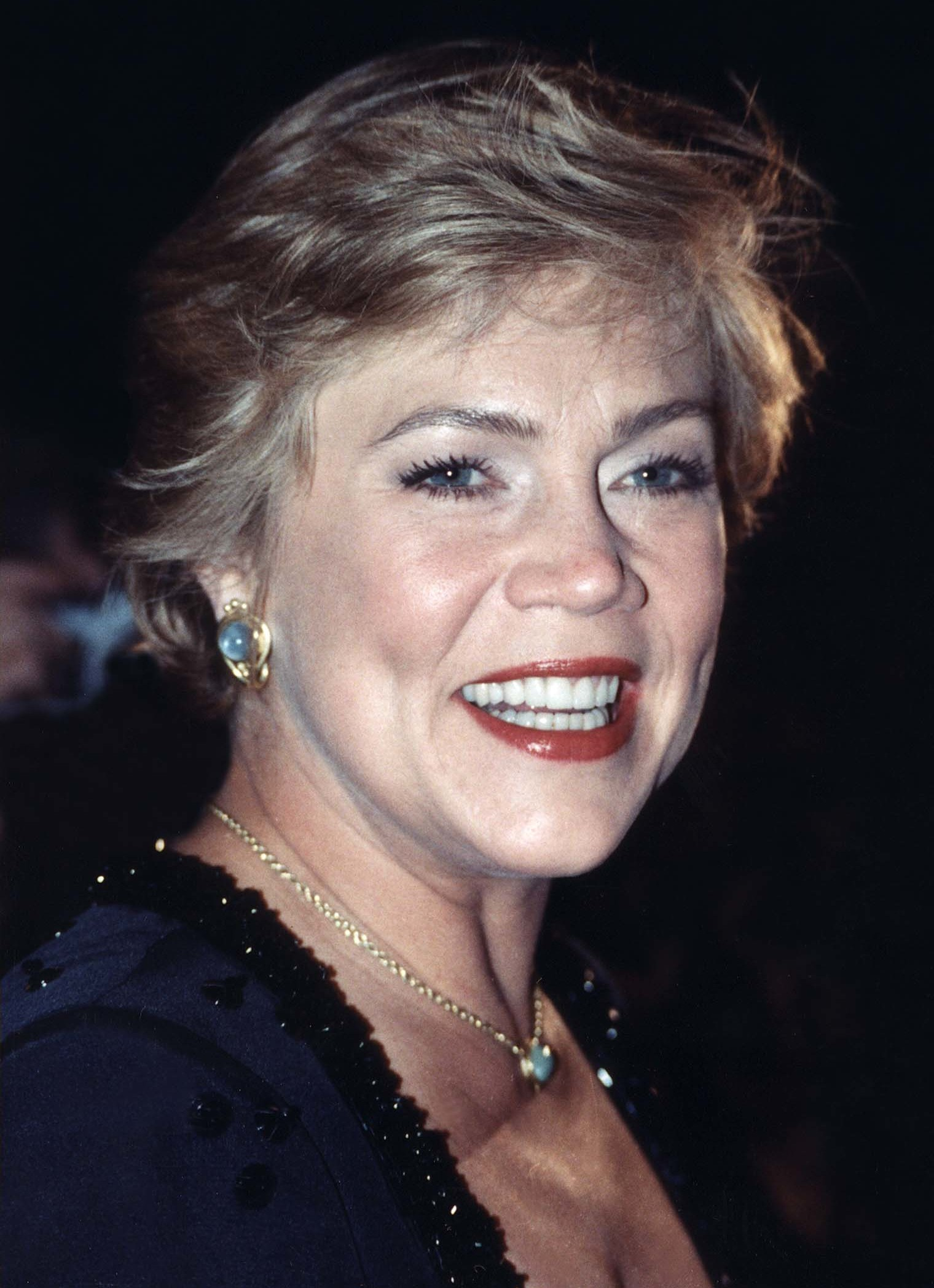
Kathleen Turner

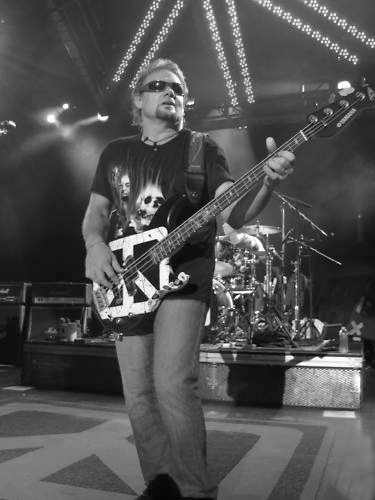
Michael Anthony

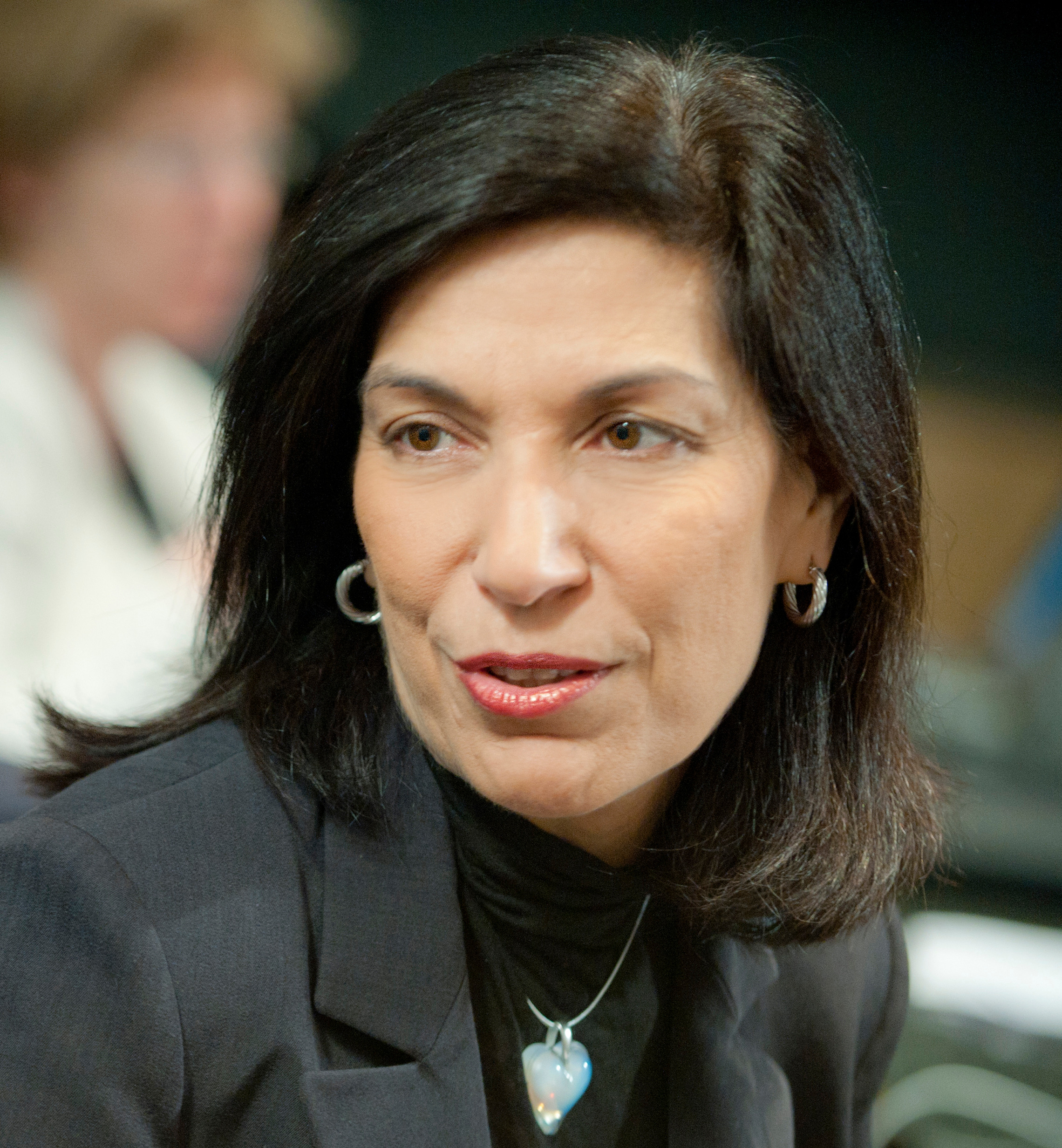
Huda Zoghbi

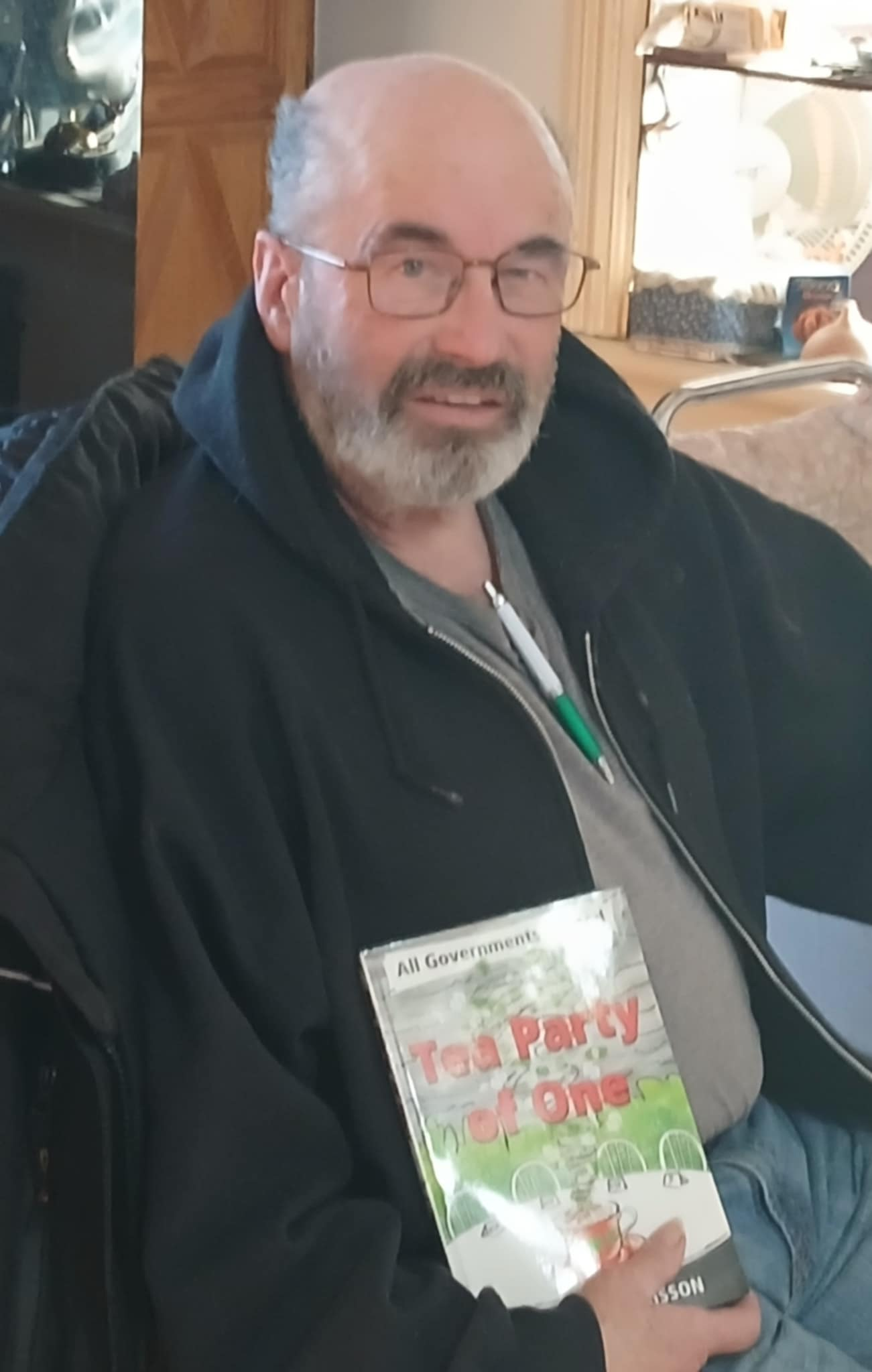
Jean-Serge Brisson

- June 2
  - Mattos Nascimento, Brazilian musician, singer, composer and trombonist
  - Dennis Haysbert, African-American actor
  - Chiyoko Kawashima, Japanese voice actress
- June 4 – Kazuhiro Yamaji, Japanese actor, voice actor
- June 5
  - Nancy Stafford, American actress, Christian author
- June 6 – Harvey Fierstein, American actor
- June 9
  - John Hagelin, American physicist, U.S. presidential candidate
  - Elizabeth May, leader of the Green Party of Canada
- June 10 – Kurt Walker, American ice hockey player (d. 2018)
- June 13
  - Ngozi Okonjo-Iweala, Nigerian-born Director-General of the World Trade Organization
  - Andrzej Lepper, Polish politician (d. 2011)
- June 14 – Will Patton, American actor
- June 15
  - Jim Belushi, American actor, comedian, singer and musician
  - Bob McDonnell, American politician
- June 16 – Sergey Kuryokhin, Russian pianist, composer, improvisor, performance artist and actor (d. 1996)
- June 19
  - Ted Coombs, American artist
  - Kathleen Turner, American actress (Romancing the Stone)
- June 20
  - Michael Anthony, American rock bassist (Van Halen)
  - Karlheinz Brandenburg, German electrical engineer, mathematician
  - Ilan Ramon, Israeli Air Force fighter pilot, Israel's first astronaut (d. 2003)
  - Huda Zoghbi, American geneticist
- June 21 – Chip Ingram, American Christian pastor, author and orator
- June 22
  - Chris Lemmon, American actor, author
  - Freddie Prinze, American actor, comedian (Chico and the Man) (d. 1977)
- June 23 – Carme Pinós, Spanish architect
  - James Plaskitt, British politician
- June 24 – Chang San-cheng, Taiwanese politician
- June 25
  - Luiz Carlos Vasconcelos, Brazilian actor
  - Sonia Sotomayor, Associate Justice of the Supreme Court of the United States
  - Igor Lisovsky, Soviet pair skater
  - Abderrazak Kilani, Tunisian politician, lawyer
- June 26 – Steve Barton, American actor (d. 2001)
- June 27
  - Ron Kirk, Mayor of Dallas, Texas
  - Anita Zagaria, Italian actress
- June 28
  - Jean-Serge Brisson, Canadian author and politician
  - Daniel Dantas, Brazilian actor
  - Ava Barber, American country singer (The Lawrence Welk Show)
  - Alice Krige, South African actress and producer
  - Valentina Quintero, Venezuelan journalist, environmental activist, radio and television hostess.
- June 29
  - Jai Jagadish, Indian film actor, director and producer
  - Rick Honeycutt, American baseball player, coach
- June 30
  - Serzh Sargsyan, President of Armenia
  - Stephen Ouimette, Canadian actor, director
  - Mohammad A. Quayum, Bangladeshi academic, writer, editor, critic and translator
  - Wayne Swan, Australian politician
  - Pierre Charles, Prime Minister of Dominica (d. 2004)

=== July ===
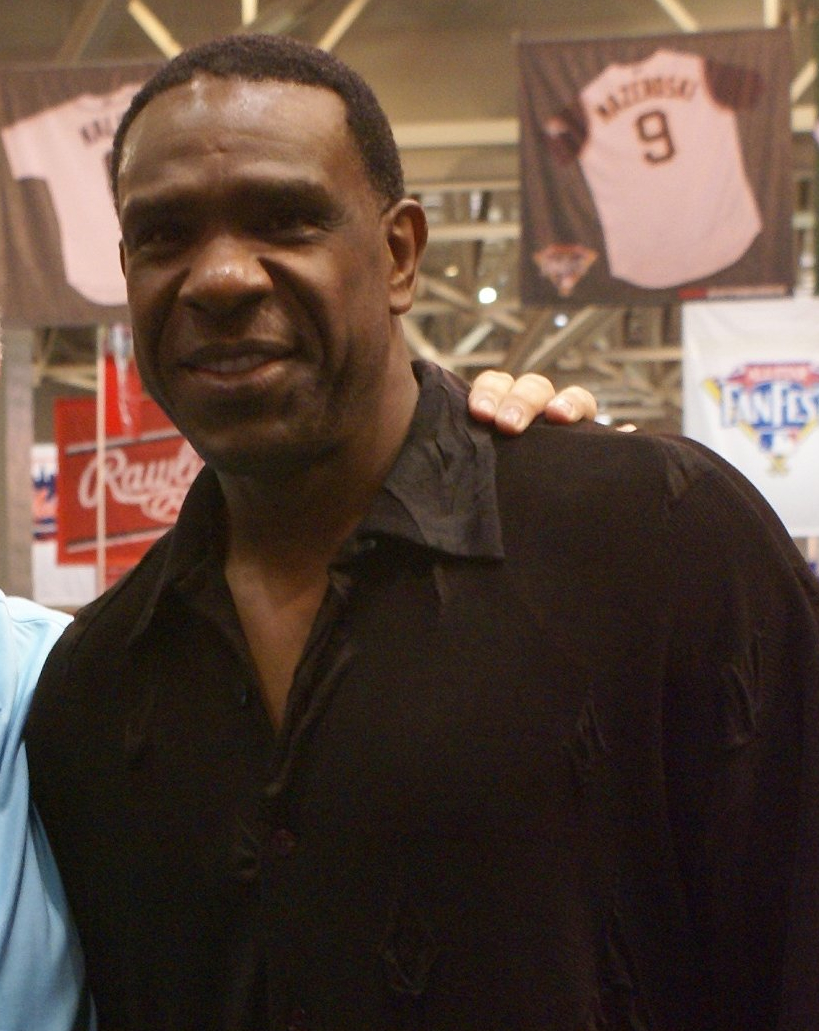
Andre Dawson

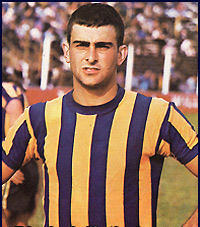
Mario Kempes

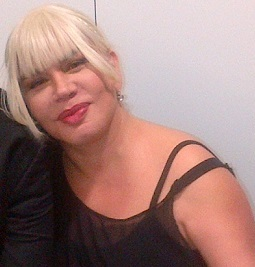
Sezen Aksu

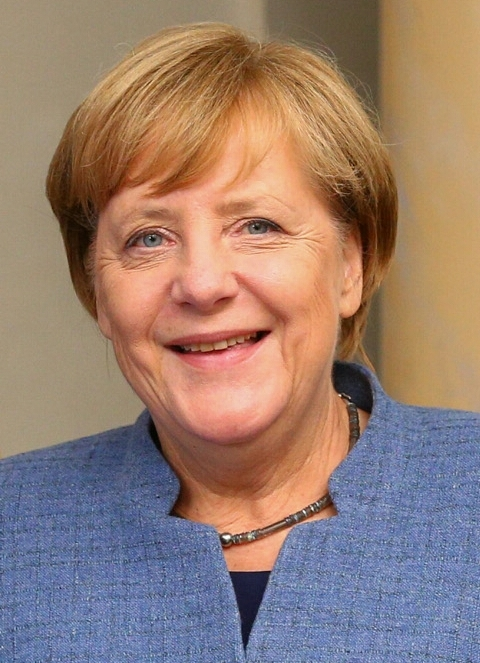
Angela Merkel

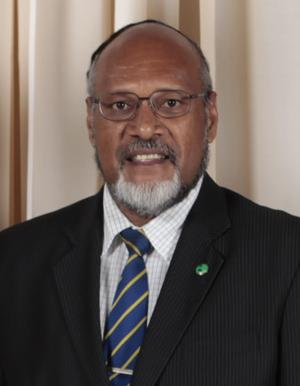
Edward Natapei

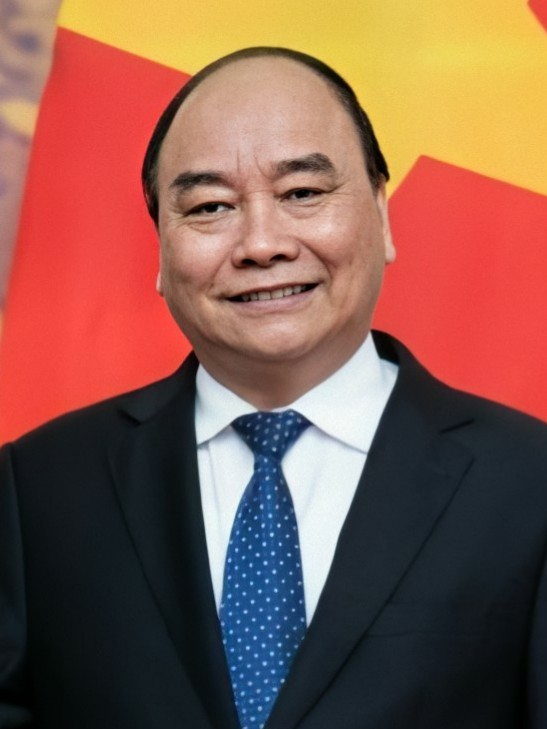
Nguyễn Xuân Phúc

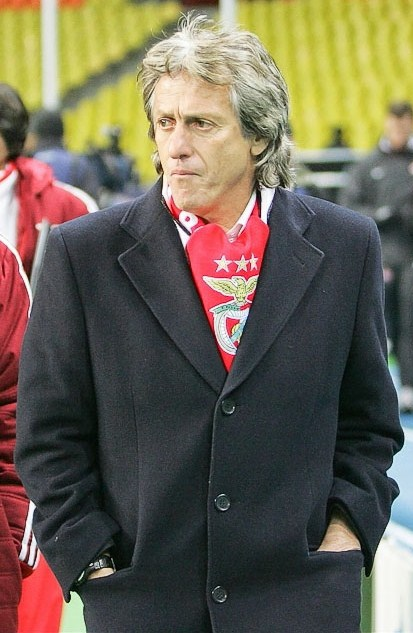
Jorge Jesus

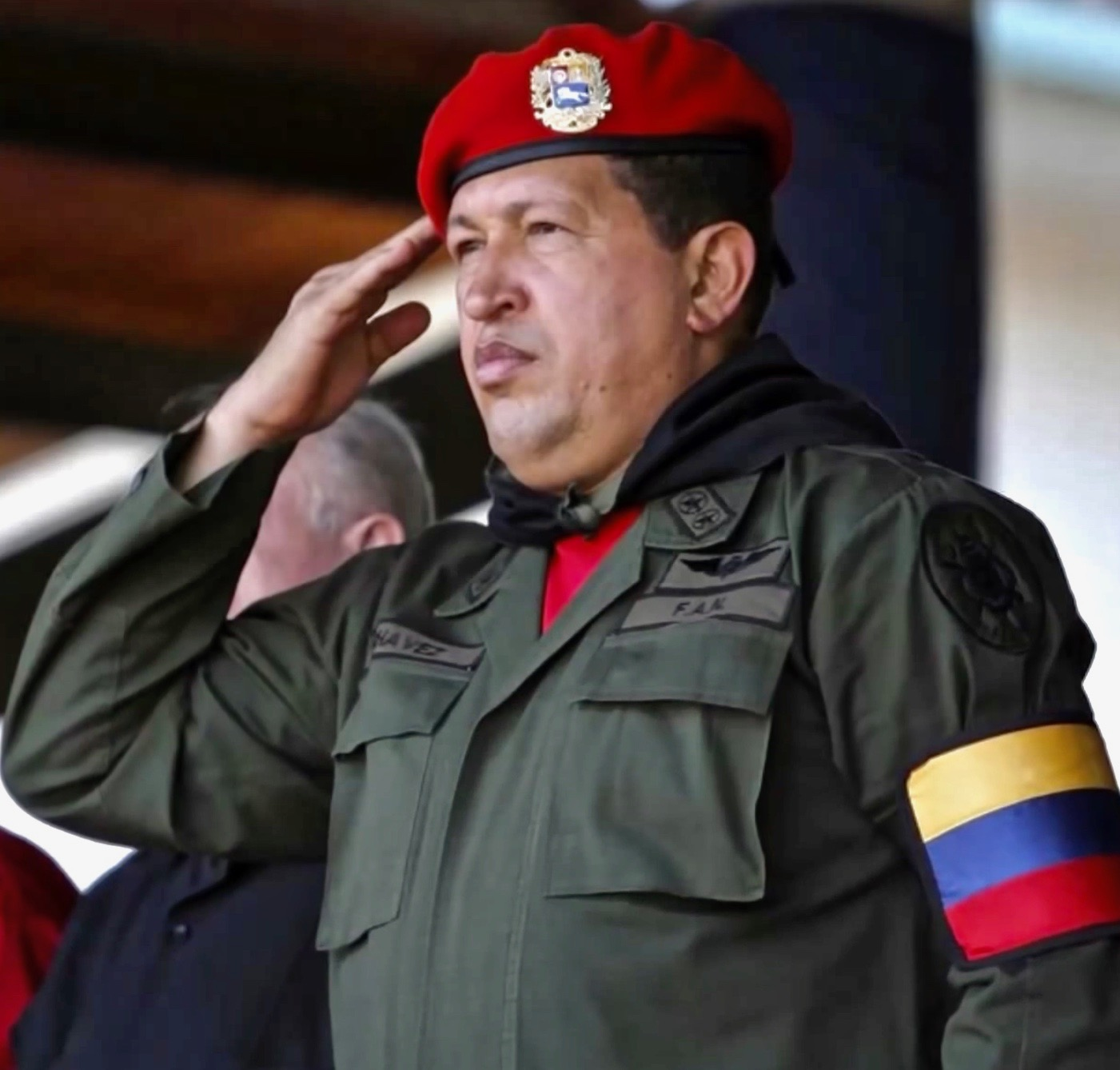
Hugo Chávez

- July 1
  - Sharif Hassan Sheikh Aden, Somali politician
  - Pedro Guastavino, Argentine politician
  - Lawrence Gonzi, Maltese politician and lawyer
- July 2
  - Ludmila Aslanian, Armenian chess player
  - Peter Randall-Page, British artist
  - Wendy Schaal, American actress
- July 3 – Pennie Lane Trumbull, American socialite, philanthropist, businesswoman, and entrepreneur
- July 4 – Anne Lambton, British actress
- July 5
  - Don Stark, American actor
  - John Wright, New Zealand cricket captain
- July 6 – Willie Randolph, American baseball player, coach, manager
- July 7
  - Robert M. Price, American theologian and writer, Cthulhu Mythos scholar and editor
  - Simon Anderson, Australian competitive surfer, surfboard shaper, and writer
  - Ursula Stephens, Australian politician
- July 8
  - David Aaronovitch, English journalist, television presenter and author
  - Matthew Marsh, English actor
- July 9 – Kevin O'Leary, Canadian businessman, television personality, and political candidate
- July 10
  - Andre Dawson, American baseball player
  - Michele Serra, Italian writer, journalist and satirist
  - Neil Tennant, British singer-songwriter, musician and journalist (Pet Shop Boys)
  - Yō Yoshimura, Japanese voice actor (d. 1991)
- July 11 – Alejandro Camacho, Mexican actor and producer
- July 12
  - Lisa Pelikan, American actress
  - Paulo Saldiva, Brazilian professor, physician, pathologist and medical researcher
- July 13 – Sezen Aksu, Turkish singer
- July 15
  - Tarak Dhiab, Tunisian footballer
  - Mario Kempes, Argentine footballer
- July 17
  - Angela Merkel, 8th Chancellor of Germany
  - Richard Bekins, American actor
  - Edward Natapei, Vanuatu politician and Prime Minister of Vanuatu (d. 2015)
  - J. Michael Straczynski, American author
- July 18 – Franziska Troegner, German actress
- July 19 – Verica Kalanović, Serbian politician
- July 20
  - Lo Ta-yu, Taiwanese singer and songwriter
  - Nguyễn Xuân Phúc, Vietnamese politician; 10th President of Vietnam, 7th Prime Minister of Vietnam
- July 21 – Otto Jespersen, Norwegian comedian, actor and television personality
- July 22 – Pierre Lebeau, Canadian actor
- July 24 – Jorge Jesus, Portuguese football player and coach
- July 26
  - Vitas Gerulaitis, American tennis player (d. 1994)
  - Leonardo Daniel, Mexican actor and director
- July 27
  - Philippe Alliot, French racing driver
  - Lynne Frederick, British actress (d. 1994)
- July 28 – Hugo Chávez, President of Venezuela (d. 2013)

=== August ===
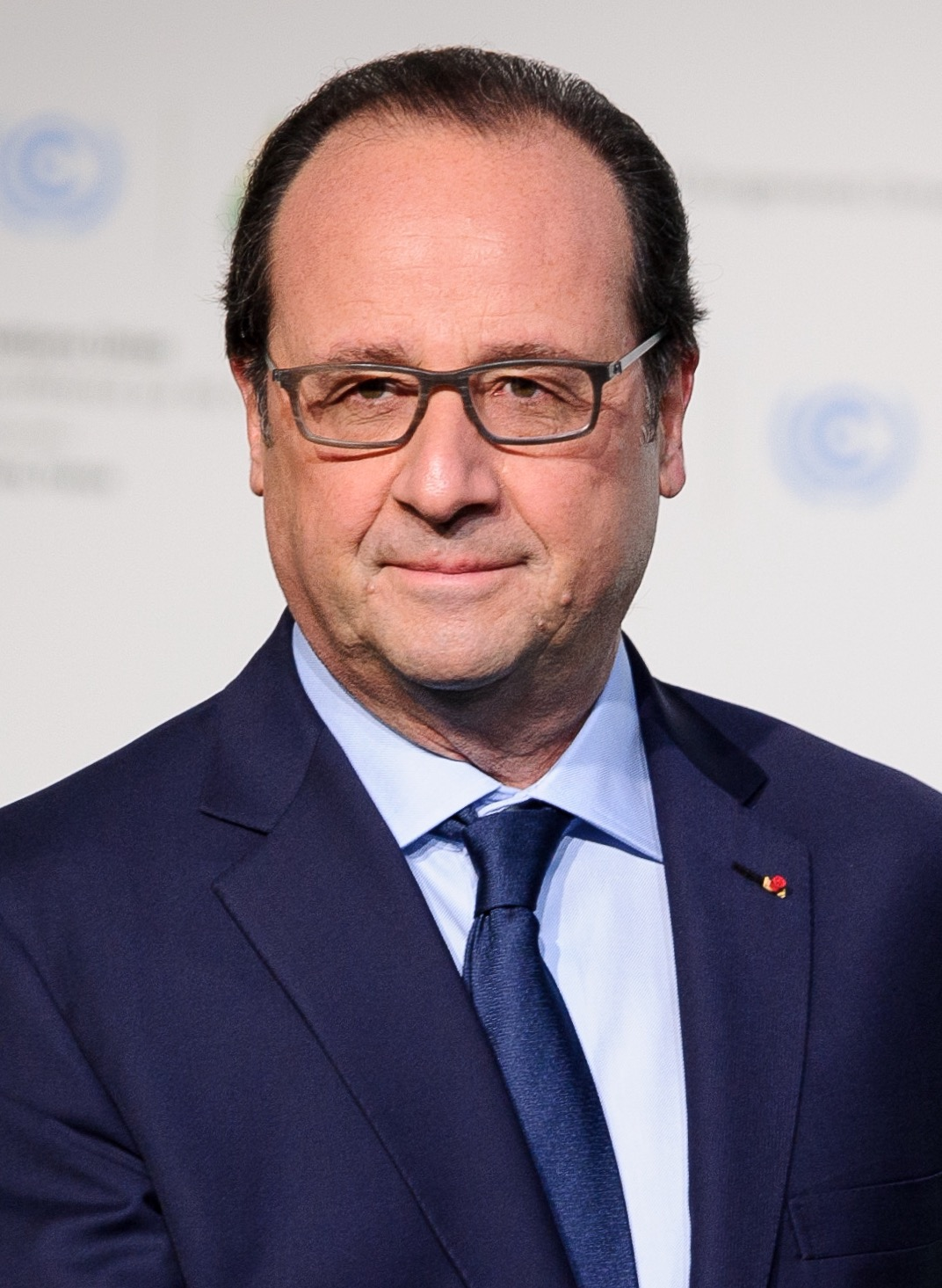
François Hollande

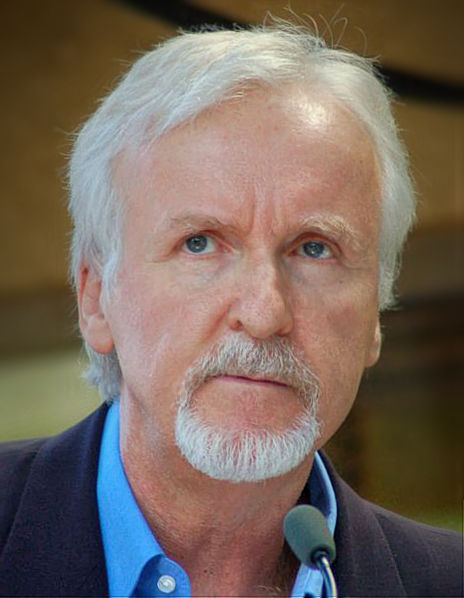
James Cameron

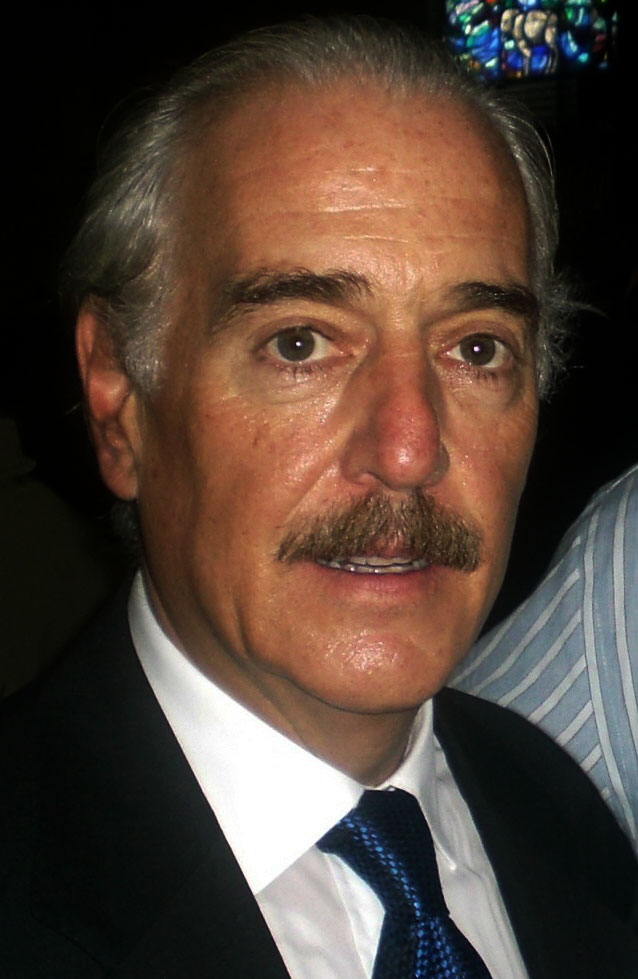
Andrés Pastrana Arango

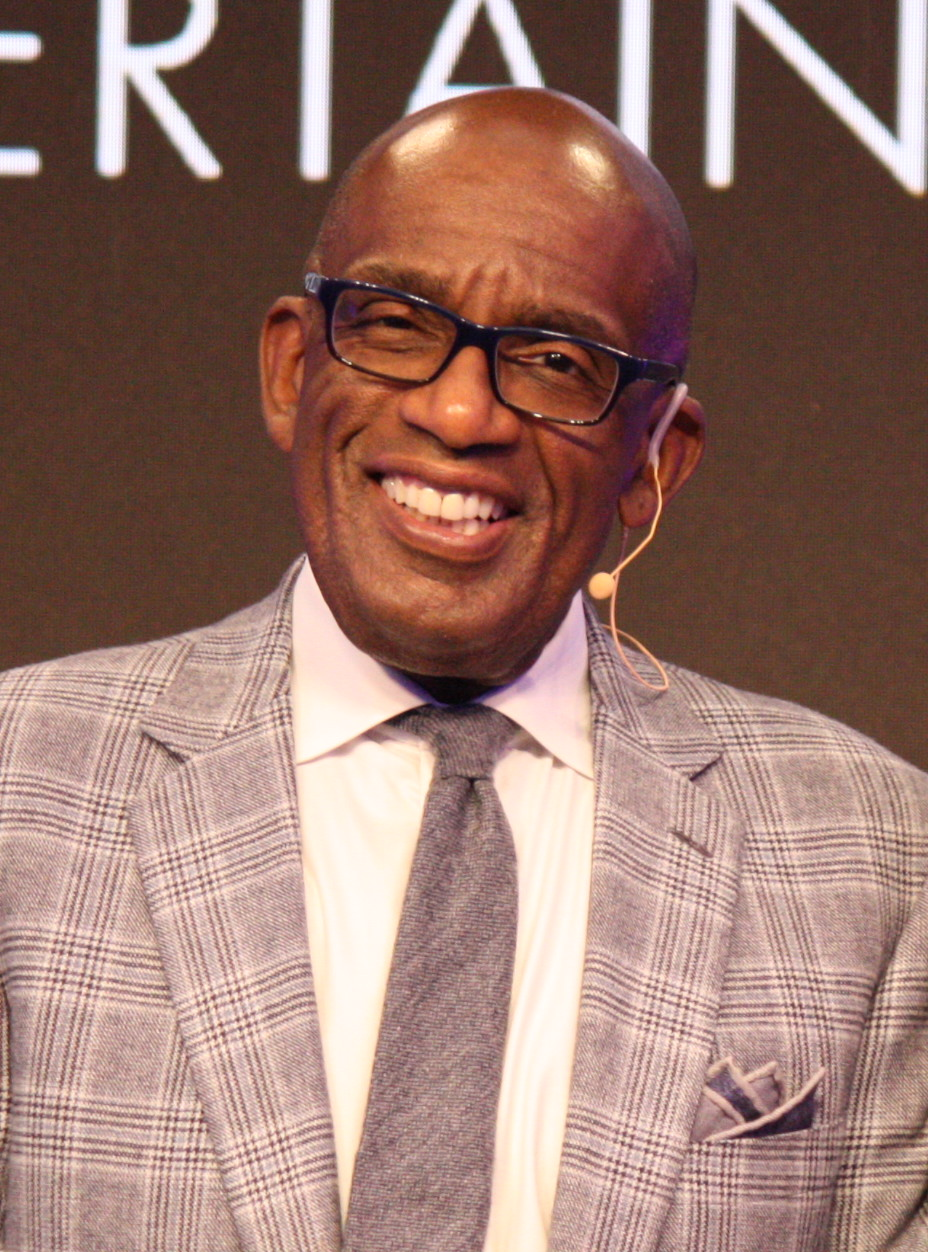
Al Roker

Halimah Yacob

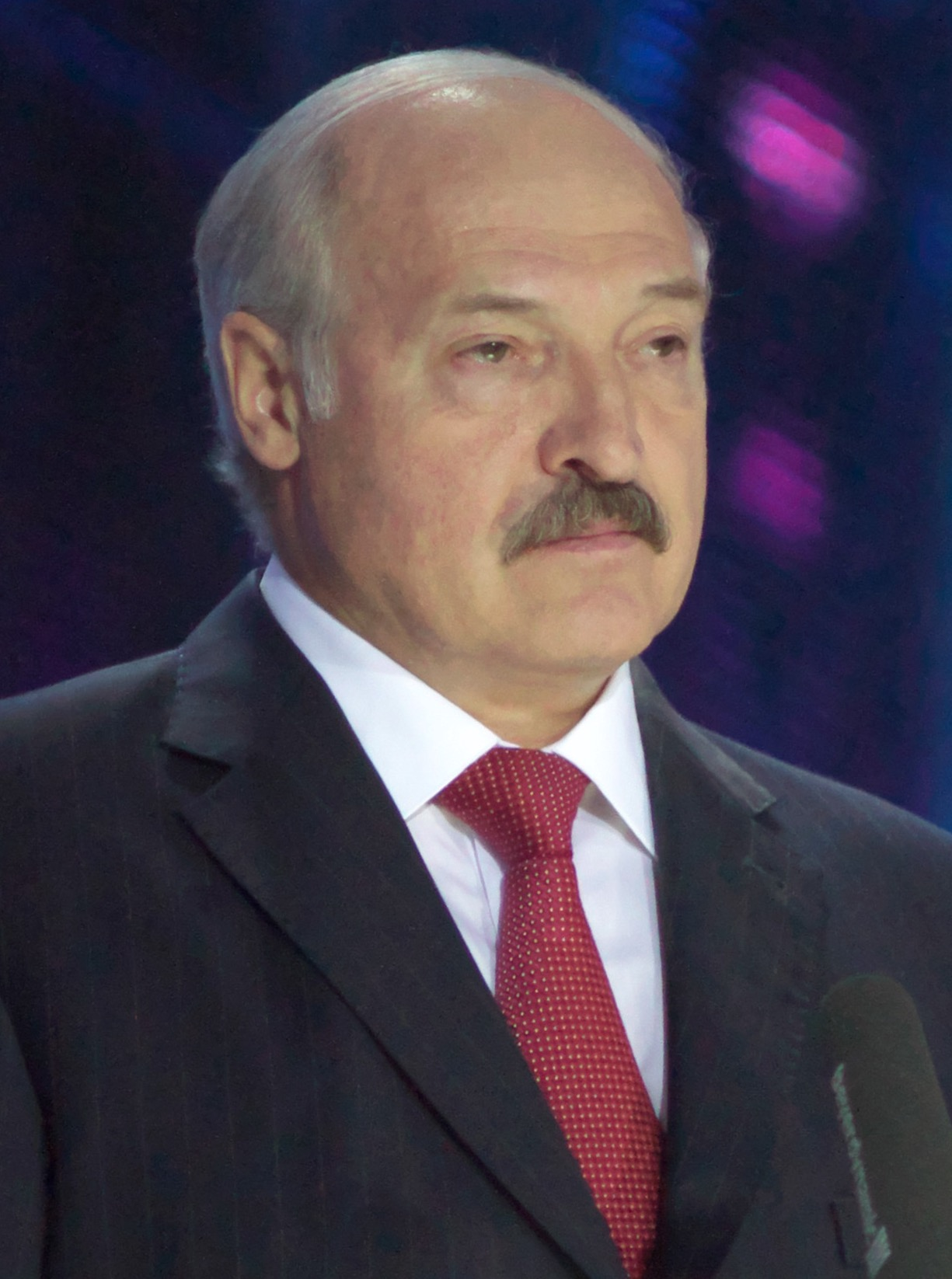
Alexander Lukashenko

- August 1
  - Michael Badnarik, American software engineer and presidential candidate
  - James Gleick, American non fiction author of several award-winning books
  - Junpei Morita, Japanese actor and voice actor
- August 2 – David Tang, Hong Kong-British entrepreneur and philanthropist (d. 2017)
- August 4
  - Dorottya Udvaros, Hungarian actress
  - François Valéry, French singer-songwriter and composer
  - Uwe Wittwer, Swiss artist
- August 7 – Susanna Javicoli, Italian actress (d. 2005)
- August 9 – Pete Thomas, British drummer for the Elvis Costello band
- August 10 – Kim Pyong Il, North Korean diplomat and son of Kim Il Sung
- August 11 – Joe Jackson, British singer-songwriter (Steppin' Out)
- August 12
  - François Hollande, President of France 2012–17
  - Sam J. Jones, American actor
  - Pat Metheny, American jazz guitarist
- August 13
  - Nico Assumpção, Brazilian bass guitar player (d. 2001)
  - Tõnu Kilgas, Estonian singer and actor
- August 14
  - Mark Fidrych, American baseball player (d. 2009)
  - Stanley A. McChrystal, U.S. Army general
- August 16 – James Cameron, Canadian-born film director
- August 17
  - Anatoly Kudryavitsky, Russian-Irish writer
  - Andrés Pastrana Arango, President of Colombia
- August 20
  - Tawn Mastrey, American disc jockey and music video producer (d. 2007)
  - Al Roker, American television personality and host
  - Richarda Schmeisser, East German artistic gymnast
- August 23
  - Ian Bartholomew, English actor
  - Charles Busch, American director, writer and actor
  - Halimah Yacob, 8th president of Singapore
- August 24
  - Joe Ochman, American actor and voice actor
  - Philippe Cataldo, French singer
- August 25
  - Bruno Manser, Swiss environmental activist (d. 2005)
  - Elvis Costello, English singer-songwriter
- August 29 – István Cserháti, Hungarian keyboardist (d. 2005)
- August 30 – Alexander Lukashenko, President of Belarus
- August 31
  - Robert Kocharyan, President of Armenia
  - Caroline Cossey, British model

=== September ===
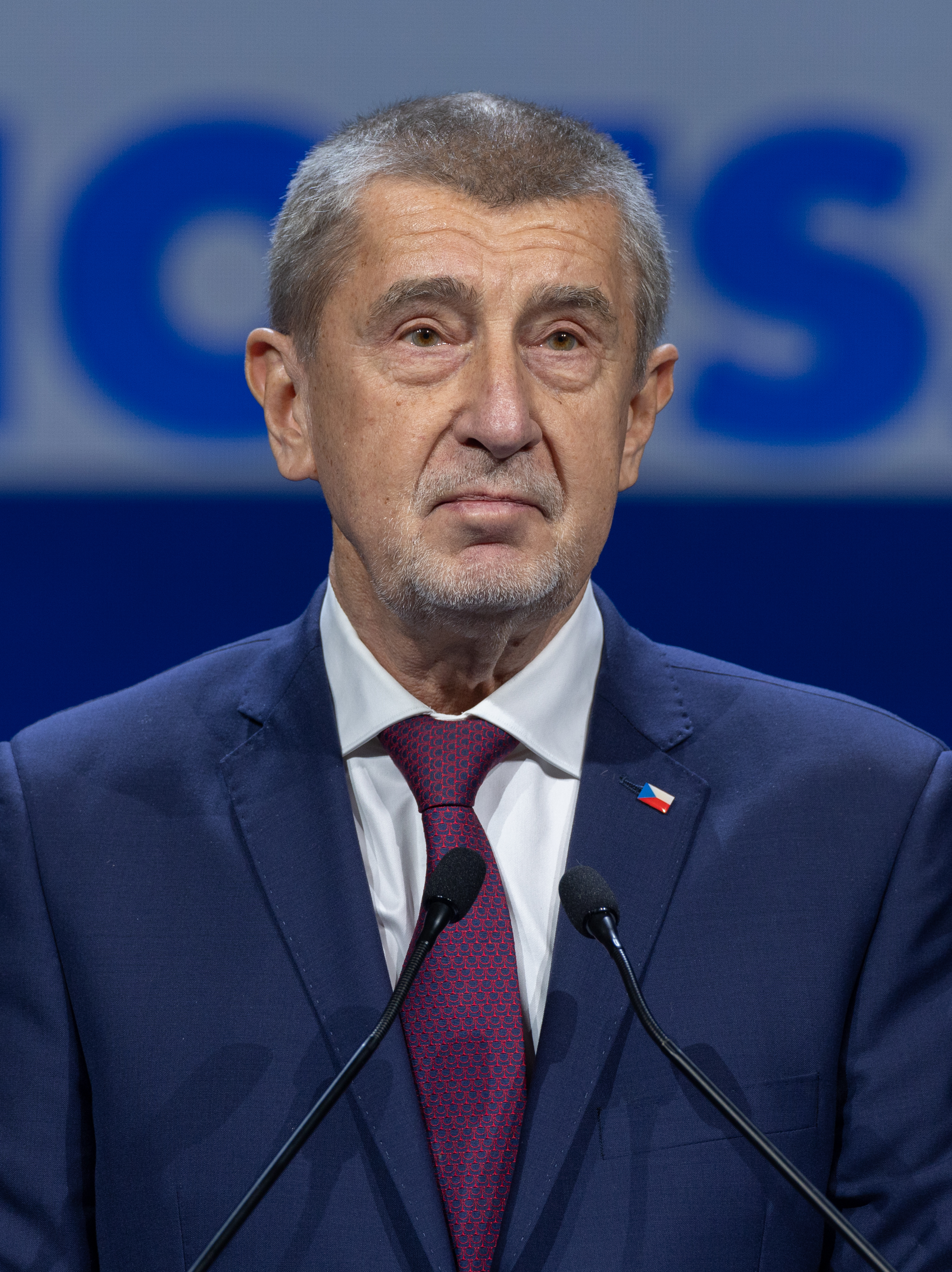
Andrej Babiš

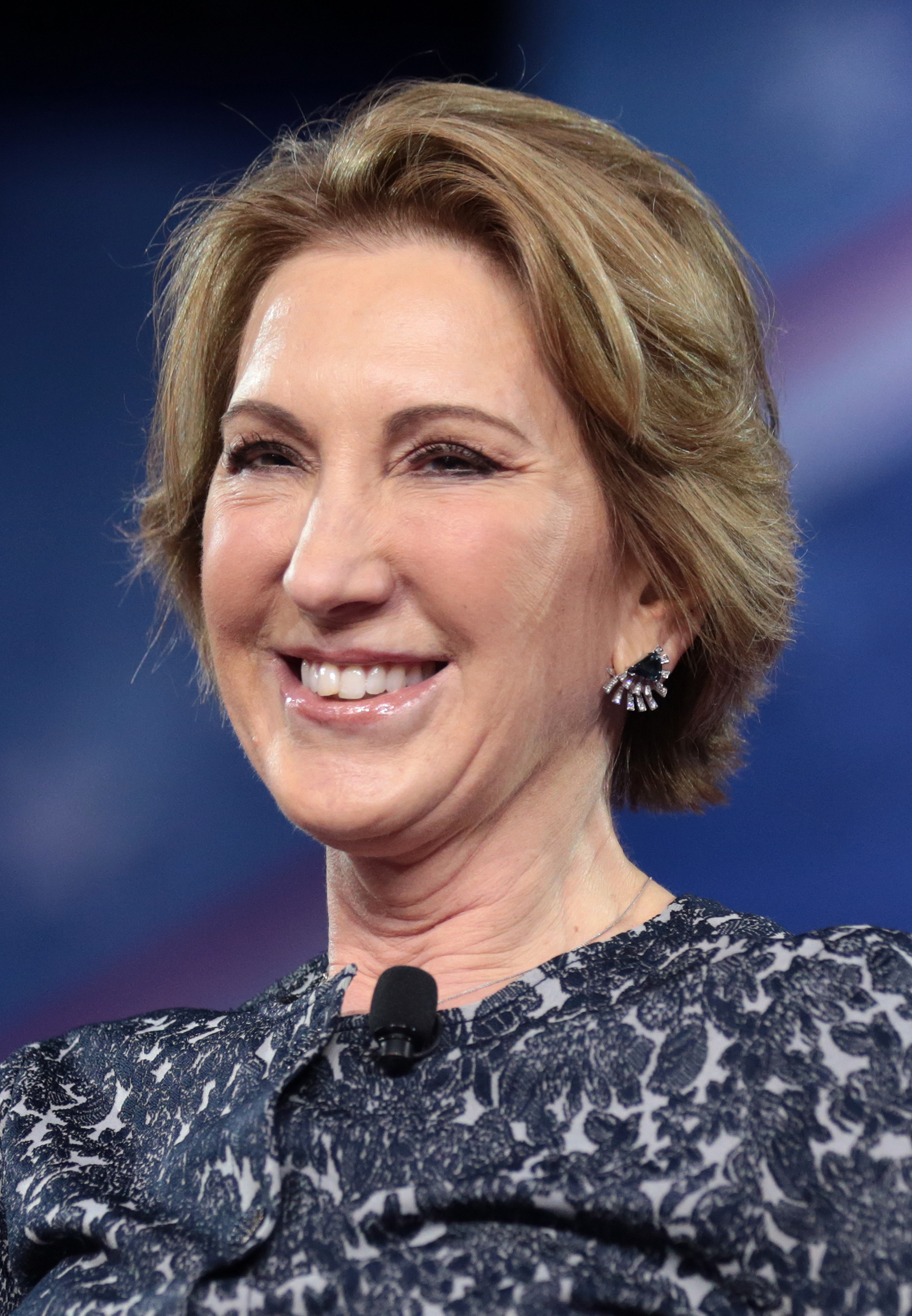
Carly Fiorina

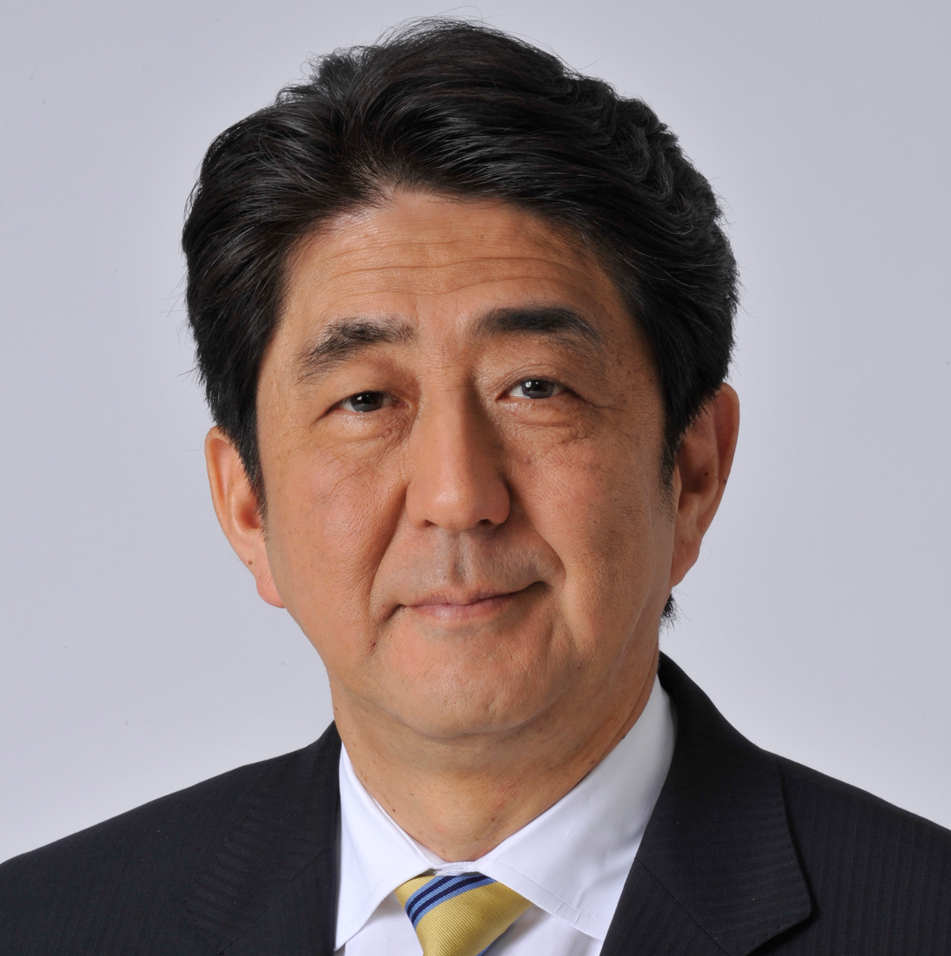
Shinzō Abe

-

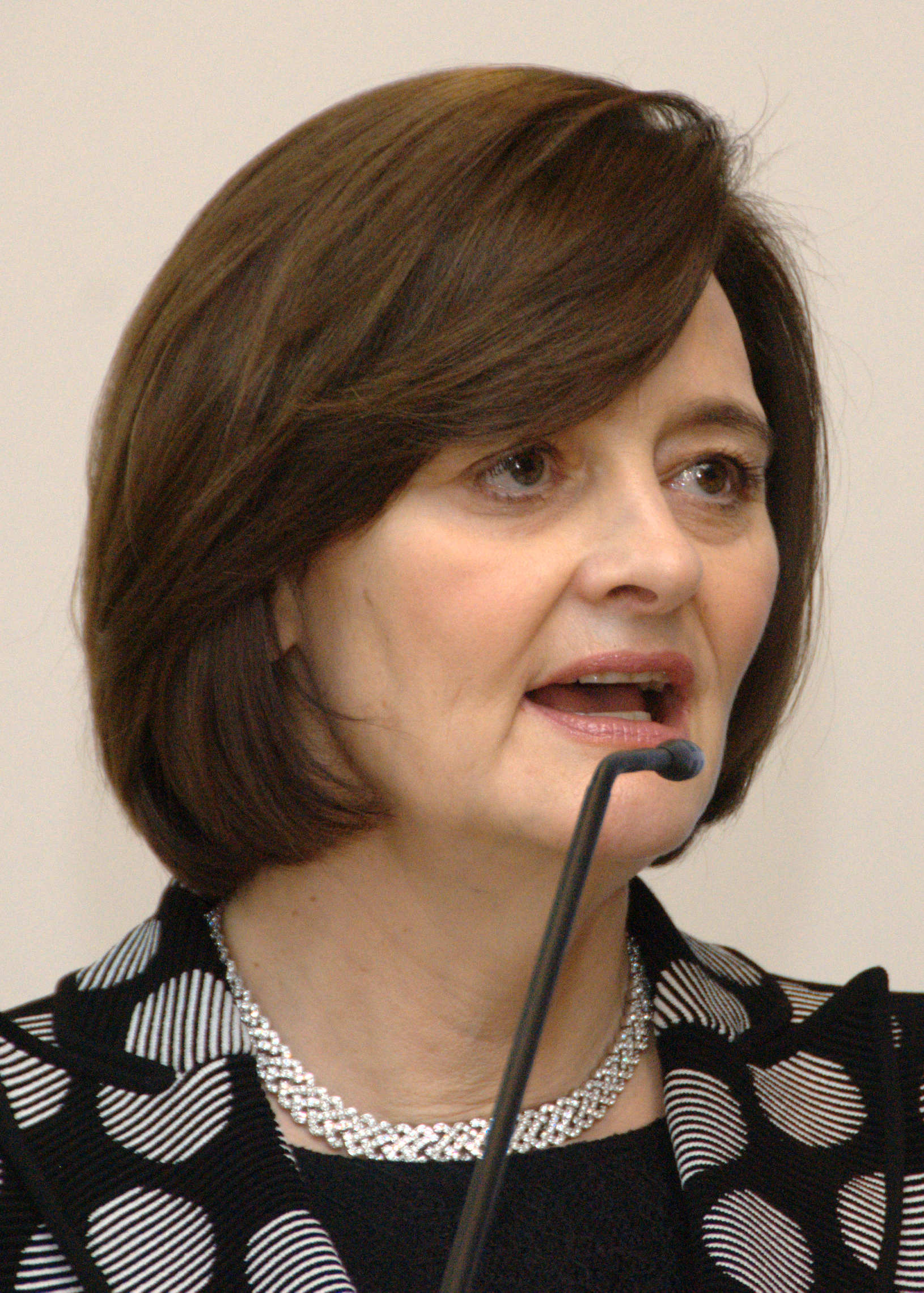
Cherie Blair

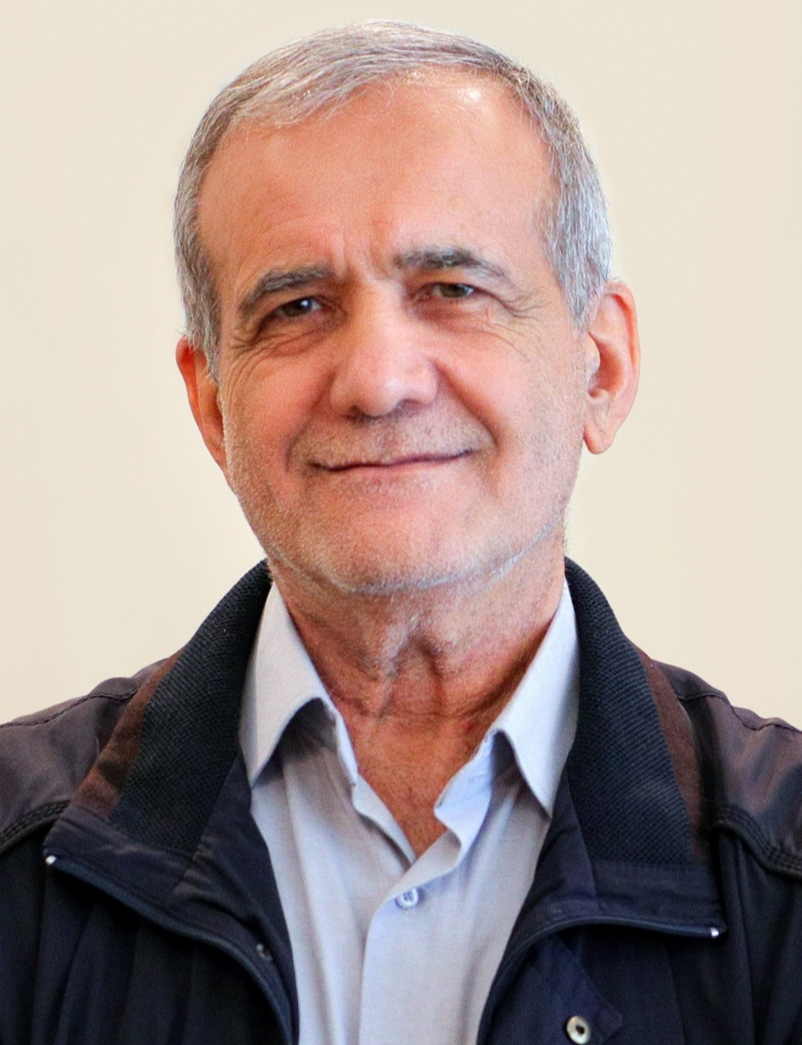
Masoud Pezeshkian

- September 1 – Dave Lumley, Canadian ice hockey player
- September 2
  - Andrej Babiš, Czech entrepreneur and politician, 12th Prime Minister of the Czech Republic
  - Vance DeGeneres, American actor
  - Zeta Emilianidou, Cypriot lawyer and politician (d. 2022)
  - Gai Waterhouse, Australian racehorse trainer
  - Humberto Zurita, Mexican actor, director and producer
- September 6 – Carly Fiorina, American businesswoman, CEO of HP (1999–2005) and Senator Ted Cruz's running mate in the 2016 presidential election
- September 7
  - Corbin Bernsen, American actor
  - Michael Emerson, American actor
  - Francisco Guterres, 4th president of East Timor (d. 2026)
- September 9 – Mohsen Rezaee, Iranian politician
- September 10 – Mark W. Everson, American businessman; 46th Commissioner of the Internal Revenue Service (2003–07)
- September 13 – Steve Kilbey, English born Australian musician and artist
- September 15 – Nava Semel, Israeli author and playwright (d. 2017)
- September 16 – Ashrita Furman, American record breaker
- September 18
  - Dennis Johnson, American basketball player (d. 2007)
  - Philip J. Pierre, prime minister of St Lucia
  - Steven Pinker, Canadian-American psychologist and author
  - Tommy Tuberville, US Senator
- September 21
  - Shinzō Abe, Prime Minister of Japan (d. 2022)
  - Julia Grant, British transgender activist (d. 2019)
  - Thomas S. Ray, American ecologist
  - Phil "Philthy Animal" Taylor, English drummer (Motörhead and Waysted) (d. 2015)
- September 23 – Cherie Blair, lawyer, wife of British Prime Minister Tony Blair
- September 24 – Lilian Mercedes Letona, Salvadoran guerrilla (d. 1983)
- September 26 – Kevin Kennedy, American baseball manager and television host
- September 28
  - Steve Largent, American football player and congressman
  - Margot Wallström, Swedish politician
- September 29 – Masoud Pezeshkian, President of Iran
- September 30 – Barry Williams, American actor

=== October ===
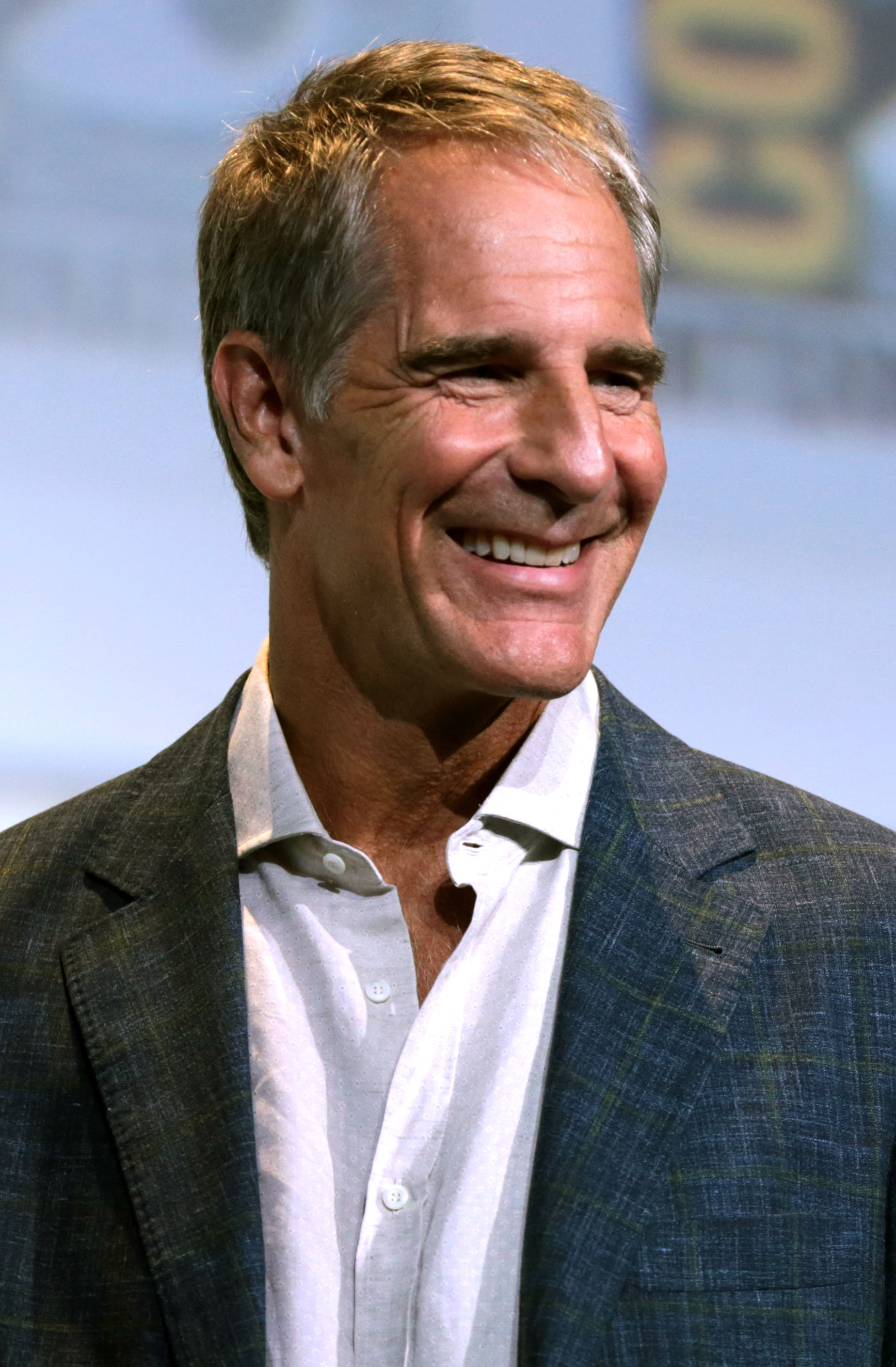
Scott Bakula

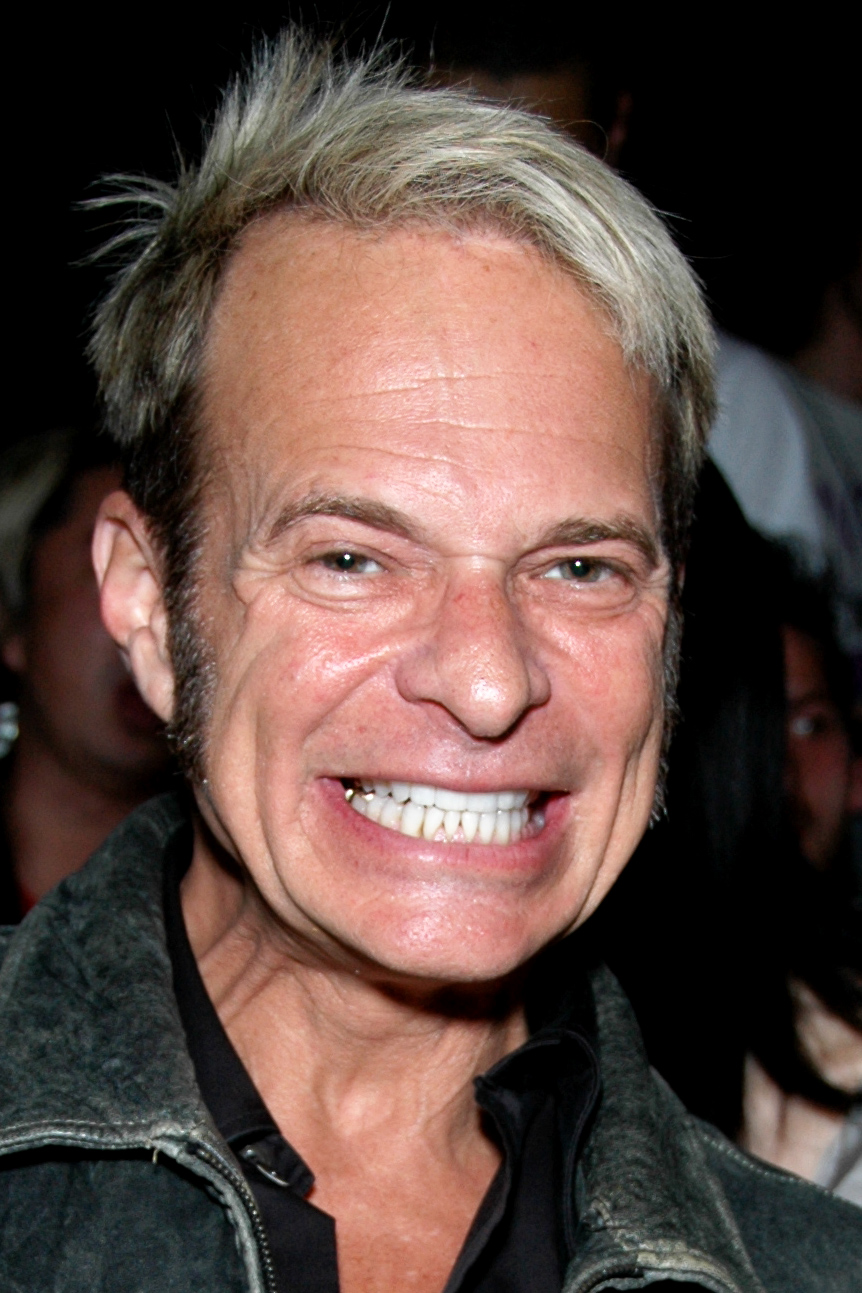
David Lee Roth

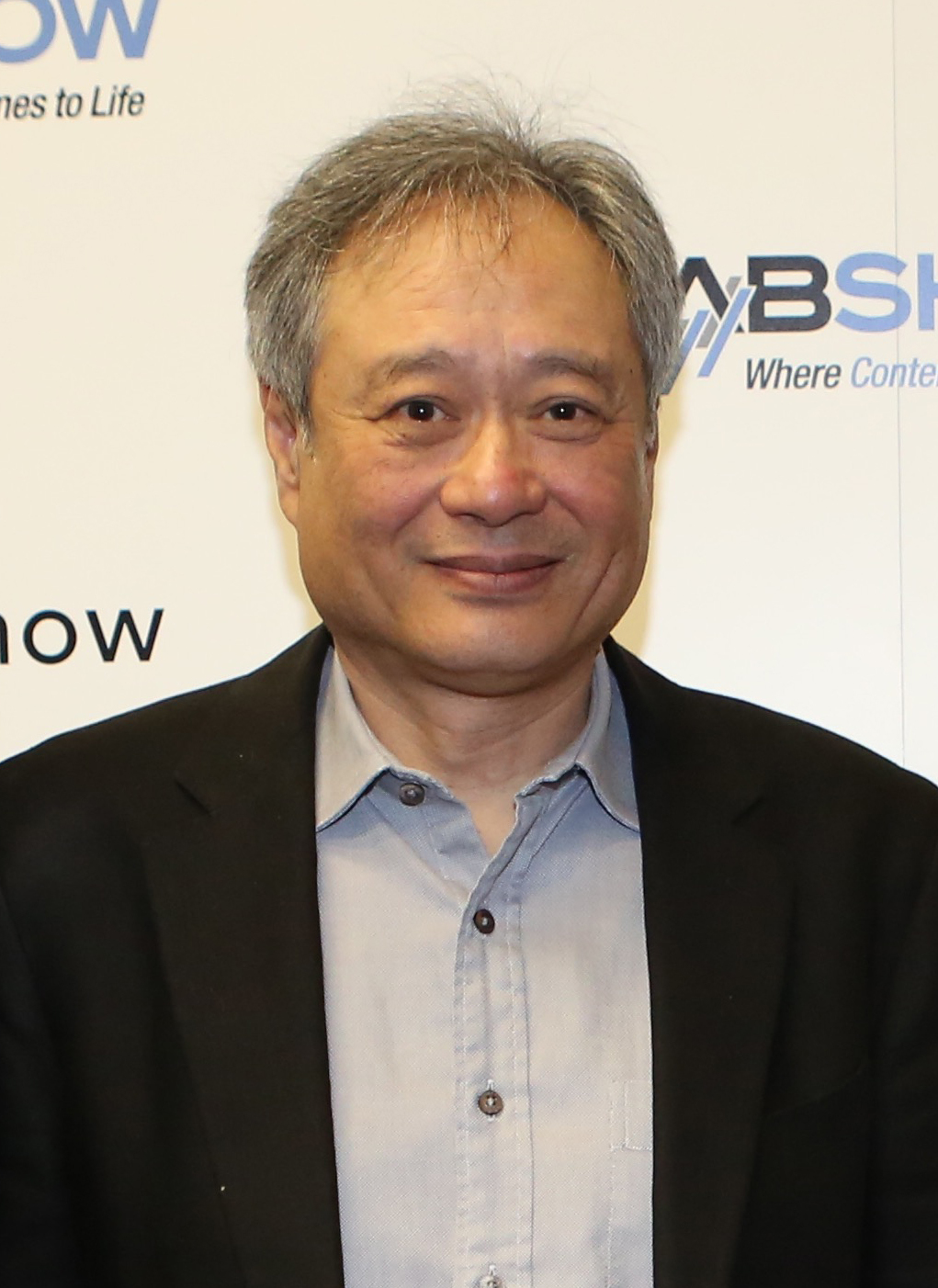
Ang Lee

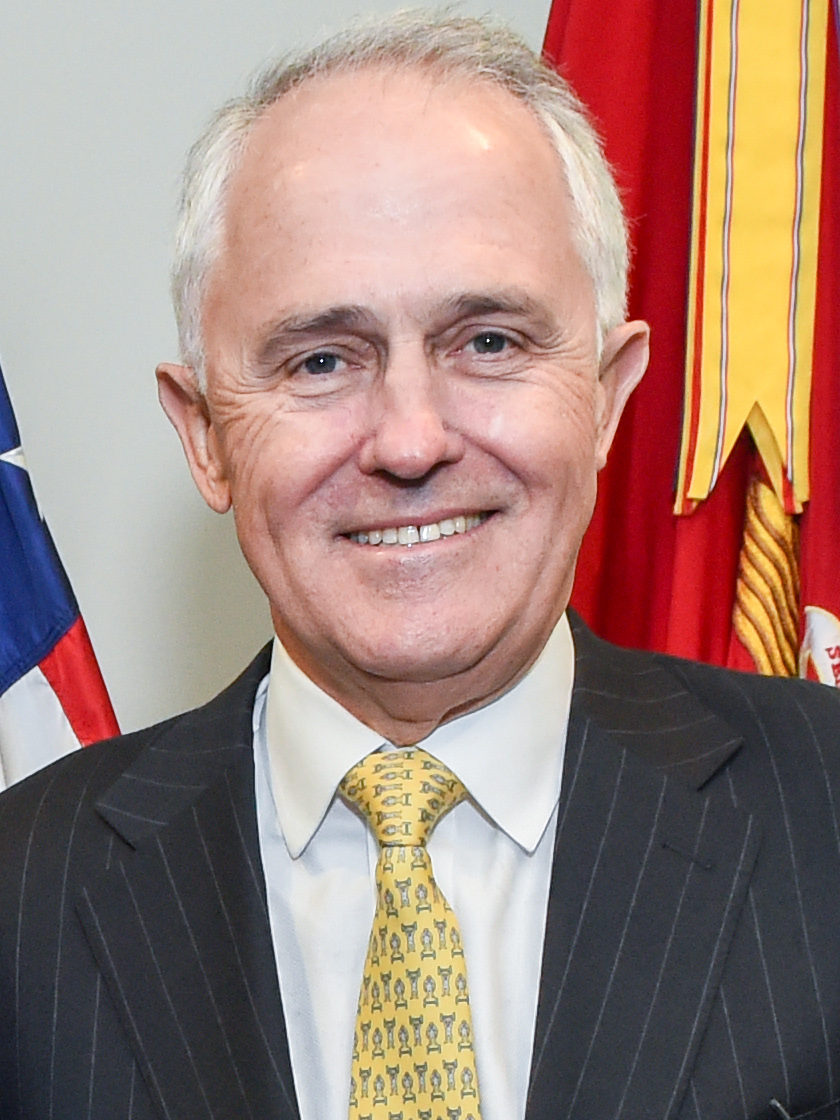
Malcolm Turnbull

- October 1 – Martin Strel, Slovenian swimmer
- October 3
  - Eddie DeGarmo, American Christian keyboardist and producer
  - Dennis Eckersley, American baseball player
  - Al Sharpton, African-American civil rights activist, minister and radio talk show host
  - Dawayne Bailey, American musician
  - Stevie Ray Vaughan, American musician (d. 1990)
- October 5
  - Gurudas Kamat, Indian politician (d. 2018)
  - Wayne Watson, American Christian musician
- October 6 – Howard Hoffman, American voice actor
- October 7 – Robert A. Schuller, American televangelist and the son of Robert Schuller
- October 9
  - Scott Bakula, American actor (Quantum Leap, Star Trek: Enterprise)
  - John O'Hurley, American actor and game show host
- October 10
  - Mohamed Mounir, Egyptian singer and actor
  - David Lee Roth, American rock singer
- October 11 - Vojislav Seselj, former deputy prime minister of Serbia
- October 13 – Mordechai Vanunu, a former Israeli nuclear technician who revealed secrets of its nuclear weapons program
- October 14 – Mohamad Sabu, Malaysian politician
- October 15 – Peter Bakowski, Australian poet
- October 18 – Yūji Mitsuya, Japanese voice actor
- October 22 – Ellen Gerstell, American voice actress
- October 23 – Ang Lee, Taiwanese film director
- October 24
  - Doug Davidson, American actor
  - Mike Rounds, South Dakota politician
  - Malcolm Turnbull, 29th Prime Minister of Australia
- October 26
  - Carlos Agostinho do Rosário, Mozambican politician
  - Victor Ciorbea, 56th prime minister of Romania
- October 30
  - Kathleen Cody, American actress
  - Mario Testino, Peruvian photographer

=== November ===
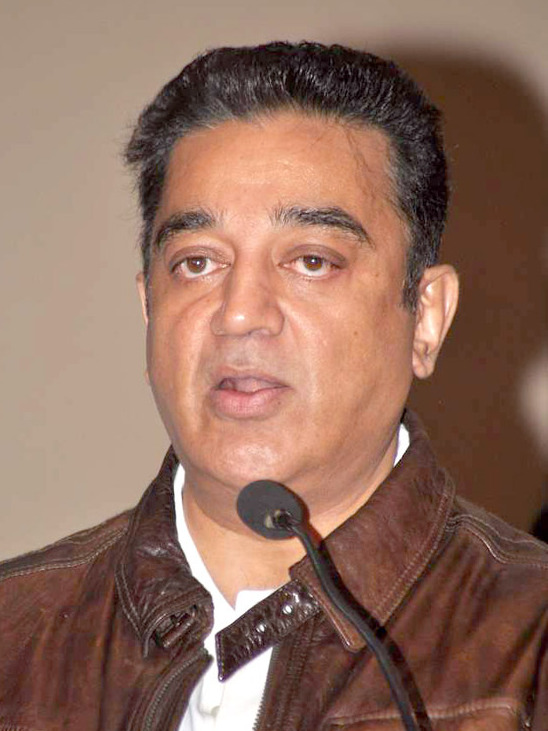
Kamal Haasan

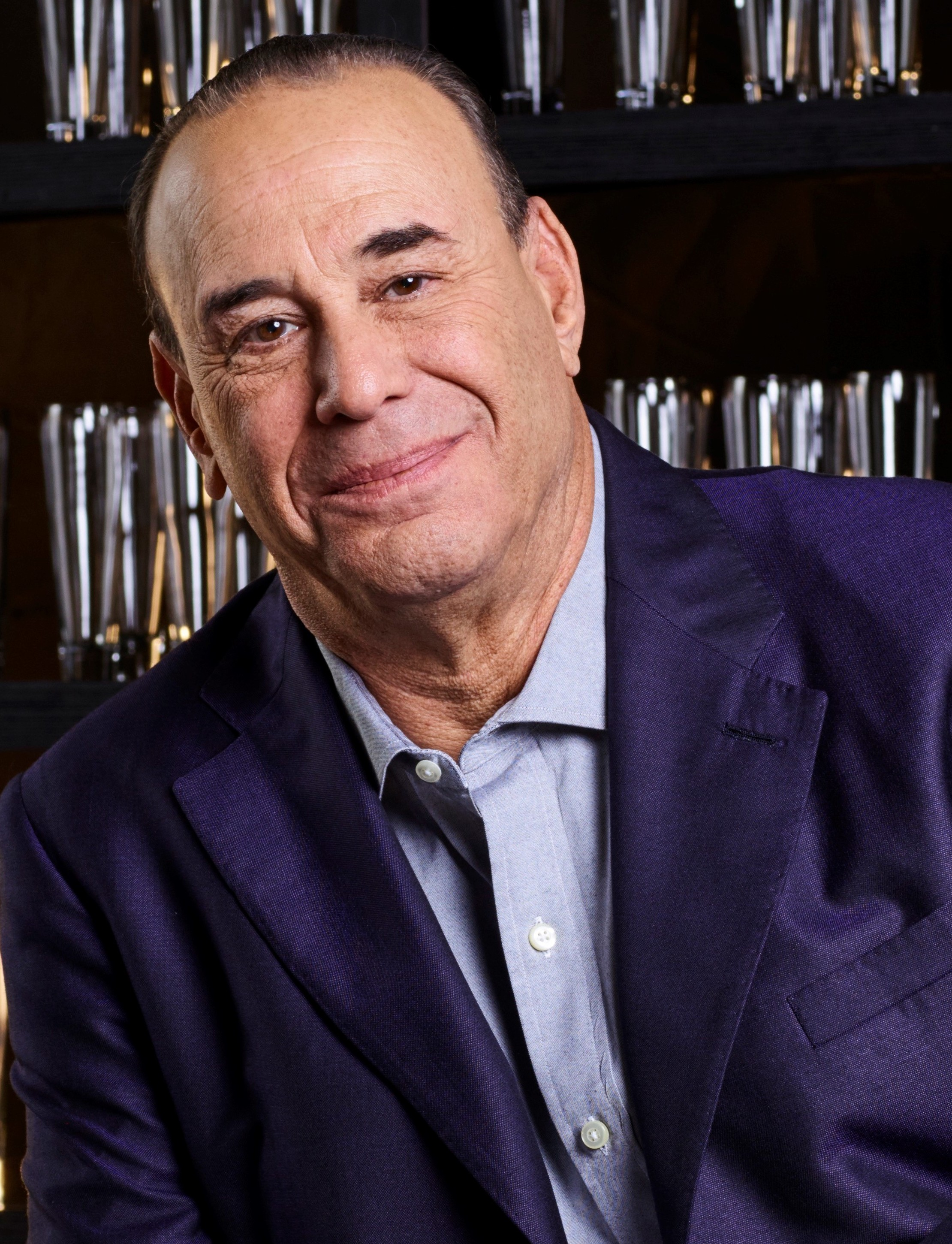
Jon Taffer

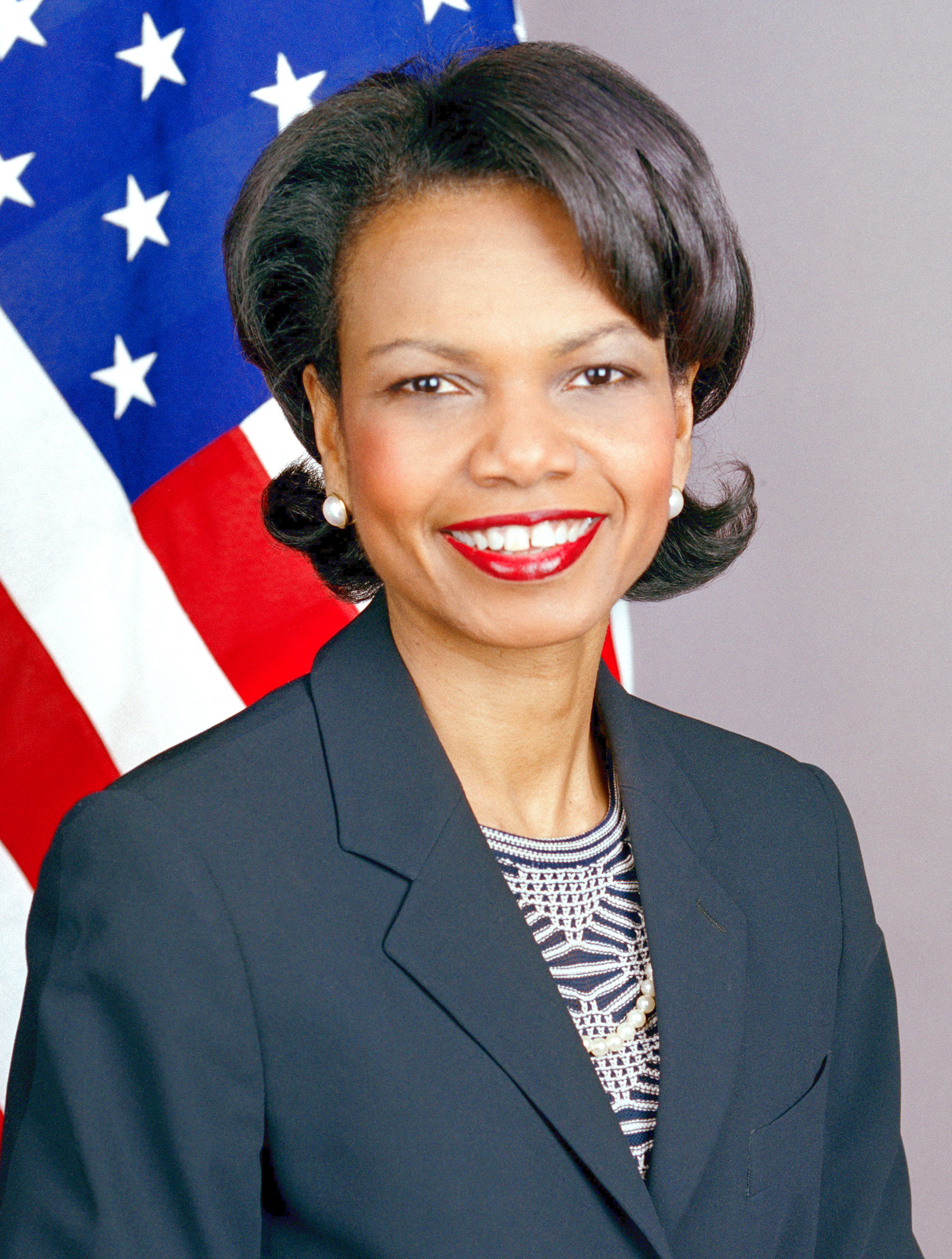
Condoleezza Rice

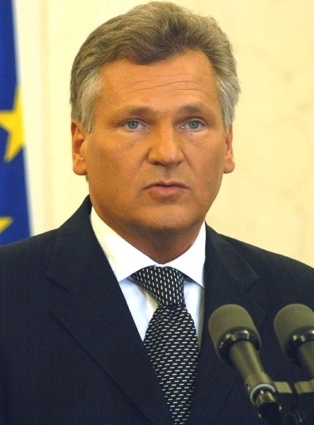
Aleksander Kwaśniewski

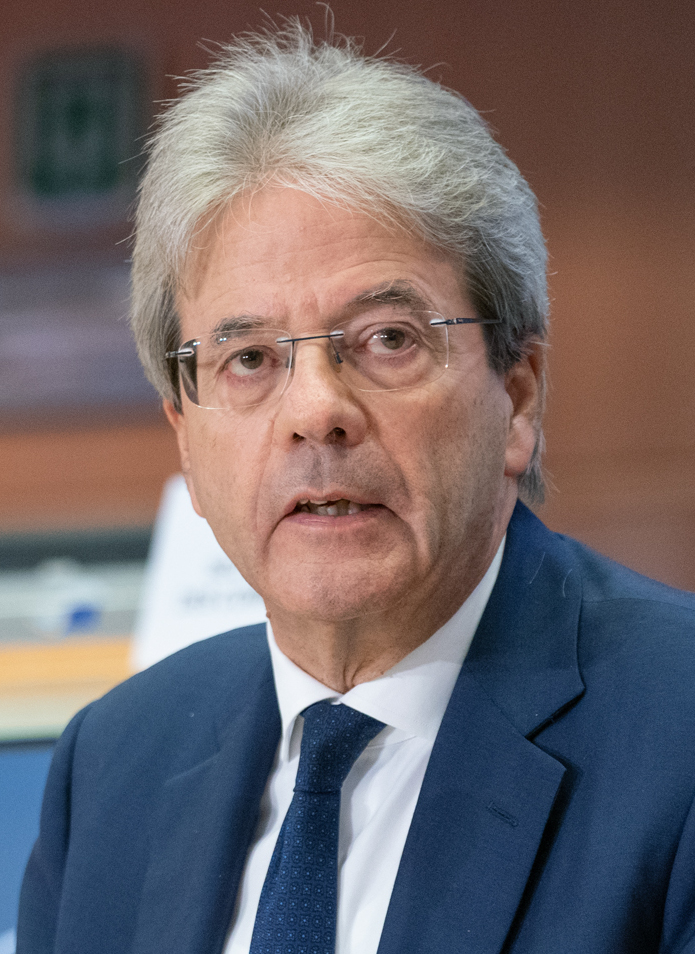
Paolo Gentiloni

- November 2 – Angela Webber, Australian author, television writer, producer and comedian (d. 2007)
- November 3
  - Adam Ant, British rock singer and musician
  - Brigitte Lin, Taiwanese actress
  - Kathy Kinney, American actress and comedian
- November 5
  - Mike Gabriel, American animator and film producer
  - Alejandro Sabella, Argentine footballer and manager (d. 2020)
- November 6 – Karin Fossum, Norwegian crime fiction writer
- November 7
  - Robin Beck, American singer
  - Kamal Haasan, Indian actor, dancer, film director, screenwriter, producer and politician
  - Jon Taffer, American bar consultant, television host and author
- November 8
  - Michael D. Brown, first Undersecretary of Emergency Preparedness and Response, a division of the United States' Department of Homeland Security
  - Kazuo Ishiguro, Japanese-born British author, Nobel Prize laureate
- November 11 – Mary Gaitskill, American novelist
- November 12 – Rhonda Shear, American television hostess, actress and comedian
- November 13 – Chris Noth, American actor
- November 14
  - Yanni, Greek musician
  - Robert Alberts, Dutch footballer and manager of Persib Bandung
  - Willie Hernández, Puerto Rican Major League Baseball player
  - Bernard Hinault, French road bicycle racer
  - Condoleezza Rice, American politician, 66th United States Secretary of State
- November 15
  - Stephen W. Burns, American actor (d. 1990)
  - Aleksander Kwaśniewski, President of Poland
- November 16 – Bruce Edwards, American golf caddy (d. 2004)
- November 19
  - Abdel Fattah el-Sisi, President of Egypt
  - Kathleen Quinlan, American actress
- November 22 – Paolo Gentiloni, Prime Minister of Italy
- November 23
  - Bruce Hornsby, American rock singer
  - Elizabeth Savalla, Brazilian actress
- November 26
  - Roz Chast, American cartoonist
- November 27
  - Patricia McPherson, American actress
  - Kimmy Robertson, American actress
- November 28 – Marty Grabstein, American actor and voice actor
- November 29 – Joel Coen, American film director, producer, screenwriter and editor
- November 30 – Lawrence Summers, US economist, 71st US Treasury Secretary
- November – Pierre M'Pelé, African public health personality and writer

=== December ===
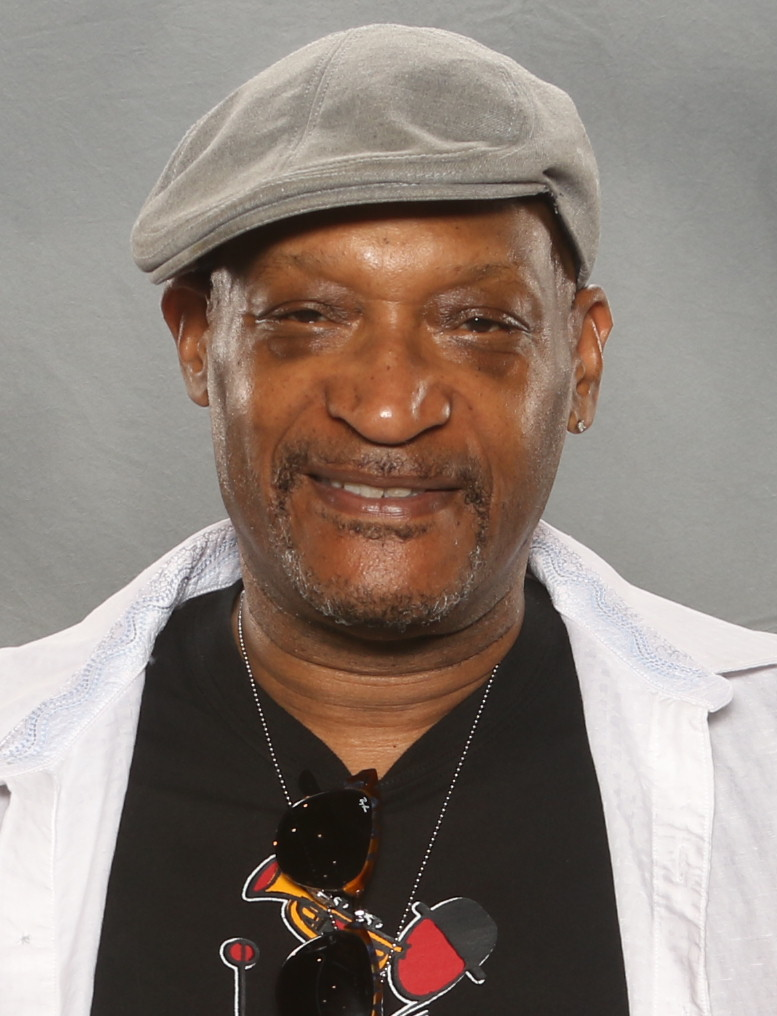
Tony Todd

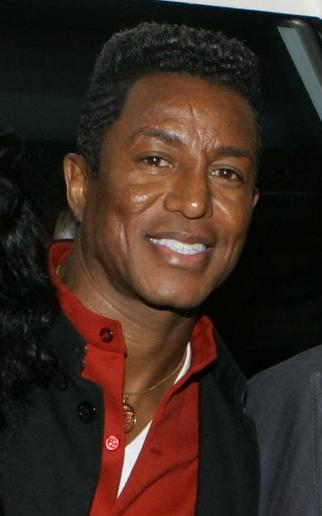
Jermaine Jackson

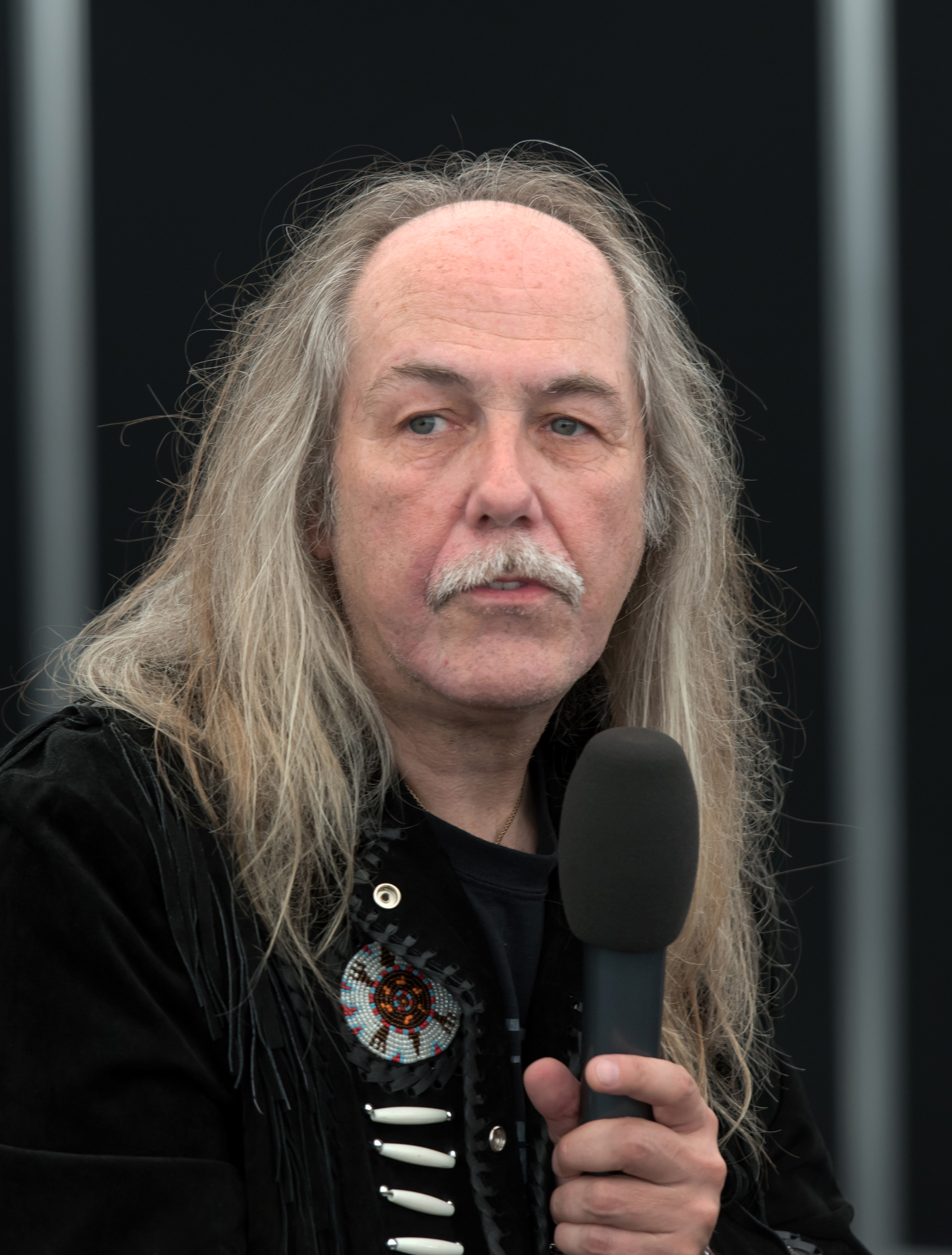
Uli Jon Roth

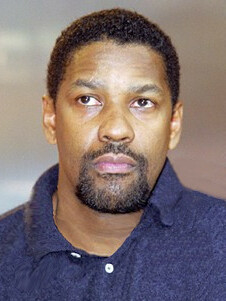
Denzel Washington

- December 2 – Dan Butler, American actor and voice actor
- December 4 – Tony Todd, American actor and producer (d. 2024)
- December 6 – Beat Furrer, Swiss-born Austrian composer and conductor
- December 8 – Sumi Shimamoto, Japanese voice actress
- December 9 – Jean-Claude Juncker, Luxembourg politician
- December 11
  - Sylvester Clarke, West Indian cricketer (d. 1999)
  - Elizângela, Brazilian actress (d. 2023)
  - Peter Hegemann, German biophysicist, Nobel Prize laureate
  - Jermaine Jackson, African-American singer and actor
  - Prachanda, Nepalese Communist leader
- December 13 – John Anderson, American country music singer-songwriter (d. 2026)
- December 14
  - Ib Andersen, Danish dancer
  - Alan Kulwicki, American race car driver (d. 1993)
- December 15 – Mark Warner, American politician
- December 18 – Ray Liotta, American actor and producer (Goodfellas) (d. 2022)
- December 20
  - Sandra Cisneros, American writer
  - Binali Yildirim, Prime Minister of Turkey
- December 21 – Chris Evert, American tennis player
- December 23 – Brian Teacher, American tennis player
- December 24 – José María Figueres, Costa Rican politician, President (1994–1998)
- December 25
  - Roman Baskin, Estonian actor and director of stage and screen (d. 2018)
  - Annie Lennox, British pop musician and lead singer of Eurythmics
- December 26
  - Hajji Alejandro, Filipino singer and actor (d. 2025)
  - Susan Butcher, American dog-sled racer (d. 2006)
  - Ozzie Smith, HOF baseball shortstop
- December 28
  - Tony Ables, American serial killer and robber
  - Lanny Poffo, American professional wrestler (d. 2023)
  - Denzel Washington, African-American actor
- December 29
  - Albrecht Böttcher, German mathematician
  - Roger Voudouris, American singer-songwriter and guitarist (d. 2003)
- December 31 – Alex Salmond, Scottish politician (d. 2024)

=== Date not known ===
- Marek Smurzyński, Polish translator, Persian language speaker and translator (d. 2009)

== Deaths ==
=== January ===
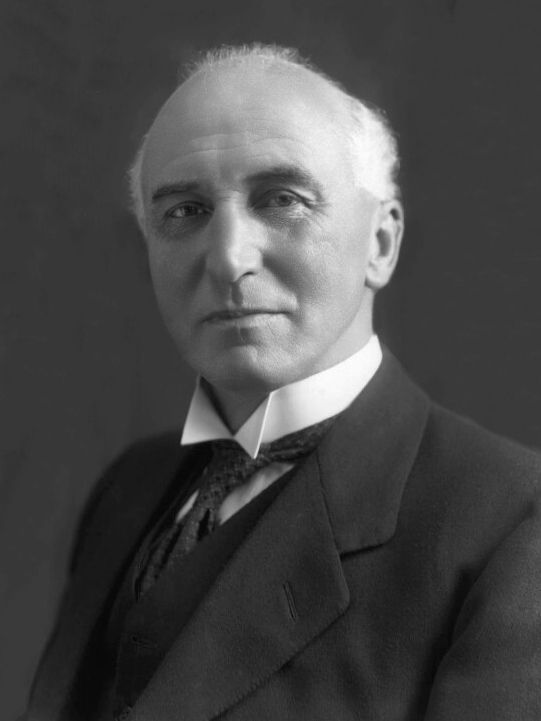
John Simon, 1st Viscount Simon

- January 1 – José Millán-Astray, Spanish general, founder of the Spanish Legion (b. 1879)
- January 5 – Lillian Rich, English actress (b. 1900)
- January 8 – Eduard Wiiralt, Estonian artist (b. 1898)
- January 11
  - John Simon, 1st Viscount Simon, British politician (b. 1873)
  - Oscar Straus, Austrian composer (b. 1870)
- January 18 – Sydney Greenstreet, English actor (b. 1879)
- January 31 - Florence Bates, American actress (b. 1888)

=== February ===
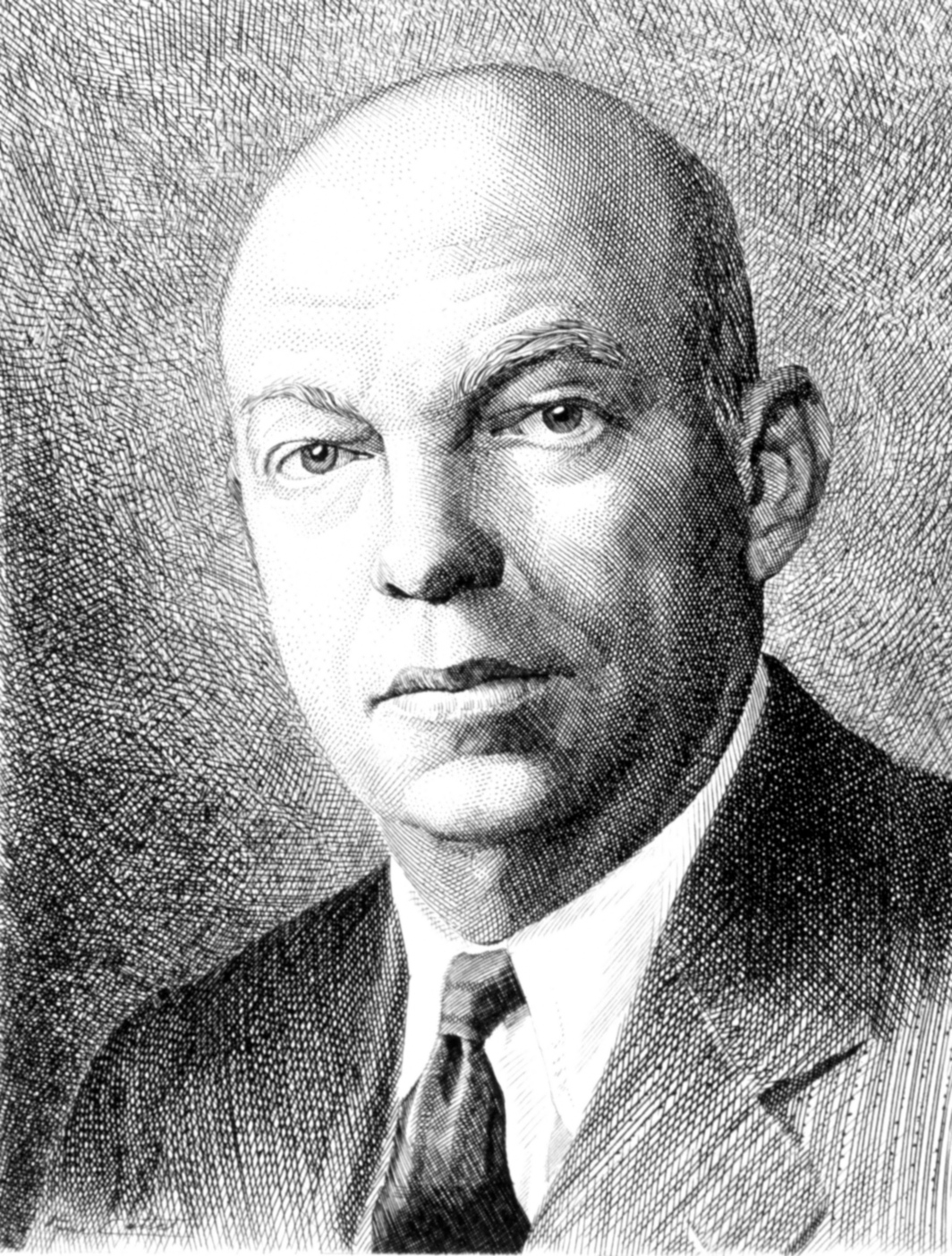
Edwin Howard Armstrong

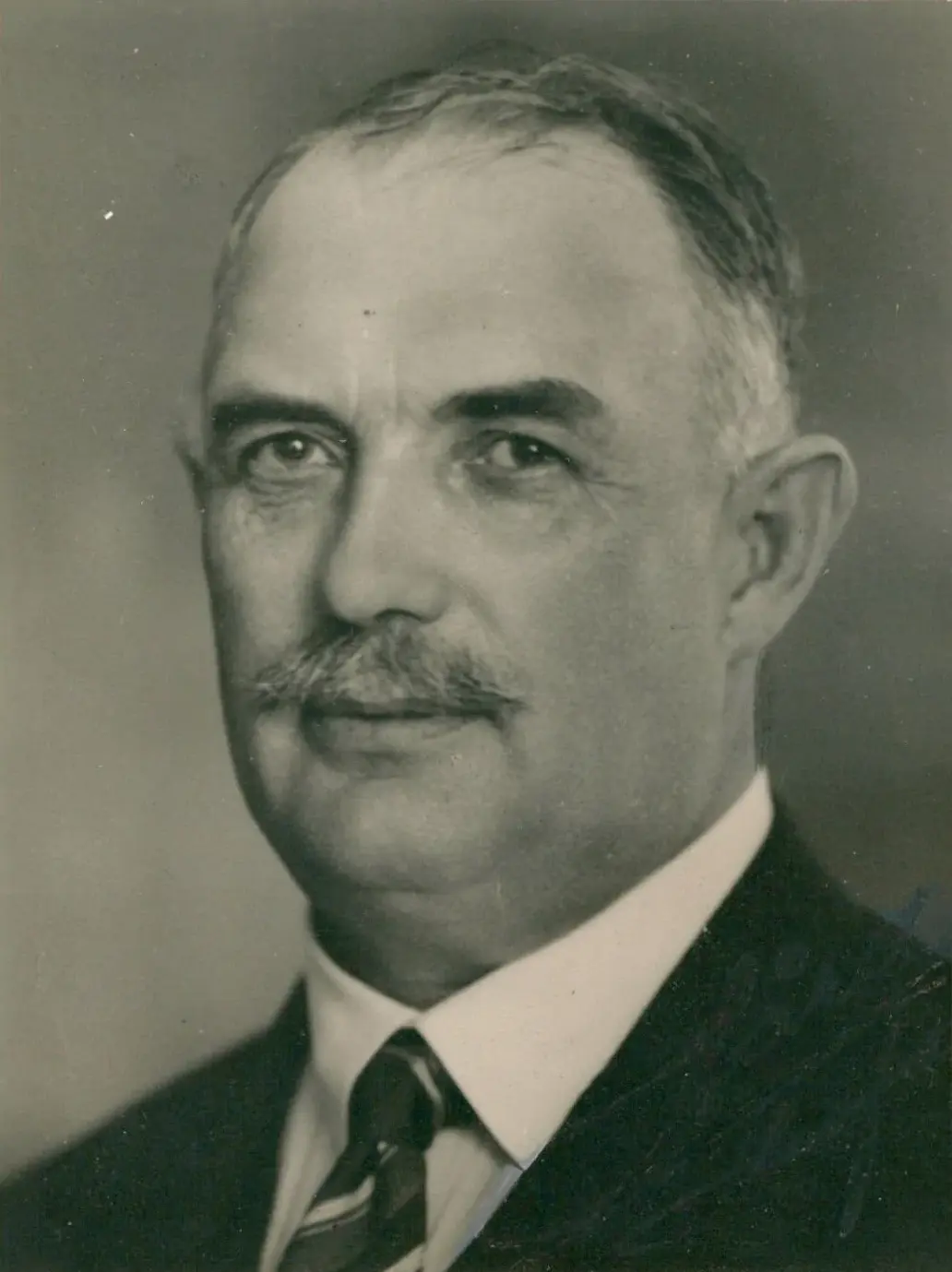
Axel Pehrsson-Bramstorp

- February 1 - Edwin Howard Armstrong, American electrical engineer (b. 1890)
- February 8 – Laurence Trimble, American actor (b. 1885)
- February 9 – Mabel Paige, American actress (b. 1880)
- February 12 – Dziga Vertov, Russian filmmaker (b. 1896)
- February 19 – Axel Pehrsson-Bramstorp, 24th Prime Minister of Sweden (b. 1883)
- February 21 – William K. Howard, American film director (b. 1899)

=== March ===
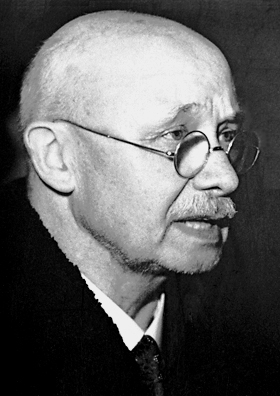
Otto Diels

- March 7
  - Otto Diels, German chemist, Nobel Prize laureate (b. 1876)
  - Will H. Hays, Namesake for the Hays Code (b. 1879)
- March 9 – Vagn Walfrid Ekman, Swedish oceanographer (b. 1874)
- March 12 – Marianne Weber, German sociologist and suffragist (b. 1870)
- March 13 – Cesar Klein, German painter (b. 1876)
- March 24 – Thành Thái, Emperor of Vietnam (b. 1879)
- March 26 – Louis Silvers, American film composer (b. 1889)
- March 30 – Fritz London, German physicist (b. 1900)

=== April ===
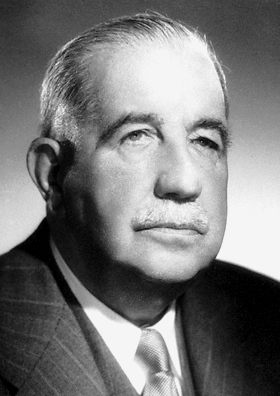
Léon Jouhaux

- April 2
  - Hoyt Vandenberg, U.S. Air Force general (b. 1899)
  - Maud Barger-Wallach, American tennis player (b. 1870)
- April 3 – Aristides de Sousa Mendes, Portuguese diplomat and humanitarian (b. 1885)
- April 7 – Saburō Kurusu, Japanese diplomat (b. 1886)
- April 10 – Auguste Lumière, French film pioneer (b. 1862)
- April 17 – Lucrețiu Pătrășcanu, Romanian communist activist and sociologist (b. 1900)
- April 27
  - Antoni Bolesław Dobrowolski, Polish scientist and explorer who participated in the Belgian Antarctic expedition (b. 1872)
  - Thorvald Ellegaard, Danish track cyclist (b. 1877)
- April 28 – Léon Jouhaux, French labor leader, recipient of the Nobel Peace Prize (b. 1879)
- April 29 – Joe May, Austrian-born film director (b. 1880)

=== May ===
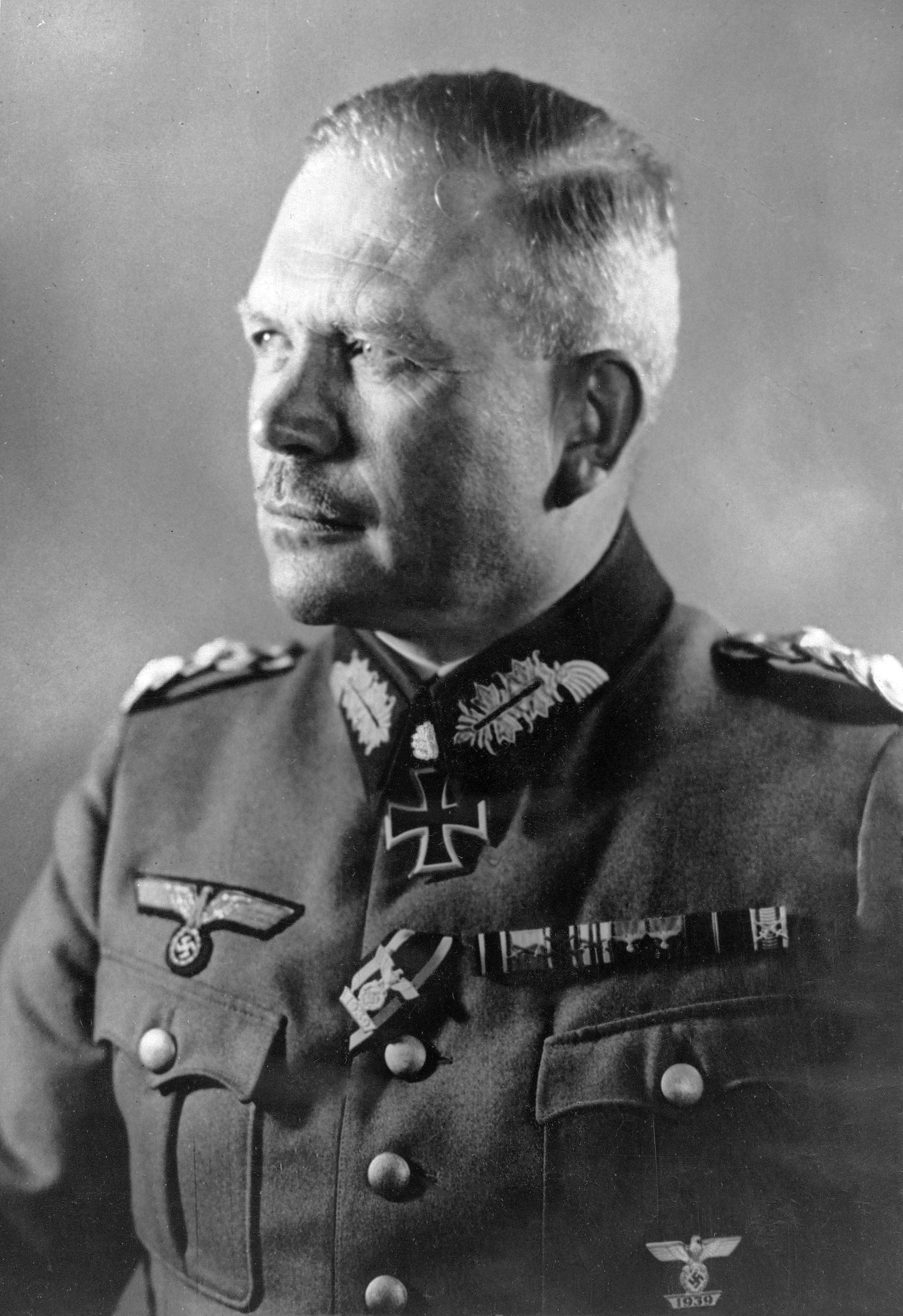
Heinz Guderian

- May 1 – Tom Tyler, American actor (b. 1903)
- May 5 – Henri Laurens, French sculptor and illustrator (b. 1885)
- May 6 – B. C. Forbes, Scottish-born publisher (b. 1880)
- May 14 – Heinz Guderian, German World War II general (b. 1888)
- May 15 – William March, American writer and soldier (b. 1893)
- May 19 – Charles Ives, American composer (b. 1874)
- May 22 – Chief Bender, Native-American baseball player (b. 1884)
- May 25 – Robert Capa, Hungarian-born photojournalist (b. 1913)
- May 26 – Omer Nishani, Albanian medical doctor and political figure (b. 1887)

=== June ===
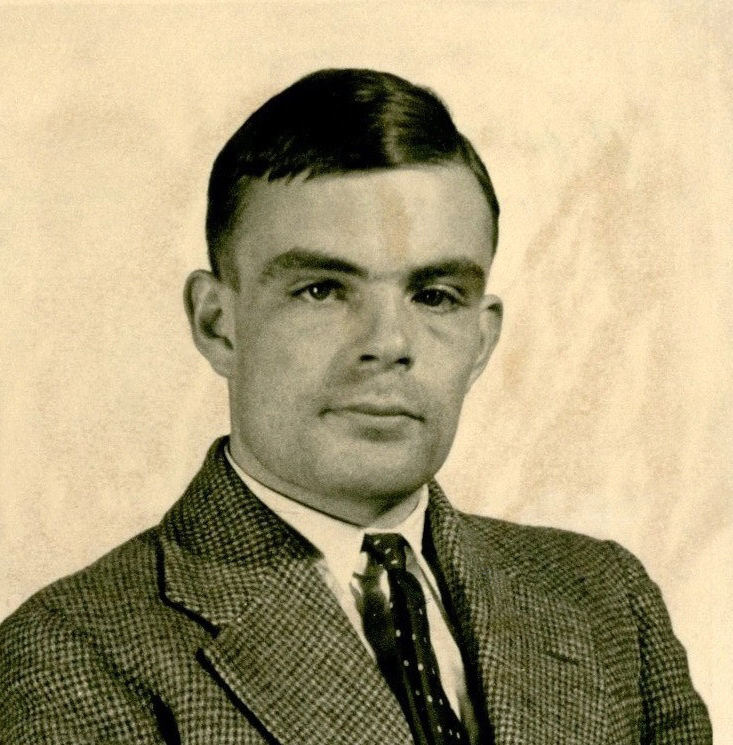
Alan Turing

- June 7 – Alan Turing, British mathematician, cryptanalyst, and pioneer computer scientist (b. 1912)
- June 9 – Alain LeRoy Locke, American writer, philosopher and educator (b. 1885)
- June 24 – Thomas Denman, 3rd Baron Denman, 5th Governor-General of Australia (b. 1874)
- June 30 – Andrass Samuelsen, 1st prime minister of Faroe Islands (b. 1873)

=== July ===
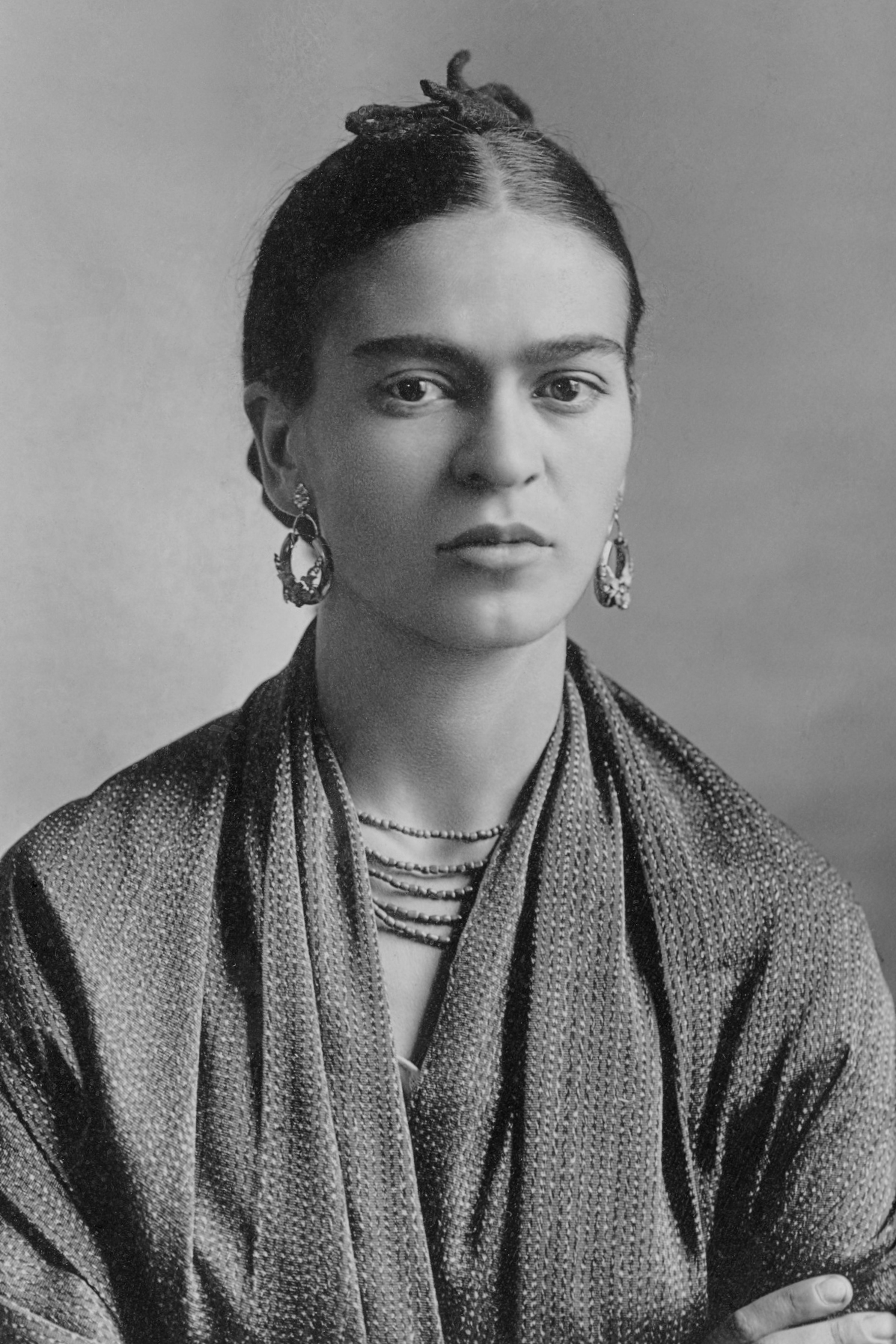
Frida Kahlo

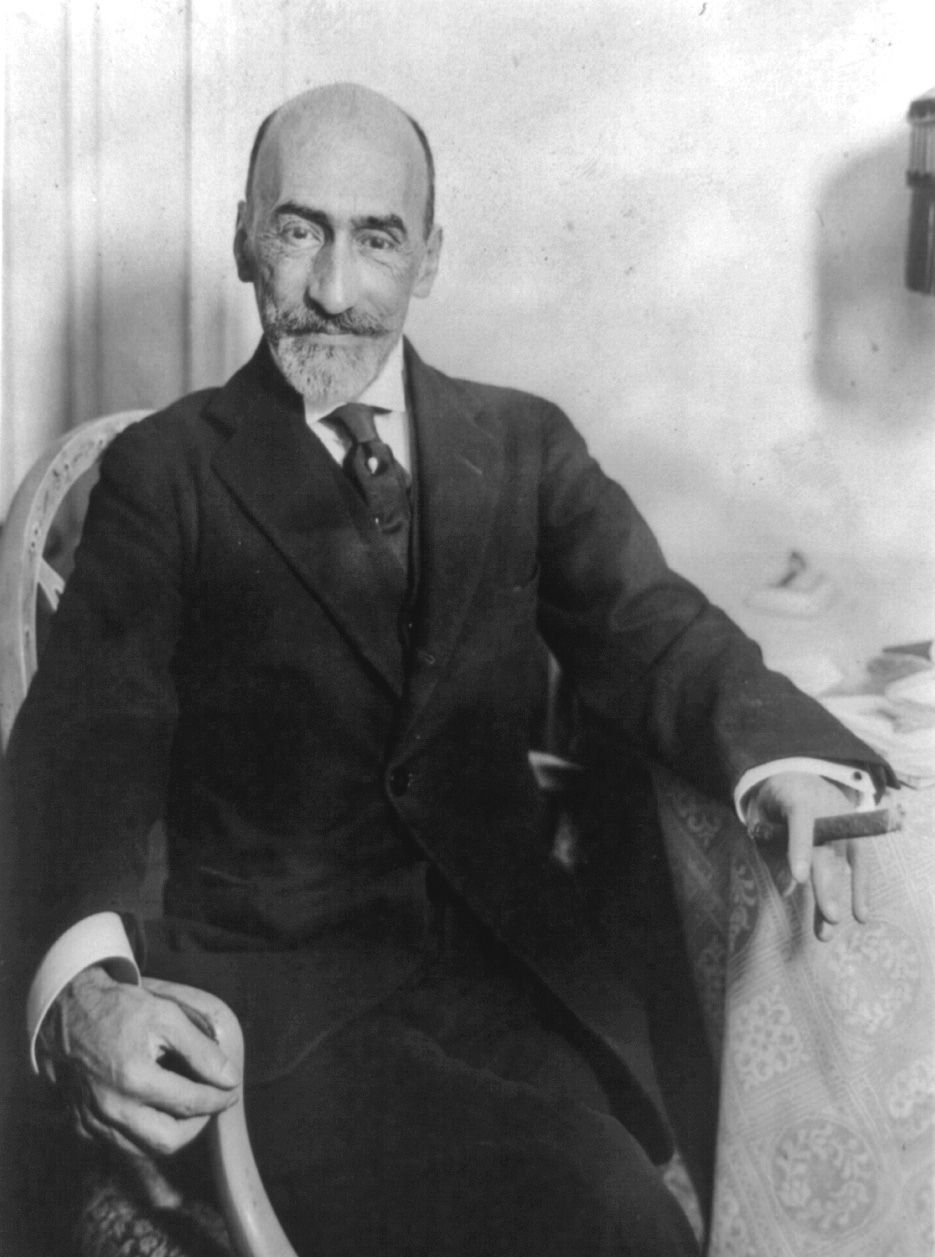
Jacinto Benavente

- July 1
  - Thea von Harbou, German actress (b. 1888)
  - Tomás Monje, 41st President of Bolivia (b. 1884)
- July 6
  - Gabriel Pascal, Hungarian-born film producer and director (b. 1894)
  - Cornelia Sorabji, Indian-born lawyer (b. 1866)
- July 13
  - Frida Kahlo, Mexican painter (b. 1907)
  - Irving Pichel, American actor and director (b. 1891)
- July 14 – Jacinto Benavente, Spanish dramatist, Nobel Prize laureate (b. 1866)
- July 16 – Herms Niel, German composer (b. 1888)
- July 17 – Machine Gun Kelly, American gangster (b. 1895)
- July 19 – Hannes Meyer, Swiss architect (b. 1889)
- July 28 – Sōjin Kamiyama or "Sojin", Japanese film star during the silent film era (b. 1884)

=== August ===
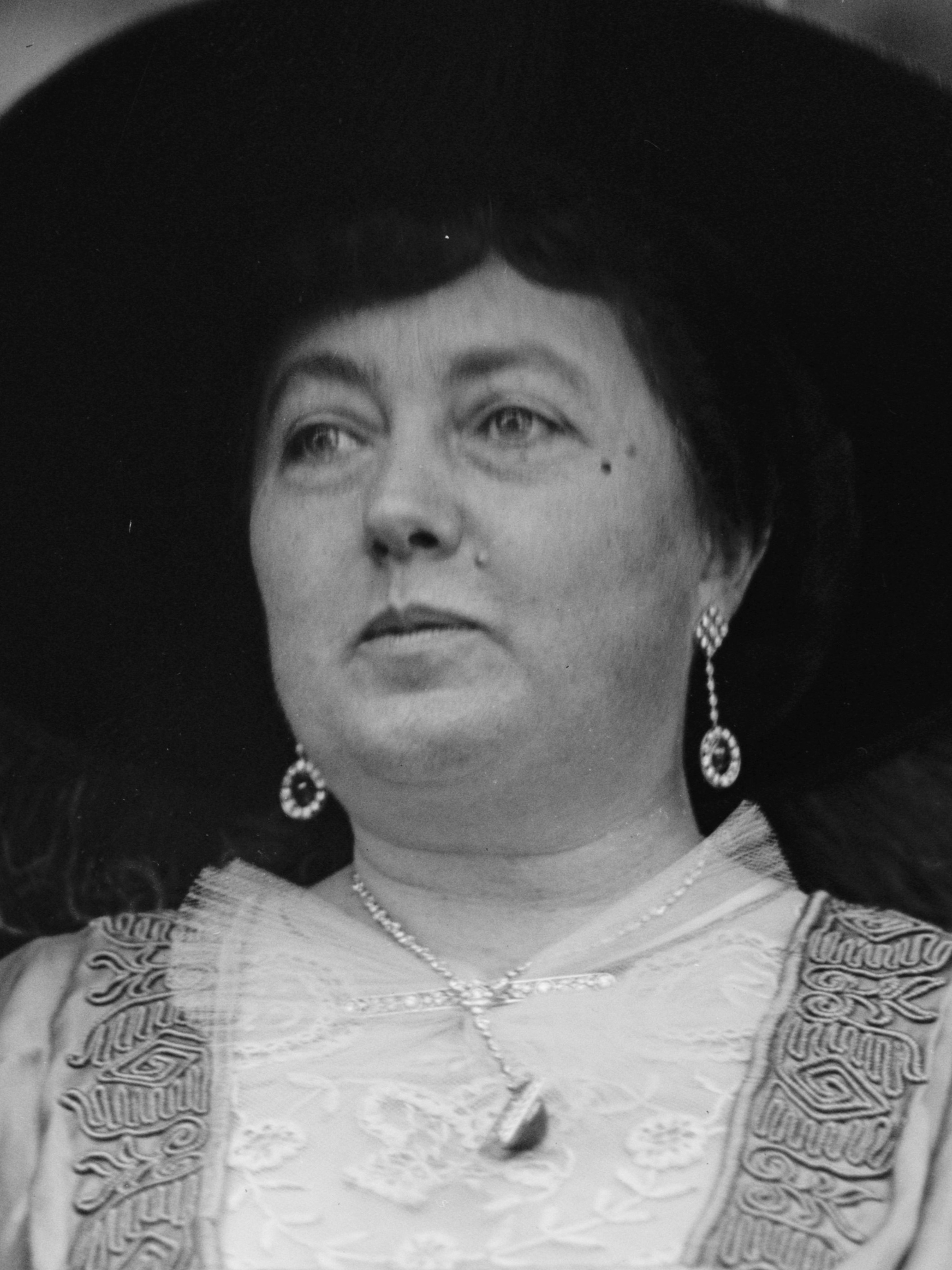
Harriet Mack

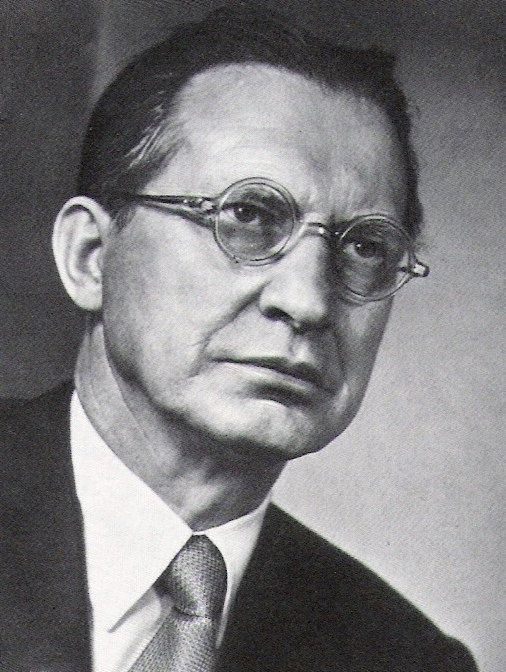
Alcide de Gasperi

- August 2 – Harriet Mack, American politician (b. 1866)
- August 3 – Colette, French novelist (b. 1873)
- August 11 – Murray Kinnell, English actor (b. 1889)
- August 14 – Hugo Eckener, German president of the Zeppelin Dirigible Company (b. 1868)
- August 19 – Alcide De Gasperi, Italian statesman and Christian Democracy politician, 30th Prime Minister of Italy (b. 1881)
- August 24 – Getúlio Vargas, 14th and 17th President of Brazil (b. 1882)

=== September ===
- September 2 – Franz Leopold Neumann, German political activist and Marxist theorist (b. 1900)
- September 3 – Eugene Pallette, American actor (b. 1889)
- September 5 – Eugen Schiffer, German politician (b. 1860)
- September 7 – Bud Fisher, American cartoonist (b. 1885)
- September 8 – André Derain, French artist, painter and sculptor (b. 1880)
- September 21 – Kokichi Mikimoto, Japanese pearl farm pioneer (b. 1858)
- September 25 – Eugenio d'Ors, Spanish writer (b. 1881)
- September 26 – Ellen Roosevelt, American tennis player (b. 1868)
- September 27 – Maximilian von Weichs, German field marshal (b. 1881)
- September 28 – Bert Lytell, American actor (b. 1885)
- September 29 – Martin Wetzer, Finnish general (b. 1868)

=== October ===
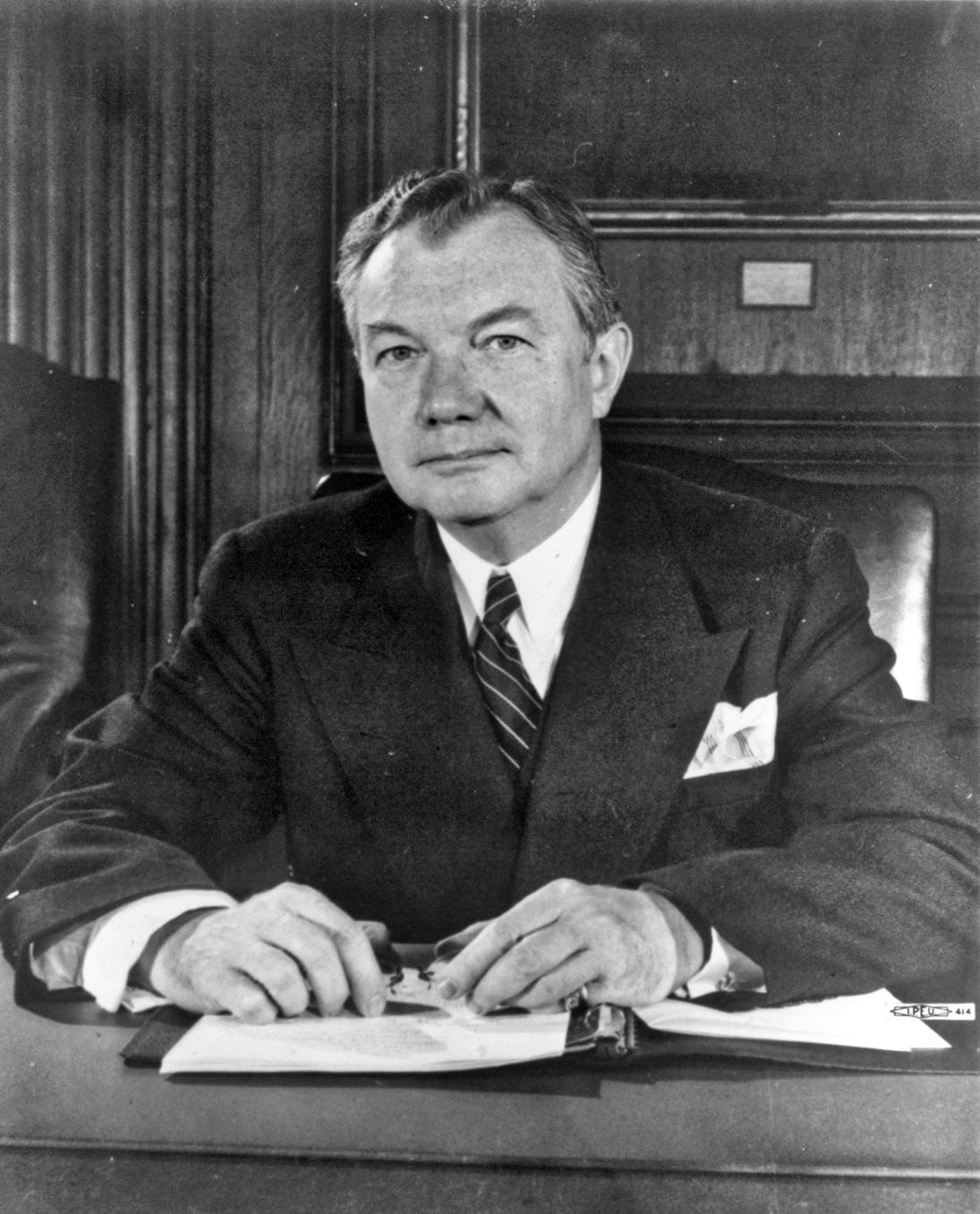
Robert H. Jackson

- October 9 – Robert H. Jackson, United States Supreme Court associate justice and chief prosecutor at the Nuremberg Trials (b. 1892)
- October 12 – George Welch, American aviator (b. 1918)
- October 19 – Hugh Duffy, American baseball player (Boston Braves) and a member of the MLB Hall of Fame (b. 1866)
- October 22 – Jibanananda Das, Indian poet, writer, novelist and essayist in Bengali (b. 1899)
- October 28 – Austin Hobart Clark, American zoologist (b. 1880)
- October 30 – Wilbur Shaw, American racing driver (b. 1902)

=== November ===
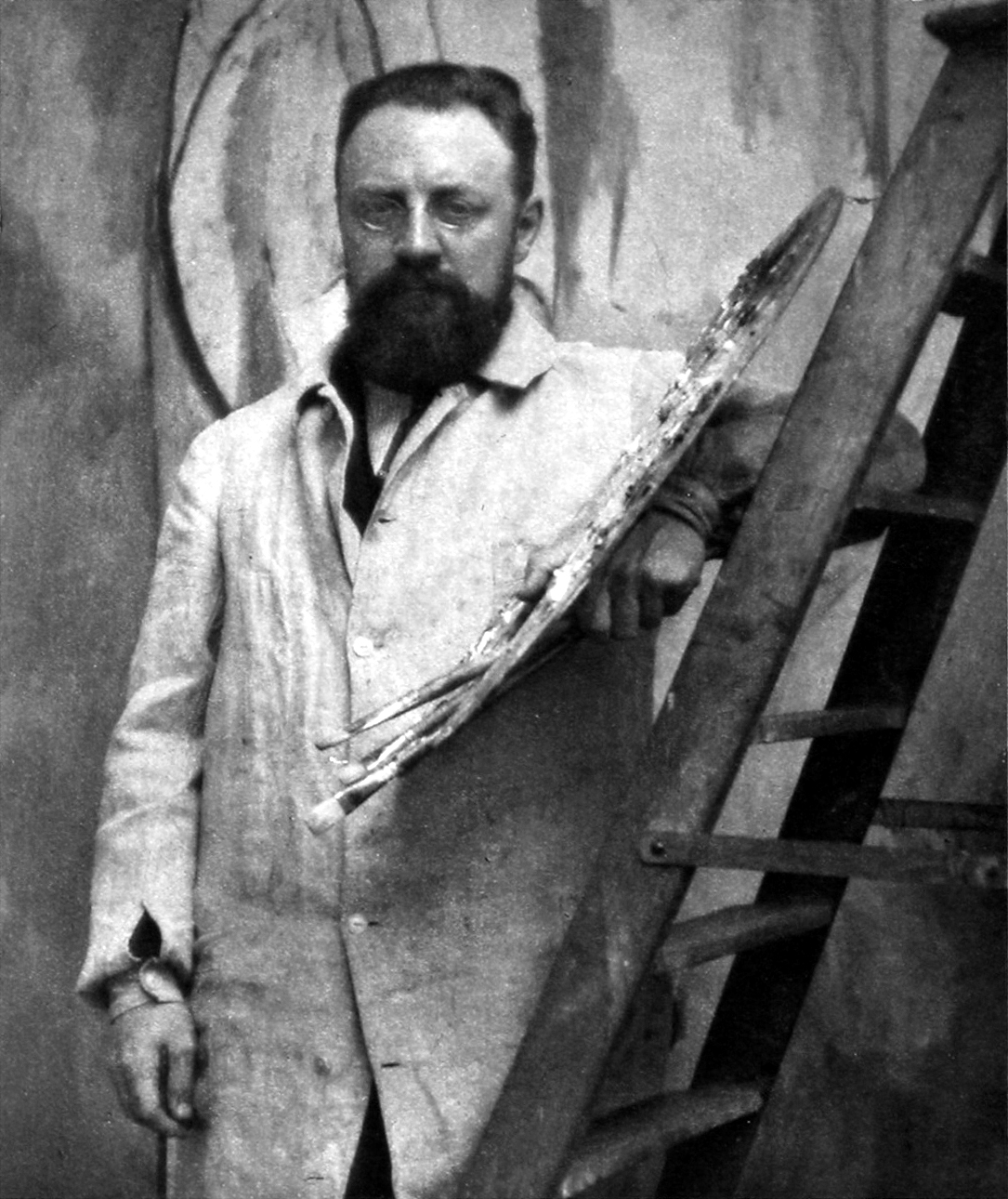
Henri Matisse

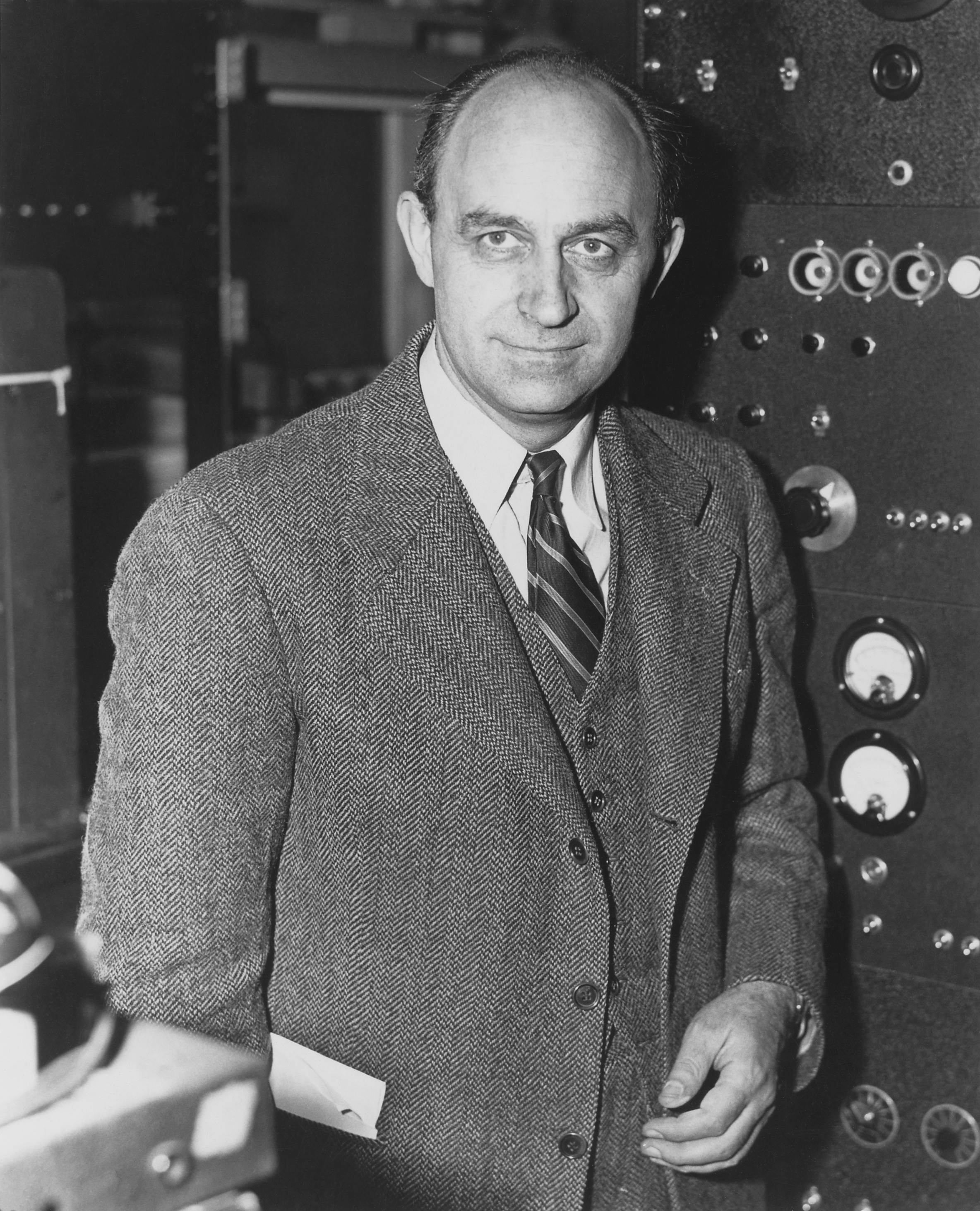
Enrico Fermi

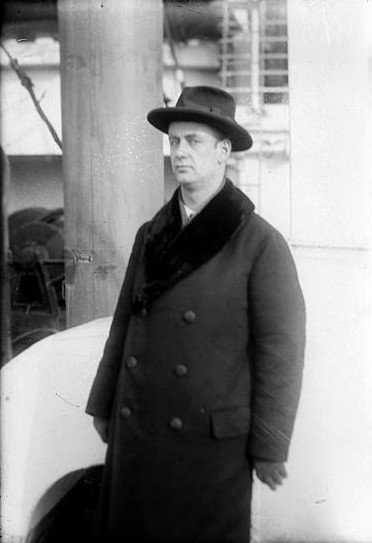
Wilhelm Furtwängler

- November 3 – Henri Matisse, French painter (b. 1869)
- November 10 – Édouard Le Roy, French philosopher and mathematician (b. 1870)
- November 11 – Suzanne Noël, French plastic surgeon, the first female plastic surgeon in the world (b. 1878)
- November 13 – Paul Ludwig Ewald von Kleist, German field marshal (b. 1881)
- November 15 – Lionel Barrymore, American actor (b. 1878)
- November 16 – Albert Francis Blakeslee, American botanist (b. 1874)
- November 20 – Clyde Cessna, American aviator and aircraft designer and manufacturer, founder of the Cessna Aircraft Corporation (b. 1879)
- November 22
  - Moroni Olsen, American actor (b. 1889)
  - Andrey Vyshinsky, Russian jurist and diplomat, former Soviet Foreign Minister (b. 1883)
- November 28 – Enrico Fermi, Italian physicist, Nobel Prize laureate (b. 1901)
- November 30 – Wilhelm Furtwängler, German conductor (b. 1886)

=== December ===
- December 1 – Fred Rose, American songwriter (b. 1898)
- December 8
  - Claude Cahun, French photographer and writer (b. 1894)
  - Gladys George, American actress (b. 1904)
- December 17 – Marie Celeste, American soprano and actress (b. 1875)
- December 20 – James Hilton, English novelist (b. 1900)
- December 30
  - Archduke Eugen of Austria, Austrian field marshal (b. 1863)
  - Günther Quandt, German industrialist who founded an industrial empire that today includes BMW and Altana (b. 1881)

== Nobel Prizes ==

- Physics – Max Born, Walther Bothe
- Chemistry – Linus Pauling
- Medicine – John Franklin Enders, Thomas Huckle Weller, Frederick Chapman Robbins
- Literature – Ernest Hemingway
- Peace – The Office of the United Nations High Commissioner for Refugees.
