= Asiatic =

Asiatic may refer to

- Related to Asia
- Asiatic (journal)
- SS Asiatic, a ship
- Asiatic style, a term associated with Greek writers of Asia Minor

== See also ==
- Asian (disambiguation)
