= Tiffanie =

Breed of domestic cat

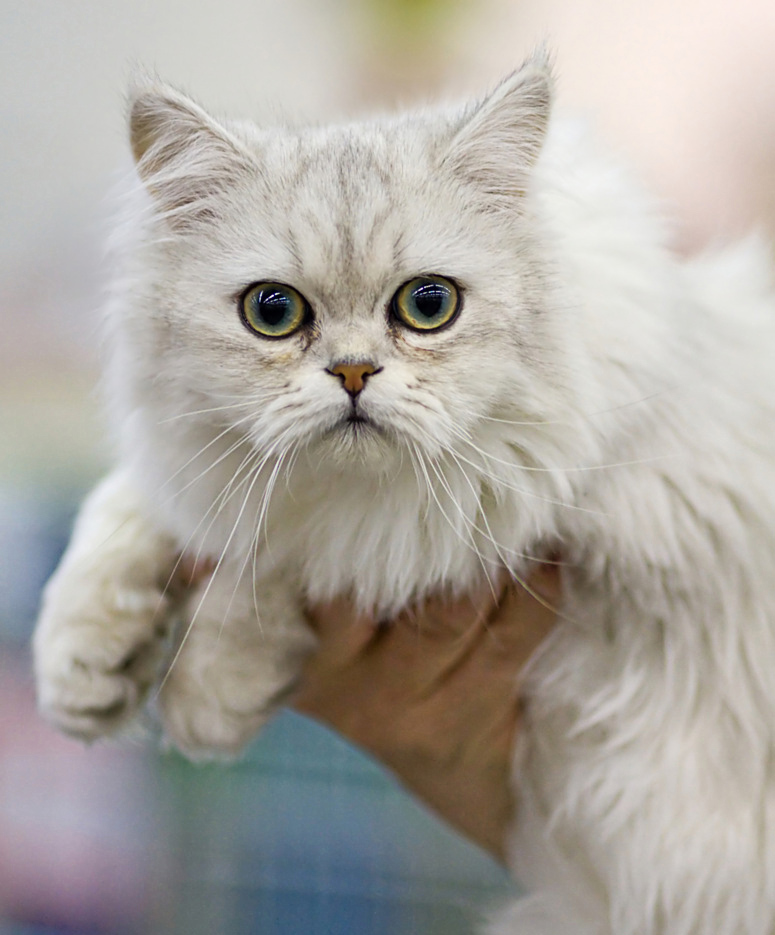
- A black silver male Tiffanie
- Other names: Asian Semi-longhair, Asian Longhair, Burmilla Longhair
- Origin: United Kingdom

Breed standards
- WCF: standard
- ACF: standard
- GCCF: standard
- LOOF: standard
- SACC: standard

Notes
- In ACF and ANCATS only in silver or golden tipped and shaded.

The Tiffanie is a cat breed similar to the Asian Shorthair except it has semi-long fur length. The breed belongs to the Asian Group and is generally recognised in any of the Asian Shorthair or Burmese colours and patterns. Like the other cats in the Asian Group, the breed was developed during the 1980s in the United Kingdom by crossbreeding a Persian Chinchilla and a Burmese.

In cat registries that recognise the breed, it is officially registered under the name Tiffanie or within the Asian Group as Tiffanie or Asian Longhair. In some registries the colouration is restricted to silver or golden tipped or shaded, and the breed is registered as Burmilla Longhair or Australian Tiffanie. Among the cat fancy the breed is also known as the Asian Semi-longhair.

The Tiffanie is often confused with the now extinct and unrelated Chantilly-Tiffany, or Foreign Longhair, a longhaired North American breed originating from chocolate-brown cats of unknown origin. Similarly, the Tiffany in the NZCF (New Zealand) refers to a Burmese longhair.

== History ==
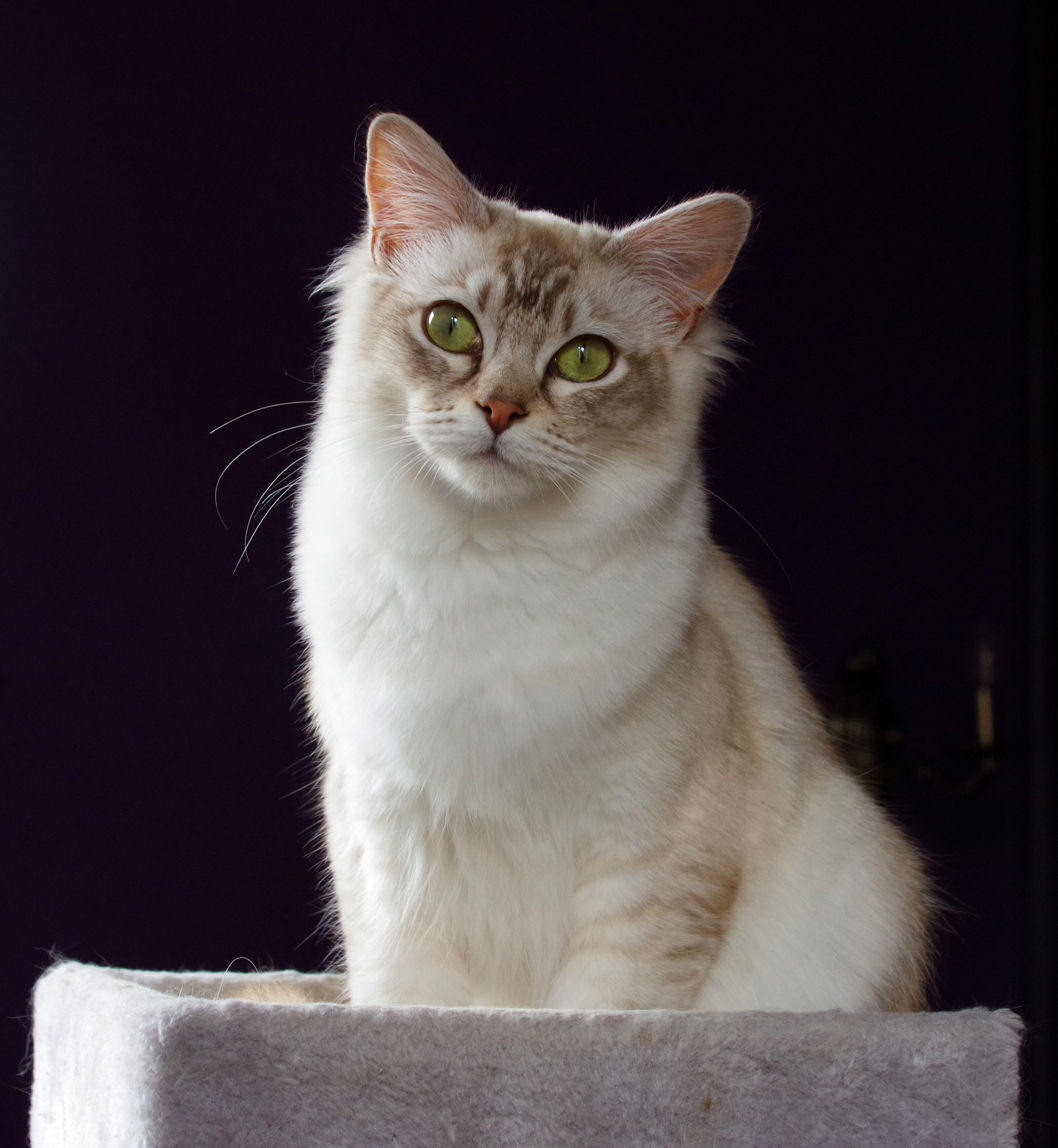
Chocolate silver shaded sepia female cat

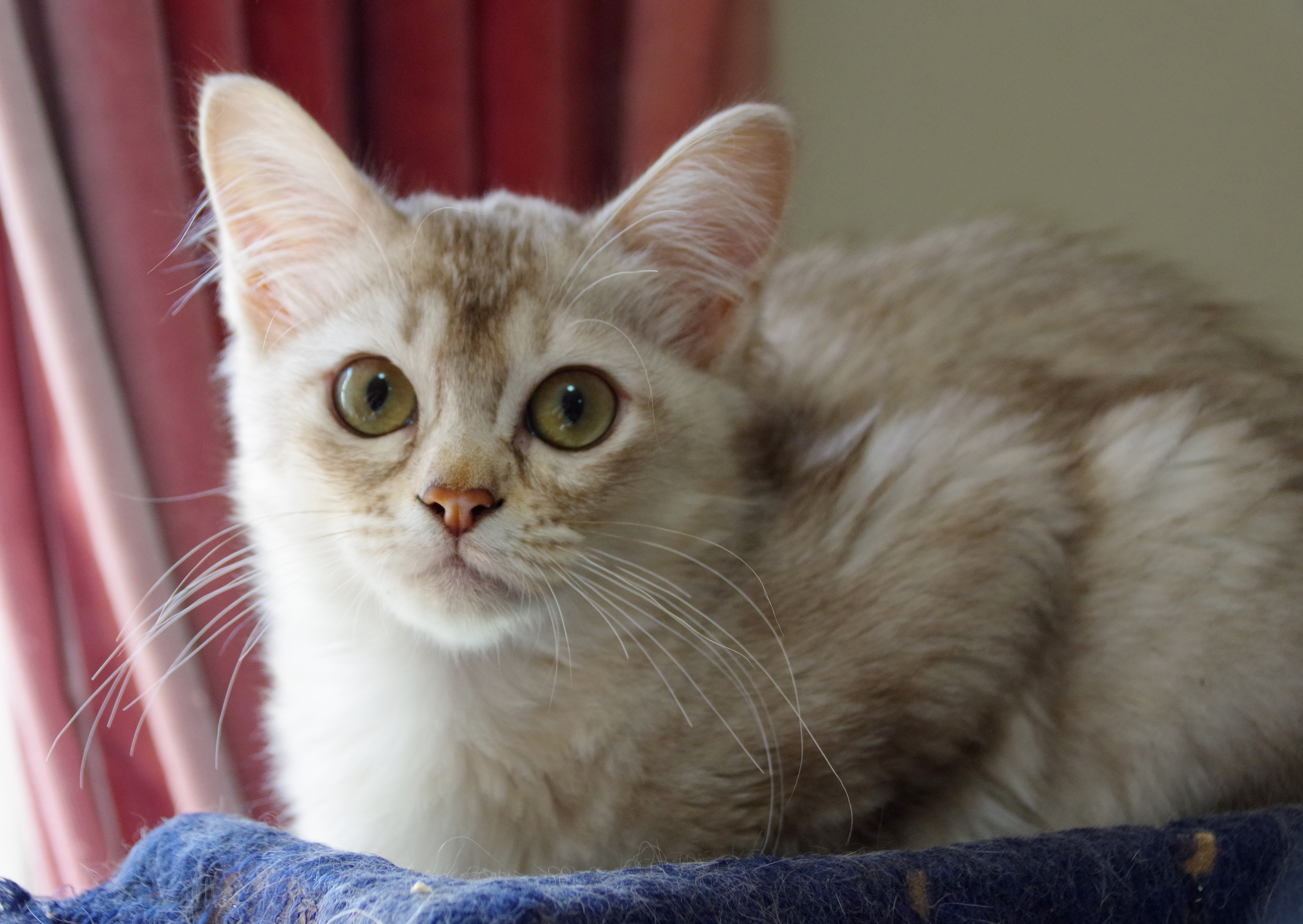
Chocolate silver shaded female kitten

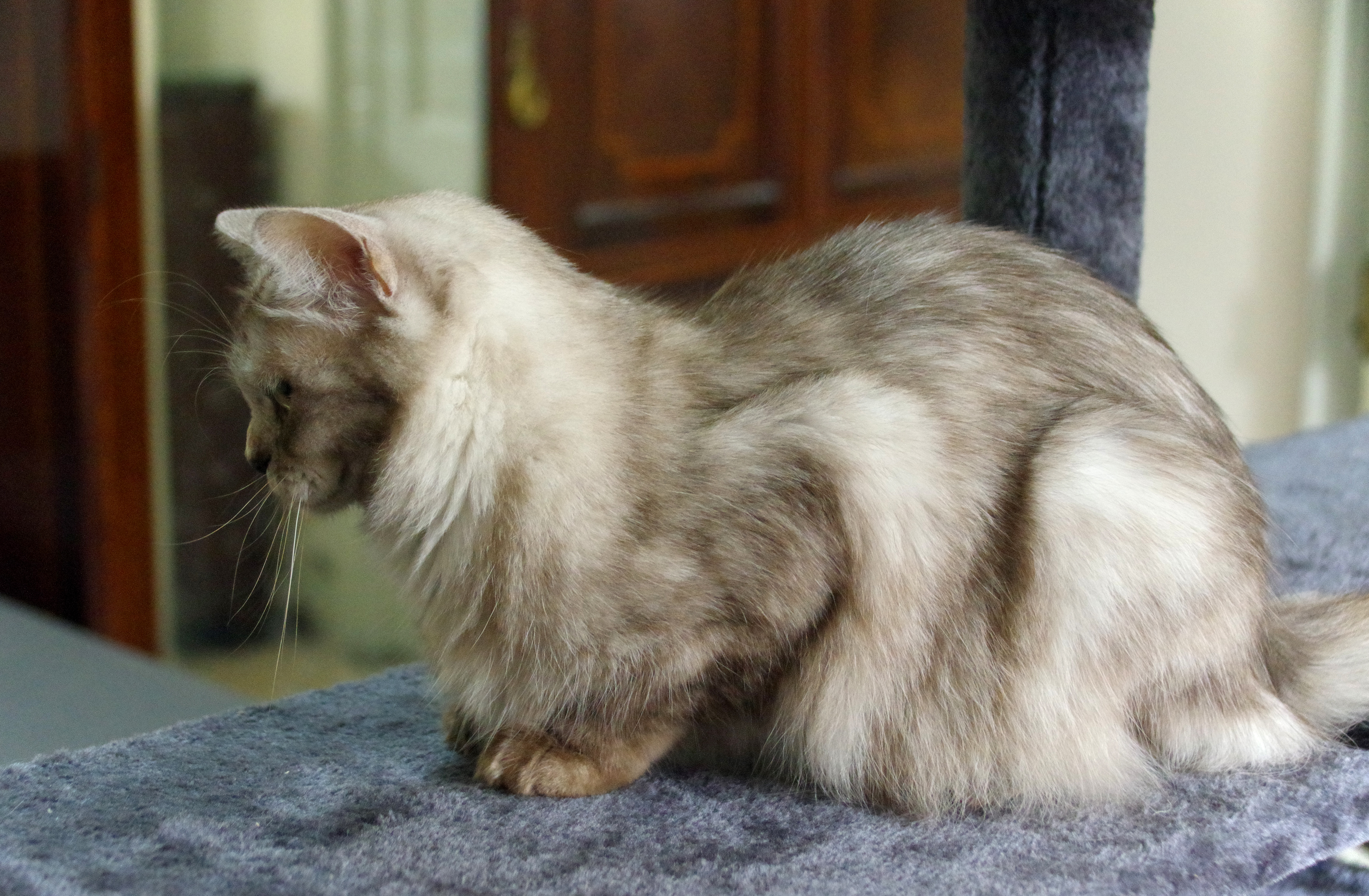
Side view of a chocolate tortoiseshell silver shaded female cat

=== Origin ===
The Tiffanie was developed in the 1980s in the United Kingdom as a longhaired version of the Asian Shorthair. The breed origins can be traced back to matings between a Persian Chinchilla and a Burmese.

=== Recognition ===
It has full recognition in the GCCF, LOOF, SACC, preliminary status with the WCF, and has registration only status with The International Cat Association. The Australian Tiffanie is recognised by ANCATS and the Burmilla longhair by ACF, which are distinctly different in colour to the Asian Semi-longhair Tiffanie as these only come in silver or golden tipped or shaded.

=== Australian Tiffanie ===
One governing body in Australia (Waratah National Cat Alliance, WNCA, now the Australian National Cats Inc., ANCATS) uses the name Australian Tiffanie; however, international acceptance and standardisation did not follow. It is different from the European Tiffanie and the North-American Chantilly-Tiffany. The Tiffanie from the UK is also originating from crossbreeding chinchilla Persian and Burmese cats. However, Australian Tiffanies are essentially longhair Burmillas, as they only come in silver or golden tipped or shaded. The breed is separately developed in the late-1990s in Australia from European Tiffanie cats by breeding them back to the chinchilla Persian. Therefore, many Australian Tiffanies contain more than three-quarters chinchilla Persian and retain the appearance and temperament of the Old-Fashioned chinchilla Persian. To summarise, the Australian Tiffanie and Tiffanie from the UK are both developed from crossbreeding chinchilla Persians and Burmeses, but the Australian version contains more chinchilla Persian. Consequently, only silver and golden tipped and shaded is allowed in the Australian Tiffanie. The name's use is declining in favour, due to the lax standards for the breed name, the lack of unique identity and the varied genetic makeup.
