= Asian =

Asian may refer to:

- Items from or related to the continent of Asia:
  - Asian people, people in or descending from Asia
  - Asian culture, the culture of the people from Asia
  - Asian cuisine, food based on the style of food of the people from Asia
  - Asian (cat), a cat breed similar to the Burmese but in a range of different coat colors and patterns
- Asii (also Asiani), a historic Central Asian ethnic group mentioned in Roman-era writings
- Asian option, a type of option contract in finance
- Asyan, a village in Iran

== See also ==
- East Asia
- South Asia
- Southeast Asia
- Asiatic (disambiguation)
