= Chantilly-Tiffany =

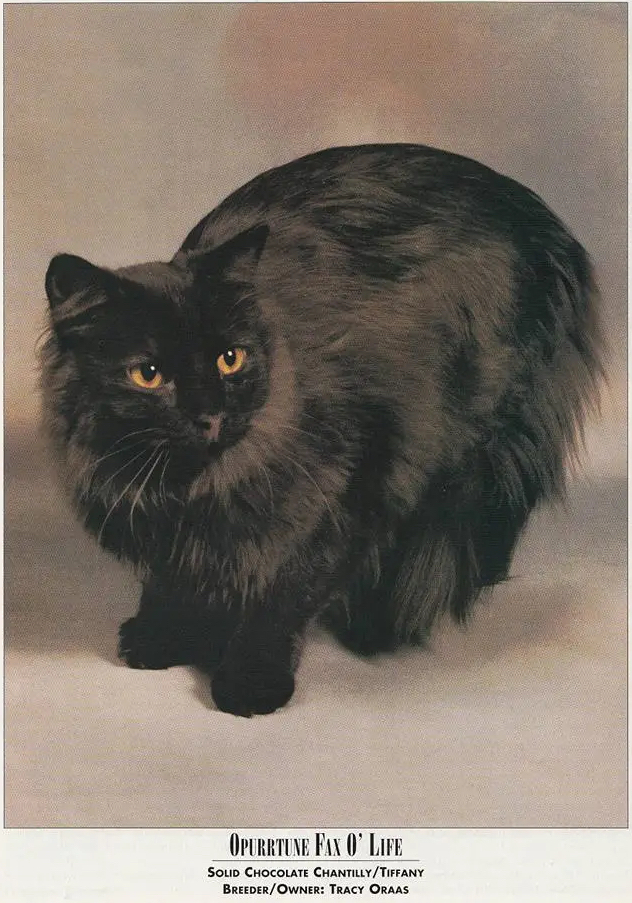
- Oppurtune Fax O’ Life, a solid chocolate Chantilly of breeder Tracy Oraas (1995)
- Other names: Chantilly, Tiffany, Foreign Longhair
- Origin: North America
- Foundation bloodstock: Long-haired chocolate cats of unknown ancestry
- Breed status: Extinct

Breed standards
- ACFA/CAA: historical standard
- CCA-AFC: standard

The Chantilly-Tiffany or Chantilly/Tiffany, also known as the Chantilly or the Foreign Longhair, was a breed of domestic cat which originated in the late 1960s in North America. The Chantilly breed never got off the ground and has always been rare. It was near extinction in the late 1980s and again in the late 2000s. Since 2015 the breed has been considered extinct with the passing and neutering of the last two cats of the Chantilly lineage, and with no intact Chantilly cats the inevitable resulting discontinuation of the breeding programme.

The Chantilly-Tiffany is often confused with the unrelated Tiffanie, or Asian/Burmilla longhair, a semi-longhaired breed originating in the UK. Similarly, a variety of that breed, the Australian Tiffanie, can cause confusion. Furthermore, the Tiffany in the NZCF (New Zealand) is sometimes confused with the Chantilly-Tiffany, but refers to a Burmese longhair.

== History ==
=== New York, US (1960s–1970s) ===
The Chantilly-Tiffany breed had its official beginning as a "Foreign Longhair"; in 1967, Jennie Robinson (Neotype Cattery) of New York, US, purchased a pair of semi-foreign longhaired chocolate cats with golden eyes of unknown background as part of an estate sale in White Plains, New York. They may have had the same parents but were not litter-mates. "Thomas" was about a year of age upon purchase, and "Shirley" was around six months.

Shirley's first litter of six kittens was born in May 1969. All kittens had a chocolate coat colour and shared a similar appearance. Robinson initiated a breeding programme to emphasise these traits. In the early 1970s, the ACA registered Thomas and Shirley, along with many of their descendants as "Foreign-Longhairs".

=== United States (1970s–1980s) ===
Robinson ended her breeding program in the 1970s. Sigyn Lund (Sig Tim Hil Cattery) a Florida Burmese breeder, purchased some of Robinson's kittens and took on the "Foreign Longhair" breeding program. The New York origin was not well known to the public at the time. Because of Lund's reputation as a Burmese breeder, it has been speculated that the Chantilly was a long-haired Burmese or related to the breed.

However, Robinson herself confirmed that the kittens born in May 1969 “were dark self-colours with no points and pinkish paw pads, the opposite of traits that identify Burmese.” She also confirmed that all the Chantillys in the US descended from Thomas and Shirley, and none were bred to Burmese cats. Similarly, Tracy Oraas, a major advocate of the Chantilly breed in the 1980–1990s, confirmed that the Burmese was never used in the breeding program. This hypothesis has now been discounted.

A change in the breed's name was requested by judges, because they felt the breed's current name "Foreign Longhair" was too general; the name "Mahogany" was suggested, but Lund changed the breed name from "Foreign-Longhair" to "Tiffany" for the latter's feeling of elegance and class. Lund promoted the breed under "Tiffany" after a theatre studio (precursor studio lots of both MGM and Columbia, respectively) in Los Angeles, US, during the 1920s, known for its elegance. The ACA dropped the "Tiffany" from recognition, their reason being its rarity. As a result, all breed representatives registered under the Lund (Sig Tim Hil Cattery) name became unregistered and lost their pedigree status.

After this event, the breed continued to be advertised as "Burmese". At one point, in an informal phone interview, Sig Tim Hil Cattery supplied information to researcher Joan Bernstein regarding these chocolate cats. This interview resulted in a publication of information, again suggesting the possibility they were the product of UK crosses between Burmese and Himalayans (a Persian/Siamese cross). This information was posted in Harper's Illustrated Handbook of Cats. In The Ultimate Cat Book by David Taylor in 1989, the Chantilly's history was also described as "produced from crossing Burmese cats with Longhairs". The false advertisement and the phone interview could explain the tie to the Burmese in these books. The confusion led the breed to near-extinction.

=== Canada (1970s–1980s) ===
Around the same time Robinson and Lund were developing the "Tiffany" in the United States, a Canadian acreage owner was surprised by a cat who appeared at his home in 1973. She was a long-haired, semi-foreign, chocolate, gold-eyed feline of unknown ancestry who gave birth to a litter of kittens. Once again these kittens were carbon copies of their mother, an experience shared by Robinson with the cats in her breeding program. Offspring of these were rescued by Canadian breeders to re-establish the "Tiffany" breed in North America with a cooperative effort with Robinson and Lund.

=== North America (1980s–1990s) ===
One major advocate of the Chantilly was Tracy Oraas (Opurrtune Cattery) from Canada, who began her involvement with the breed in 1988 when she responded to a classified ad advertising "chocolate kittens." Oraas got in touch with Siamese Oriental breeder Jan DeRegt (Jan's PrettyCats Cattery) also from Canada, and Oraas and DeRegt undertook efforts to reestablish the breed after consulting a TICA judge. This judge expressed that nothing on the show bench compared with them. It took some major detective work, including calls to every veterinarian in Florida, but they managed to contact the original Chantilly breeders, Robinson and Lund. Oraas and DeRegt also concluded that the Burmese breed was never used in any Chantilly breeding program. Their research did reveal that English breeders had crossed Foreign Longhair (Angora), Havana Brown and Abyssinian cats in an attempt to recreate an Angora-type cat. They suspect that the Chantilly may have been a product of these efforts. Since none of the original Chantillys could be found, they established the breed using registered European Angora, Havana Brown, Abyssinian/Somali and Nebelung cats.

In 1992, Oraas was asked to rename the breed because of possible confusion with the British Tiffanie created in 1981. Wishing to preserve the elegance the "Tiffany" name represented, they chose "Chantilly." In 2000, TICA's Legal Council stated that breeders were only allowed to use the name Chantilly and were not allowed to use TICA and Chantilly/Tiffany together.

=== Last Chantilly cattery (1990s–2000s) ===
Oraas bred "Chantilly/Tiffany" cats up to the early 2000s, then seems to have faded from the breeding scene. In 2001, a few catteries were working with the Chantilly: one in Canada (Le Pors), and two in the United States—West Virginia (Emberhearth Cattery) and southern Illinois (Amorino Cattery). (Note: Possibly there was another one, as the “Chantilly/Tiffany cat project” also mentions a breeder in Washington State in the United States, but this one is not mentioned on the breeder list of Cats United. A breeder in Germany is also mentioned in this list of the “Chantilly/Tiffany cat project”, as it is also part of the breeder list of Cats United. However, from the colours mentioned in the Cats United list (“shell, shaded, smoke and self, also in tortie cream and red”) and the pedigreed cats registered at Minberry’s, it becomes clear that Marion Minich is/was a Tiffanie (Asian/Burmilla longhair) breeder instead of a Chantilly-Tiffany breeder. In 1998 Tracy Oraas sent breeding stock to Mr. De Boer in the Netherlands. The results of this Dutch breeding program are unknown.)

By 2003, Amorino Cattery of breeder Davenport-Parini was the only operating Chantilly cattery left in the US. Anne Davenport-Parini started Amorino Cattery in 2001 when she brought chocolate tabby Hershey Nugget (also known as Little Tabby Dude, LTD) of Emberhearth Cattery home to Illinois. Nugget was the grandson of Mica, a solid chocolate female Chantilly from Opurrtune Cattery of Tracy Oraas. Amorino Cattery had also acquired two female Chantilly cats; solid blue Cadeautje (Dutch: Little Present, which was also known as Katie, from Emberhearth Cattery) and solid lilac Nuage (from Opurrtune Cattery). Nugget produced at least 10 kittens with the two females before his retirement and passing in 2013 due to fatal lung damage received during the 2012 fire.

=== Extinction (2010s) ===
In 2012, a fire destroyed Amorino Cattery and its archives. With the fall of Amorino Cattery, the breed was facing extinction. The last Chantilly known in the US was solid chocolate Frosty (grandson of Nugget and Nuage). Frosty and Nugget appear together in the "Chantilly" episode of Cats 101, which was filmed at Amorino Cattery in 2012. Later that year after the fire, Frosty was shipped to a Nebelung breeder in Norway (Cacao Criadero Cattery). There was a struggle to get Frosty to breed to the Nebelung female (Nebelungs were permitted cross-outs). One solid lilac kitten, Acey, was produced in the efforts in 2013. In 2015, the Norwegian breeder gave up on the Chantilly breeding program after the death of Frosty, and fixed her female, Acey. As a result of this event, the last known Chantilly lineage ended, and the breed is considered extinct. There are no intact Chantilly cats alive and there are no operating Chantilly breeding programmes as of 2024.

== Registration ==
=== Registry ===
The Chantilly was initially registered with ACA in the early 1970s as Foreign Longhair and later as Tiffany. However, with the lack of sufficient cats to form a breed, the recognition was reverted and the breed lost its pedigree status due to its rarity. When the breed was near extinction in the late 1980s, breeder Tracy Oraas and Jan DeRegt revived the breed and registered it under the name Chantilly. Eventually, the Chantilly had been recognised and was eligible for championship or registration as Experimental or New Breed and colour (NBC) status with AACE, ACFA, CCA-AFC, CFF, TCA, TICA, and UFO.

In 2009, only a total of 15 Chantilly cats were ever registered in the Experimental Registry-category (VI) with TICA; 4 in 1992, 3 in 2000, 3 in 2002, and 5 in 2003.

=== Out-crossing ===
The ACFA only accepted out-crossings with the Havana Brown, Somali, and Nebelung in this experimental breed. The CCA only allowed out-crossings with Angora, Oriental, Havana Brown, Somali, and Nebelung cats. Out-crossing with Burmese cats was never performed, and never permitted in registries.

== Appearance ==
=== Body ===
The Chantilly-Tiffany has a semi-foreign body style and a full semi-long coat. The coat is silky, soft and smooth; the lack of undercoat usually makes grooming simpler than that of cats with an undercoat. The Chantilly was slow to mature and developed its full coat and colour expression at about one to two years old. Adults have a weight range of 2.5–5 kg.

=== Head ===
The eye colour of the feline intensified with age. The only accepted eye colour was yellow to gold in any shade with or without a green “halo” around the pupil. Green eyes were not allowed. The eyes were almond to oval-shaped, wide-set, and slightly angled. The head had to be a broad, modified wedge with gentle curves and wide-set cheekbones. It should have a medium-length nose and a strong, broad, short, softly squared muzzle. The whisker pads are defined but not obvious.

=== Coat colour ===
The Chantilly-Tiffany originated in a chocolate colour, but later on was accepted in a range of colours including blue, chocolate, lilac, cinnamon, and fawn. In the CCA breed standard black was also included, however it was not with the ACFA. Accepted patterns were solid, mackerel, ticked, and spotted tabby; consequently classic/blotched tabby, colourpoint, and white spotting were not allowed. The colour was rich; shading in solids may occur toward the underside. The overall impression of an ideal Chantilly was a semi-foreign cat of striking appearance resulting from the combination of its rich colour and full, silky semi-longhair coat, plumed tail, contrasting neck ruff, and ear furnishings.

== Health ==
Some sources claim Chantilly-Tiffanys were over-groomed. They tended to pull their own hair, which could lead to patches of baldness and the formation of digestive tract hairballs. To help prevent this, the cat should be brushed at least every other day to help control loose and shedding hair.

On the contrary, according to the ACFA breed standard and Chantilly originator and breed advocate (J. Robinson and T. Oraas) the Chantilly was easily groomed due to its lack of undercoat and was little shedding.
