= Bombay cat =

Breed of cat

Bombay
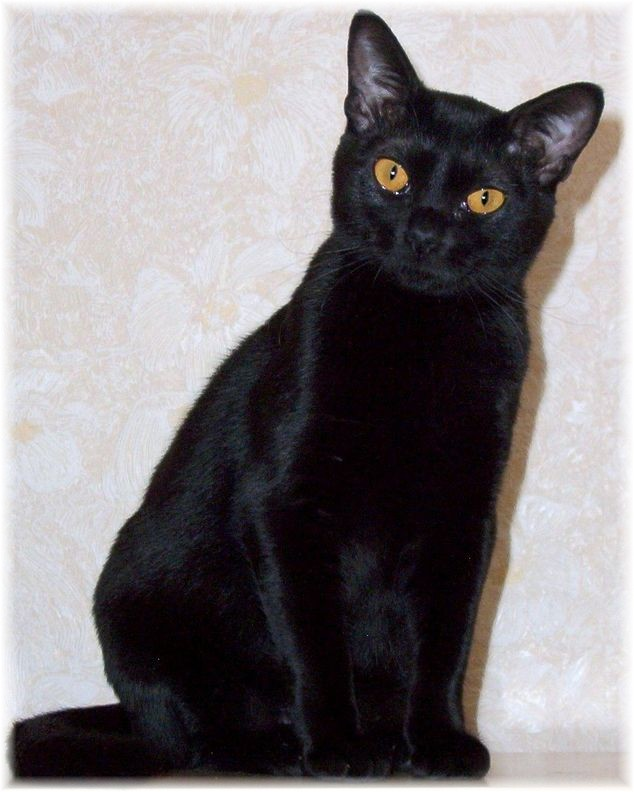
- A female Bombay cat
- Common nicknames: Parlor Panther
- Origin: United States (US-type)

Breed standards
- CFA: standard
- FIFe: standard
- TICA: standard
- ACF: standard
- ACFA/CAA: standard
- CCA-AFC: standard

The Bombay cat is a short-haired breed of domestic cat. Bombays are glossy solid black cats with a muscular build, and have characteristic large bright copper-golden eyes. The breed is named after the Indian city of Bombay (Mumbai), referring to the habitat of the Indian black leopard.

There exist two different variants of Bombay breed: the American Bombay and the British Bombay. US-type Bombays were developed by crossbreeding sable American Burmese and black American Shorthair cats, to produce a cat of mostly Burmese type, but with a sleek, panther-like black coat with copper-golden eyes. UK-type Bombays are solid black-coloured Asian Self cats under the Asian group, a group of European Burmese and chinchilla Persian crosses. The UK-type Bombay originated from three mismatings of European Burmese with black domestic short-haired cats.

Both types of Bombay cats are selectively bred by breeders and pedigreed in multiple major cat fancier and breeder organisations. Similar to other officially recognised cat breeds, the term "Bombay" is only meant to be used for cats from this specific breed, which are by definition all purebred cats with a known and formally registered ancestry, also known as the cat's pedigree or "paperwork".

== History ==
Starting in 1958, the US-type Bombay breed was developed by Nikki Horner, a breeder from Louisville, Kentucky, USA, who attempted to create a breed of cat that resembled a miniature black panther. The first attempt was a failure, but the second, in 1965, was successful.

== Breed registration ==
The US-type breed was officially recognised and registered by the Cat Fanciers' Association (CFA) in 1970 and The International Cat Association (TICA) in 1979. Within the Fédération Internationale Féline (FIFe), the Bombay only holds preliminary recognition status.

The UK-type is registered as the Asian Self under the Asian group with the Governing Council of the Cat Fancy (GCCF), which is the sole registry that recognises the British Bombay and operates in the UK.

=== Popularity ===
The Bombay cat is a relatively rare breed among pedigree cats, both in the US and UK types. All the UK-type Bombays are pedigreed with the GCCF as the Asian Self under the Asian group. In 2023, only 160 kittens of the entire Asian group were pedigreed. There is no data available for the British Bombay specifically.

The US-type is notably more popular than the UK-type, although still rare. In France specifically, an average of 45 Bombay kittens were born annually between 2003 and 2022. In 2024, only 13 Bombay kittens were registered with the major global registry FIFe, representing less than 0,1% of their total registrations and ranking place 49th out of the 54 breeds in popularity. Data from TICA, one of the largest cat registries globally, indicates that between 1979 and 2013, a total of 1085 Bombay cats (32 on average annually) were registered with them. PawPeds is the largest cat pedigree database worldwide, which contains data on both living and deceased cats across all pedigree organisations. As of June 2024, PawPeds reported a total of 1717 registered Bombay cats, with 406 of those born after January 2000.

== Characteristics ==
=== Appearance ===
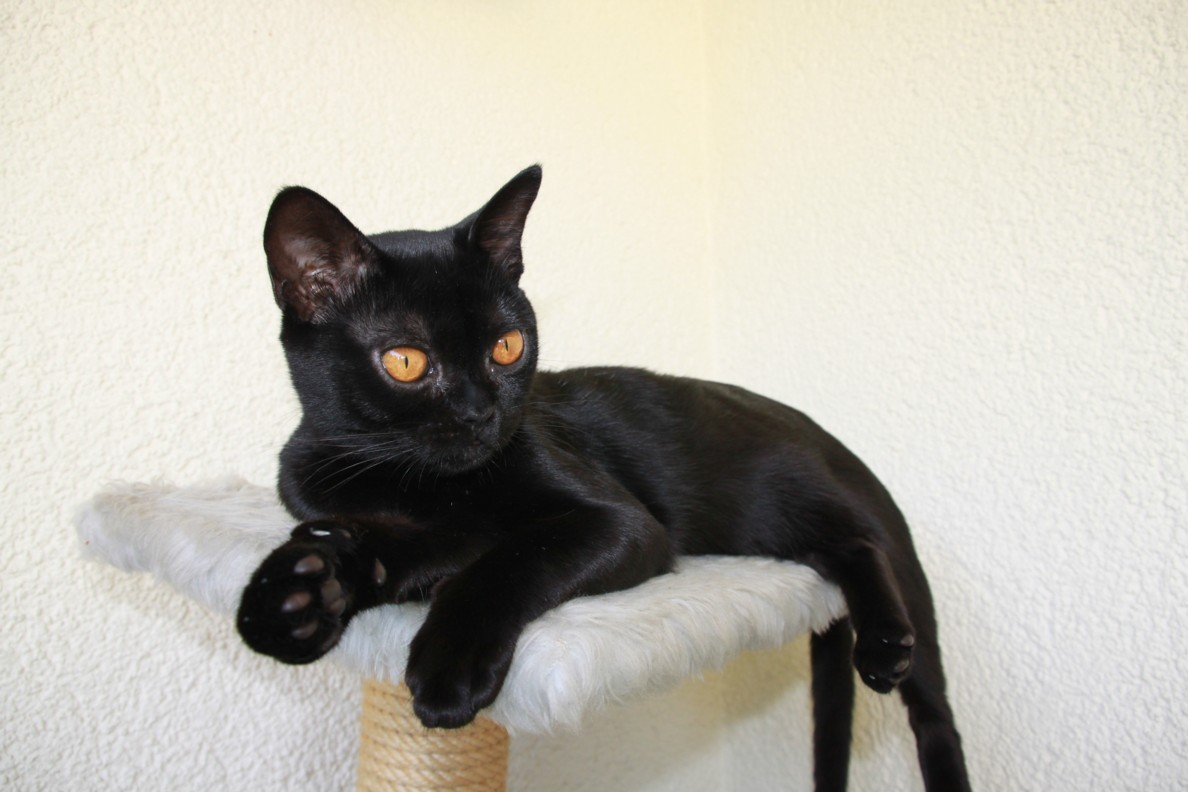
Lying adult.

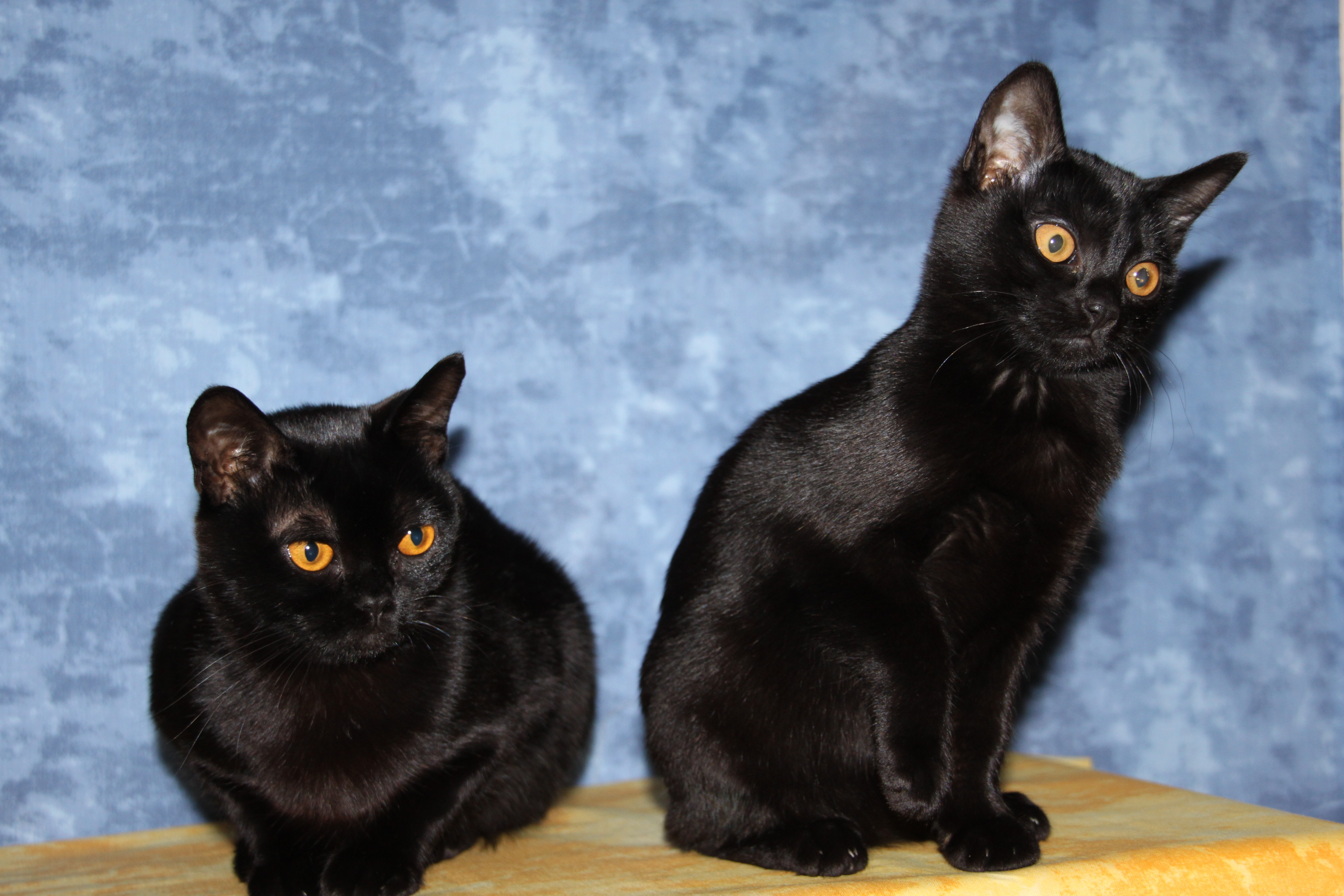
Two adults.

The Bombay is a short-haired pedigreed breed of domestic cat, closely related to the Burmese. The US-type Bombay is described as the "patent leather kid with the new penny eyes." The cats are characterised as having an all-black coat, including the whiskers, and black skin, including the soles and nose leather. The close-lying, sleek and glossy black coat of mature cats is coloured to the roots with no paling (exceptions are allowed in juvenile cats less than 2 years old). The eyes are always copper-golden coloured, and green (or any other colour) eyes are not allowed.

The Bombay has a medium-sized, Oriental-type body build that is muscular. Their weight ranges between 2.5–5 kg (5.5–11.0 lb), with males typically being heavier than females.

=== Breed standard ===
Body: Medium size, graceful and elongated Oriental-type body. Elegant tail of medium length.

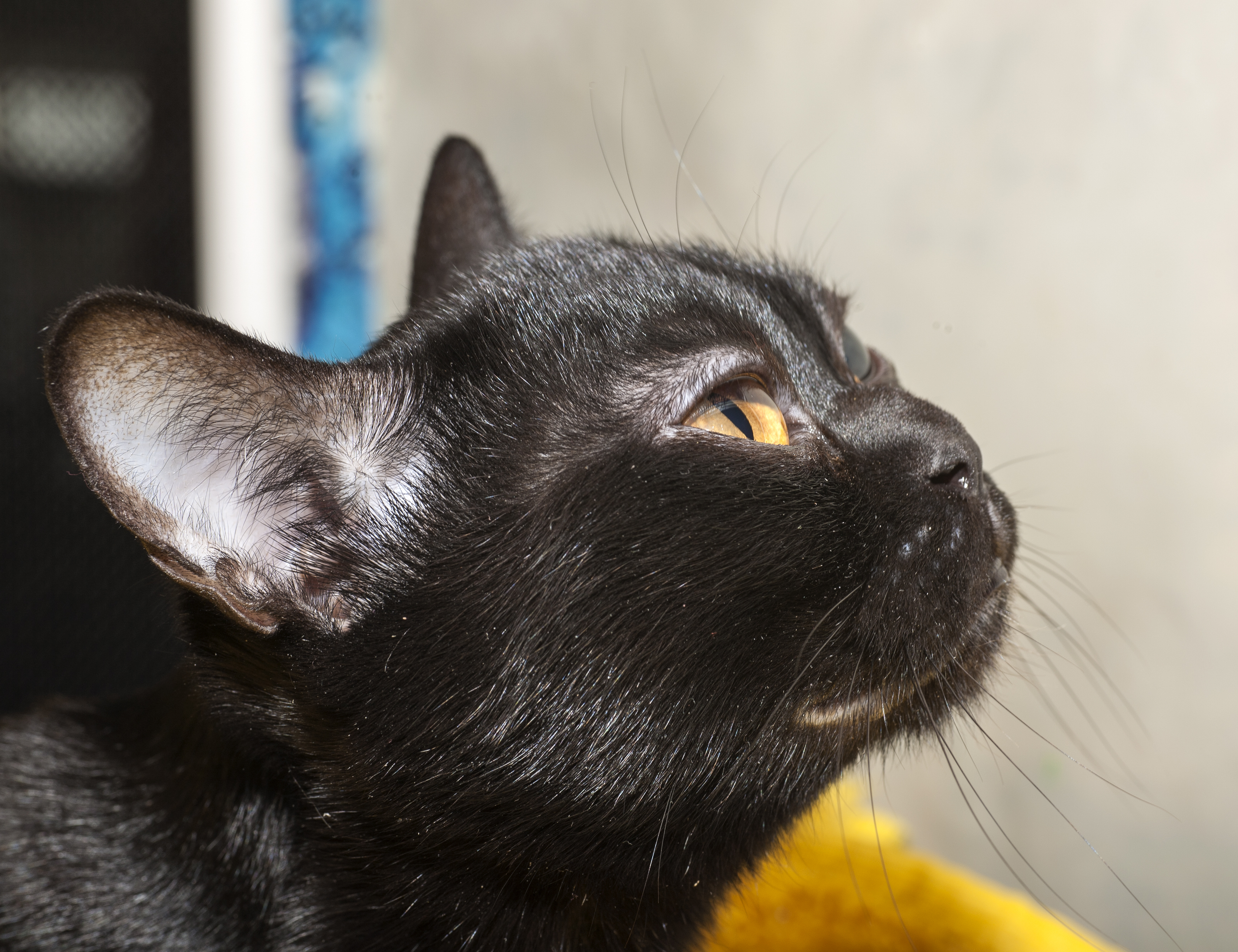
Typical side profile of the head.

Head: Rounded heads with no sharp angles, and short. The shape is smooth. The muzzle is short, with a moderate nose "stop" which is visible (not a break). The short-nosed head shape is similar to the American-type Burmese. The medium-sized ears are wide-set, straight, and rounded at the tips.

Eyes: The large, round eyes are set far apart and are always copper-coloured, but can range from bright orange to warm golden. Green eyes are not allowed.

Coat: Short, dense and shiny, tight to the body, with a lacquered sheen. Only completely solid black coloured coats are allowed.

Weight: For females, the average is 2.5–3.5 kg (6–8 lb). For males, the average is 3.5–5 kg (8–11 lb).

=== Behaviour ===
The personality of the Bombay tends to be highly social, is marked by strong attachment to families, and is typified by craving attention. As a breed, these characteristics make them highly suitable for children.

Domesticated Bombay cats have been noted to thrive as strictly indoor cats, and are able to survive in a single room apartment, so long as all of their needs are met. Anecdotally, many prefer quieter surroundings.

== Health ==
A healthy Bombay has an average lifespan of 15 years, and some have been known to live up to 20. They are prone to nasal and sinus problems, and gingivitis. Their food intake should be controlled to avoid overfeeding.
