= Mohammad A. Quayum =

- মোহাম্মদ এ কাইয়ুম
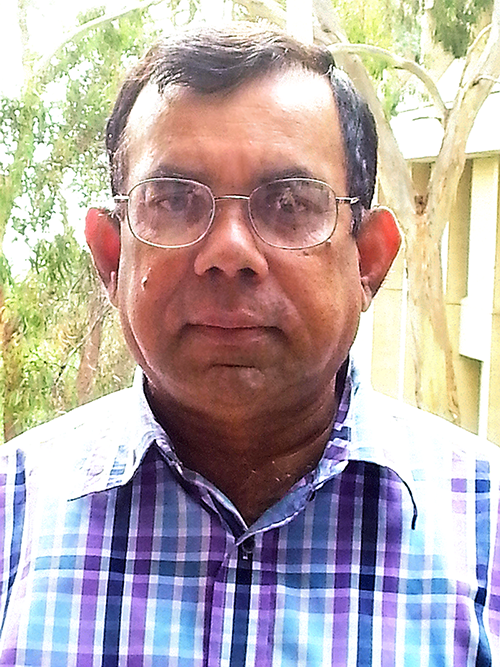
- Quayum in 2015
- Born: 30 June 1954 (age 71); Gopalganj, East Bengal, Dominion of Pakistan
- Occupations: academic, writer

Mohammad A. Quayum (born 30 June 1954) is an academic, writer, editor, critic and translator.

== Life ==
Quayum was born in Gopalganj, Bangladesh on 30 June 1954. He has taught at universities in Australia, Bangladesh, Malaysia, Singapore and the US, and is currently Professor of English at International Islamic University Malaysia, and adjunct professor in the College of Humanities, Arts and Social Sciences at Flinders University, and School of Education at the University of South Australia. He is the founding editor of Asiatic: IIUM Journal of English Language and Literature, and has to date published 34 books and more than 140 journal articles, book chapters and encyclopaedia entries in the areas of American literature, Bengali literature and Southeast Asian literature. Between 1993 and 2000 he served as co-editor of the journal World Literature Written in English (now Journal of Postcolonial Writing). He is on the advisory board of the Journal of Postcolonial Writing, Transnational Literature, Interdisciplinary Literary Studies: A Journal of Criticism and Theory, The Rupkatha Journal on Interdisciplinary Studies in Humanities, Journal of Postcolonial Cultures and Societies, Writing Today: International Journal of Studies in English and The Apollonian: A Journal of Interdisciplinary Studies. He is also on the editorial board of The Literary Encyclopedia.

Quayum is regarded as a leading critic of Malaysian-Singaporean literature and of the Bengali poet and Asia's first Nobel Laureate, Rabindranath Tagore.

== Selected books ==
Authored

- Beyond Boundaries: Critical Essays on Rabindranath Tagore. Dhaka: Bangla Academy, 2014. ISBN 984-07-5203-0.
- One Sky, Many Horizons: Studies in Malaysian Literature in English.Kuala Lumpur: Marshall Cavendish, 2007. ISBN 9789833845415
- Saul Bellow and American Transcendentalism. New York: Peter Lang, 2004. ISBN 0-8204-3652-6.
- Colonial to Global: Malaysian Women's Writing in English 1940s–1990s. Malaysia: IIUM Press, 2001 and 2003. ISBN 983-9727-38-9. (With Nor Faridah A. Manaf)
- Dictionary of Literary Terms. Kuala Lumpur: Prentice Hall, 2000. ISBN 983-9236-51-2.

Translated

- Atiqur Rahman: Selected Poems. Dhaka: Bangla Prakash, 2017. ISBN 978-9-8492677-3-7. (With S. Nahleen)
- The Revolutionary (Kazi Nazrul Islam's Kuhelika). Dhaka: Nymphea Press, 2016. ISBN 978-984-92297-1-1. (With Niaz Zaman)
- Rabindranath Tagore: The Ruined Nest and Other Stories. Kuala Lumpur: Silverfish Books, 2014. ISBN 9789833221486.
- The Essential Rokeya: Selected Works of Rokeya Sakhawat Hossain (1880–1932). Leiden, New York: Brill, 2013. ISBN 9789004255852.
- Rabindranath Tagore: Selected Short Stories. New Delhi: Macmillan, 2011. ISBN 0-230-33277-3.

Edited

- Bangladeshi Literature in English: Critical Essays and Interviews. London: Routledge, 2024. ISBN 9781032670355.
- The Postcolonial Millennium: New Directions in Malaysian Literature in English. London: Routledge, 2024. ISBN 1032669721. (with Grace Chin)
- Reading Malaysian Literature in English: Ethnicity, Gender, Diaspora, and Nationalism. Singapore: Springer, 2021. ISBN 978-981-16-5020-8.
- Bangladeshi Literature in English: A Critical Anthology. Dhaka: Asiatic Society of Bangladesh, 2021. ISBN 978-984-35-0677-1. (with Md. Mahmudul Hasan)
- Tagore, Nationalism and Cosmopolitanism: Perceptions, Contestations and Contemporary Relevance. UK: Routledge, 2020. ISBN 9780367218720.
- Malaysian Literature in English: A Critical Companion. UK: Cambridge Scholars Publishing, 2020). ISBN 978-1-5275-4929-6.
- Religion, Culture, Society: Readings in the Humanities and Revealed Knowledge. Kuala Lumpur: Silverfish Books, 2017. ISBN 9789833221646. (With Hassan Ahmed Ibrahim)
- A Feminist Foremother: Critical Essays on Rokeya Sakhawat Hossain. New Delhi: Orient Longman (Orient Blackswan), 2016. ISBN 9789386296009. (With Md. Mahmudul Hasan)
- Twenty-two New Asian Short Stories. Kuala Lumpur: Silverfish Books, 2016. ISBN 978-983-3221-52-3.
- The Poet and His World: Critical Essays on Rabindranath Tagore. New Delhi: Orient Longman. ISBN 978-81-250-4319-5.
- Imagined Communities Revisited: Critical Essays on Asia-Pacific Literatures and Cultures. Kuala Lumpur: IIUM Press, 2011. ISBN 978-967-4-18215-1. (With Nor Faridah A. Manaf)
- A Rainbow Feast: New Asian Short Stories. Singapore: Marshall Cavendish, 2010. ISBN 978-981-4302-71-5.
- Sharing Borders: Studies in Contemporary Singaporean-Malaysian Literature. Singapore: National Library Board in partnership with Singapore Arts Council, 2009. ISBN 978-981-08-3910-9. (With Wong Phui Nam)
- Peninsular Muse: Interviews with Modern Malaysian and Singaporean Poets, Novelists and Dramatists. Oxford, Bern: Peter Lang, 2007. ISBN 978-3-03911-061-2.
- The Merlion and the Hibiscus: Contemporary Short Stories from Singapore and Malaysia. Penguin Books, 2002. ISBN 0-14-302812-X.
- Singaporean Literature in English: A Critical Reader. Malaysia: University Putra Malaysia Press, 2002. ISBN 983-2373-50-6. (With Peter Wicks)
- Malaysian Literature in English: A Critical Reader. Kuala Lumpur: Pearson Education, 2001. ISBN 983-74-1956-3. (With Peter Wicks)
- Saul Bellow: The Man and His Work. New Delhi: B.R. Publishing, 2000. ISBN 81-7646-167-9. (With Sukhbir Singh)
- In Blue Silk Girdle: Stories from Malaysia and Singapore. Malaysia: University Putra Malaysia Press, 1998. ISBN 983-9319-45-0.

Festschrift

- Festschrift: The Poetry and Poetics of Shirley Geok-lin Lim, ed. Mohammad A. Quayum. The Journal of Transnational American Studies, Vol. 10, No. 2 (2019). .
