= Burmilla =

Breed of cat

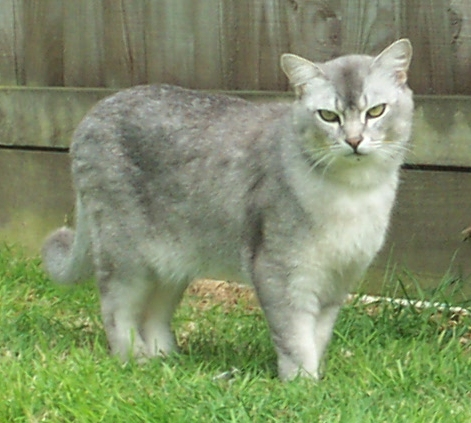
- A "blue" male Burmilla
- Other names: none
- Origin: United Kingdom

Breed standards
- CFA: standard
- FIFe: standard
- ACF: standard
- CCA-AFC: standard
- GCCF: standard

The Burmilla (a portmanteau of Burm-ese and Chinch-illa ) is a breed of domestic cat, that originated in the United Kingdom in 1981. It is a cross between the Chinchilla Persian and Burmese cats. In certain cat registries the breed falls under the Asian group, and is sometimes referred to as the Asian Shaded. Standards were produced in 1984, and the breed gained championship status in the United Kingdom in the 1990s.

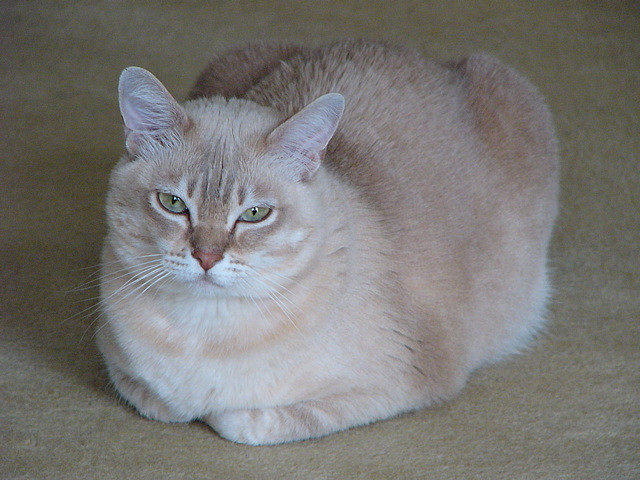
Lilac female

== History ==
=== Origin ===
The Burmilla was accidentally born in the cattery of Miranda von Kirchberg in the United Kingdom. Two cats, a chinchilla Persian kitten, called Jamari Sanquist, and a lilac Burmese, called Bambino Lilac Fabergé, were both awaiting a partner in different rooms. One night, the cleaner left the door open. The two cats mated, producing four kittens born in 1981. All four kittens were shorthair silver shaded females, named Galatea, Gemma, Gabriela, and Gisella. Impressed with the kittens' appearance, she called a friend and fellow breeder, Therese Clarke, who shared her excitement. The two would go on to develop the litter into a new breed, with Clarke adopting Gemma and von Kichberg keeping Galatea, with the two serving as the foundation for the breed's first lines.

Clarke formed the Burmilla Cat Club in 1984, with the Cat Association of Britain officially recognizing the breed in 1994. A year later in 1995, the GCCF accepted the Burmilla for championship.

=== Recognition ===
In GCCF (Governing Council of the Cat Fancy), the Burmilla is considered part of the Asian group. It is accepted in FIFe as the Burmilla. Only the silver shaded and tipped varieties have been recognised in GCCF, FIFe, CCCA, ACF and CFA. As of late 2011, additionally golden shaded and tipped Burmillas are recognised within FIFe. The ACF also recognises golden shaded and tipped.

=== Australian Tiffanie ===
One governing body in Australia (Australian National Cats Inc., ANCATS) uses the name Australian Tiffanie; however, international acceptance and standardisation did not follow. It is different from the European Tiffanie and the North-American Chantilly-Tiffany. The Tiffanie from the UK is also originating from crossbreeding chinchilla Persian and Burmese cats similar to the Burmilla, and is the semi-longhaired variety in the Asian Group. However, Australian Tiffanies are essentially longhair Burmillas, as they only come in silver or golden tipped or shaded. The breed is separately developed in the late-1990s in Australia from European Tiffanie cats by breeding them back to the chinchilla Persian. Therefore, many Australian Tiffanies contain more than three-quarters chinchilla Persian and retain the appearance and temperament of the Old-Fashioned chinchilla Persian. To summarise, the Australian Tiffanie and Tiffanie from the UK both are developed from crossbreeding chinchilla Persians and Burmeses, but the Australian version contains more chinchilla Persian. Consequently, only silver and golden tipped and shaded is allowed in the Australian Tiffanie. The name's use is declining in favour, due to the lax standards for the breed name, the lack of unique identity and the varied genetic makeup.

== Appearance ==
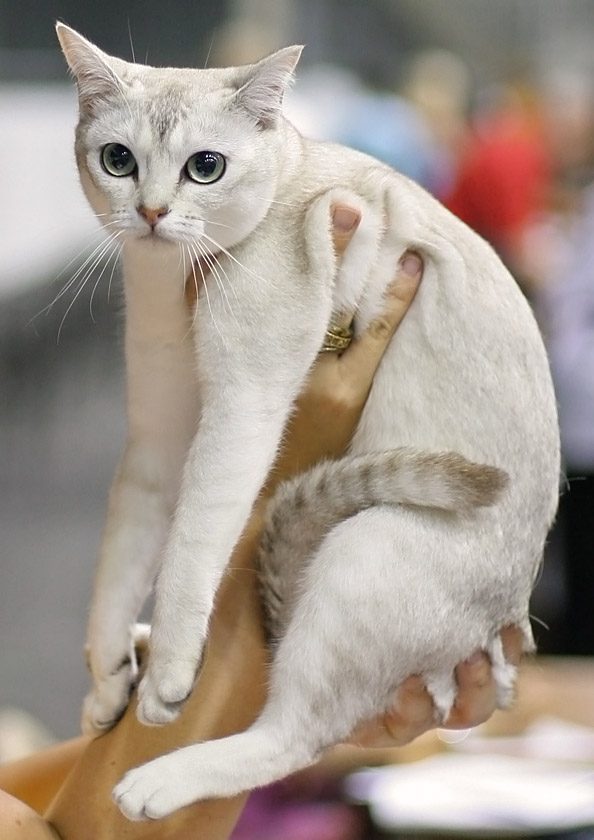
Black silver shaded female

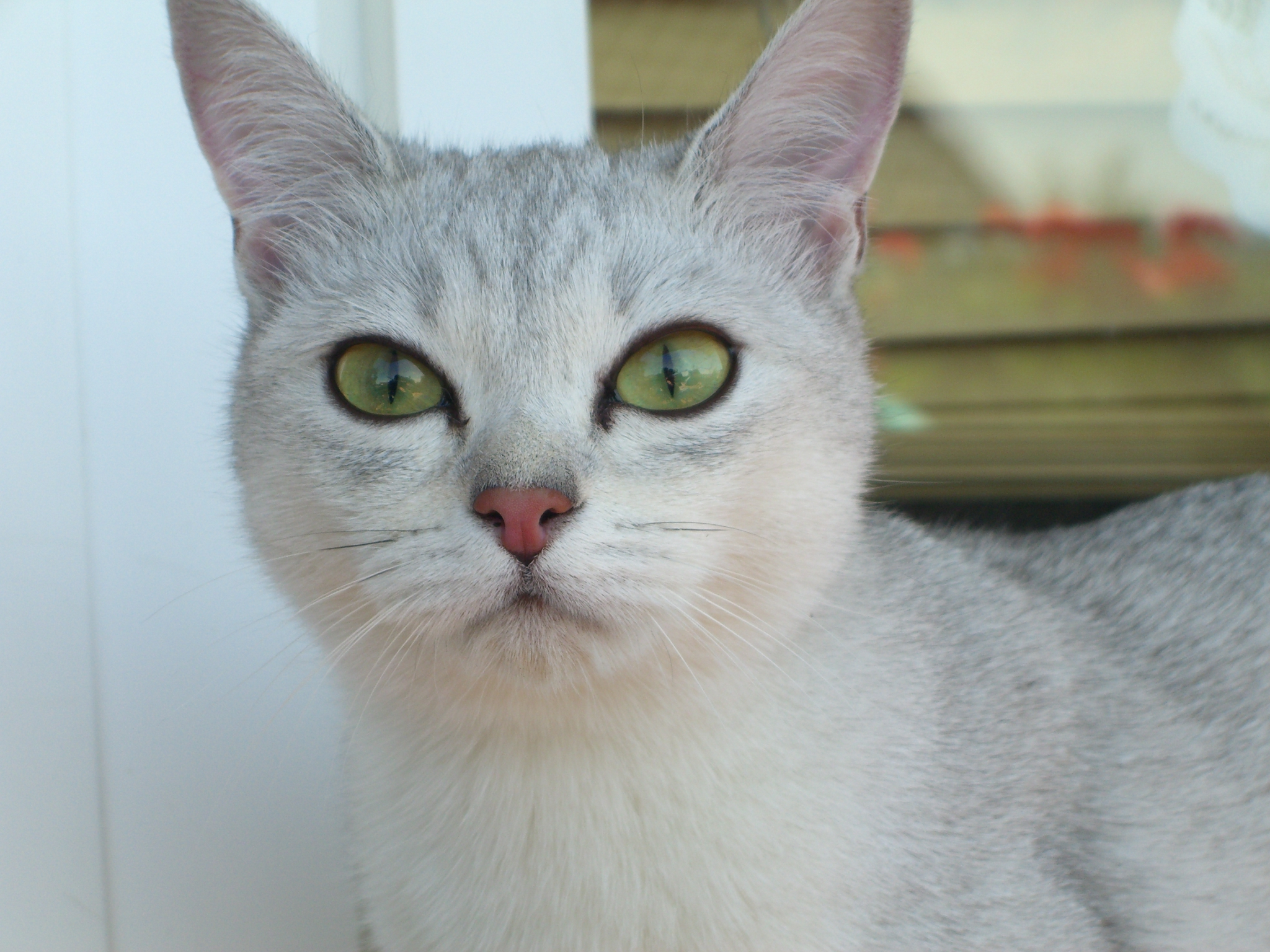
Black silver shaded

=== Body ===
Burmillas are medium-sized with muscular, elegant bodies, tending to weigh between 3–6 kg. Their distinguishing feature is their sparkling silver coat, and distinctive "make up" lining the nose, lips and eyes.

=== Head ===
Gently rounded top of head; medium width between ears; wide at eyebrow level and jaw hinge, tapering to a short, blunt wedge. The profile shows a gentle nose break. Tip of nose and chin should be in line. Chin is firm, with good depth.

=== Ears and eyes ===
Medium to large, broad at base with slightly rounded tips. Ear set with slight forward tilt in profile. Eye shape is large; placed well apart at slight oblique setting; slightly curved upper; line angled toward the nose, with a fuller curved lower line. Eye colour luminous, any shade of green. Some allowance can be made for a gold or yellow tinge in kittens and young adults.

=== Coat ===
The Burmilla comes in two coat lengths, semi-longhair and shorthair. Semi-longhair Burmilla are known as the Tiffanie in GCCF. The most common (standard) coat is the shorthair. This is a short, close-lying coat, similar in appearance to the Burmese, but with a slightly padded feel. Due to the undercoat, it has a soft, silky feel. The recessive longhair gene inherited from the Chinchilla Persian can produce longhair Burmilla. These cats have a semi-longhair coat following the lines of the body, with a soft, silky feel and a large plumed tail. The shorthair gene is dominant and where a cat receives one of each, shorthair dominates. Two longhair Burmillas mated together produce longhair kittens, while shorthair matings depend on whether the longhair genes are carried by the shorthair parents.

=== Colours ===
The Burmilla sports a variety of coat colours, including black, blue, brown, chocolate and lilac. Red, cream and tortoiseshell (calico) varieties have been bred, although these colours are not recognised by CCCA in Australia. Burmilla coat colours can be expressed in either Burmese expression, or full expression. The Burmilla is now recognised in golden shaded and golden tipped in FIFe and ACF registries, but only silver shaded and silver tipped elsewhere. The Burmilla's shading comes in two major coat patterns which relate to the depth of colour; these are tipped and shaded. Tipped Burmillas have a light dusting of colour (1/8 to 1/4) over the top of a silver or golden undercoat. In the case of silvers, these cats can appear almost white. Shaded Burmillas have 1/4 - 1/2 of their hair length pigmented, giving the appearance of a mantle of colour over the back, shoulders and outside of the legs. The smoke pattern is not a Burmilla (in GCCF these fall under the Asian Smoke-category), and in some registries is only allowed to be registered for breeding, not showing. Smokes have only a small part of the hair root in the silvery-white or golden colour, and almost all hair length is pigmented. The cats have nose leather coloured correspondingly to their coat colour and outlined in the matching coat shading colour. In addition, their paw footpads correspond to the coat colouring: black silver cats have black or dark brown paw footpads, browns (sepia blacks) have dark brown, chocolates have pinkish brown, blues have blue-grey, and lilacs have dove-grey tinged with pink.

=== Colour genetics ===
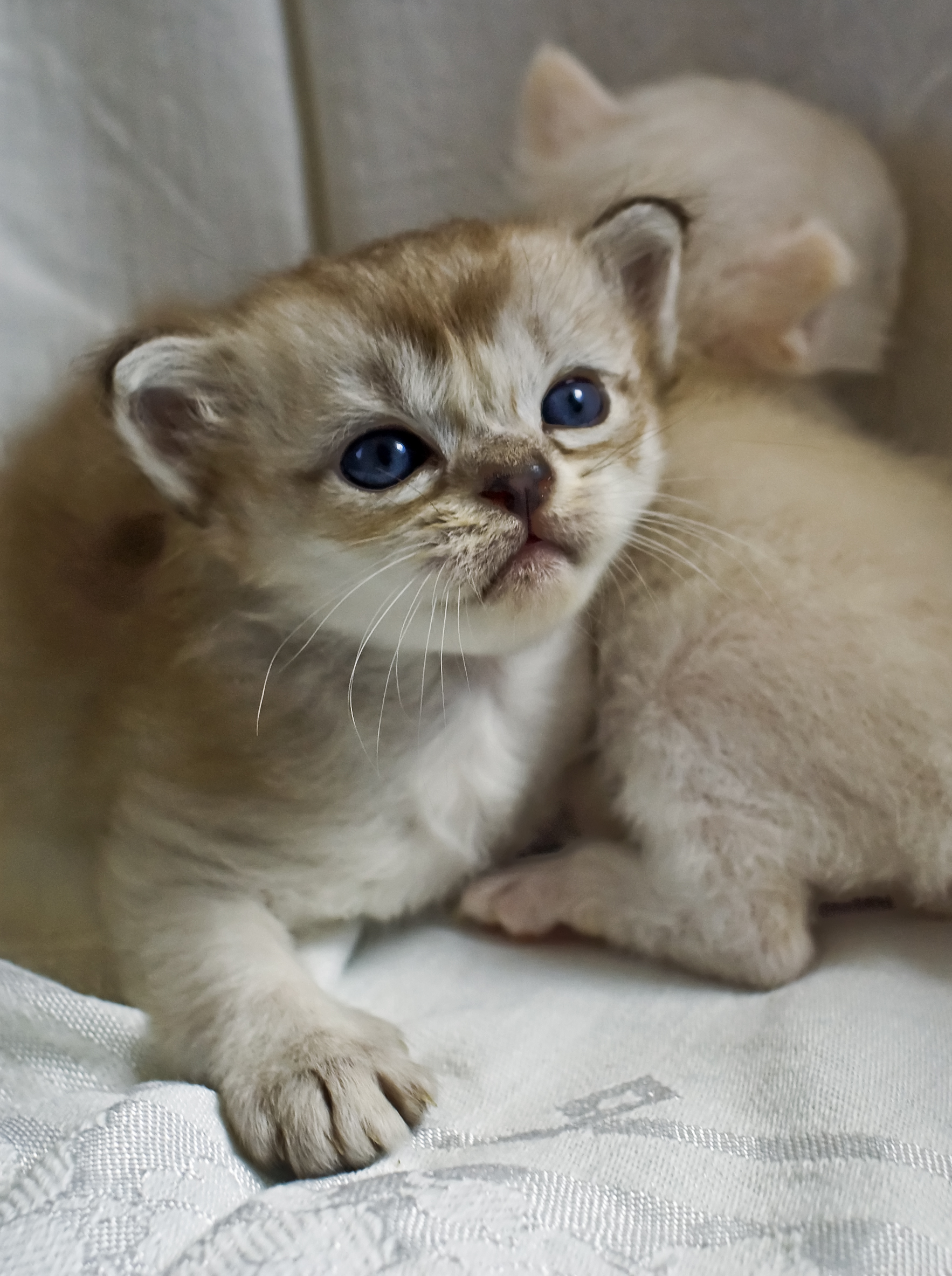
Burmilla kittens

Since the Burmilla inherits its colour ranges from two breeds, there is also the possibility of the entire Burmese spectrum of colours; black (incl. brown or sepia black), blue, chocolate, lilac and all the O gene range, both in Burmese Expression or BCR (sepia coloured), and in Full Expression or FEx (solid/self coloured). The inheritance of the silver-gene also means that expression of colour can be variable; silver can darken and cool colour. However, since the Burmilla has a shaded coat pattern, it can be difficult to identify the various subtle shades of Burmese colouring that are recessive to the Persian colouring.

== Temperament ==
The Burmilla is generally a breed that is irreverent and independent cat who adores its owner and displays many kitten-like characteristics, even into adulthood. In temperament they usually are sociable, playful and affectionate and get along well with children and other animals.
