= Asian cat =

Asian
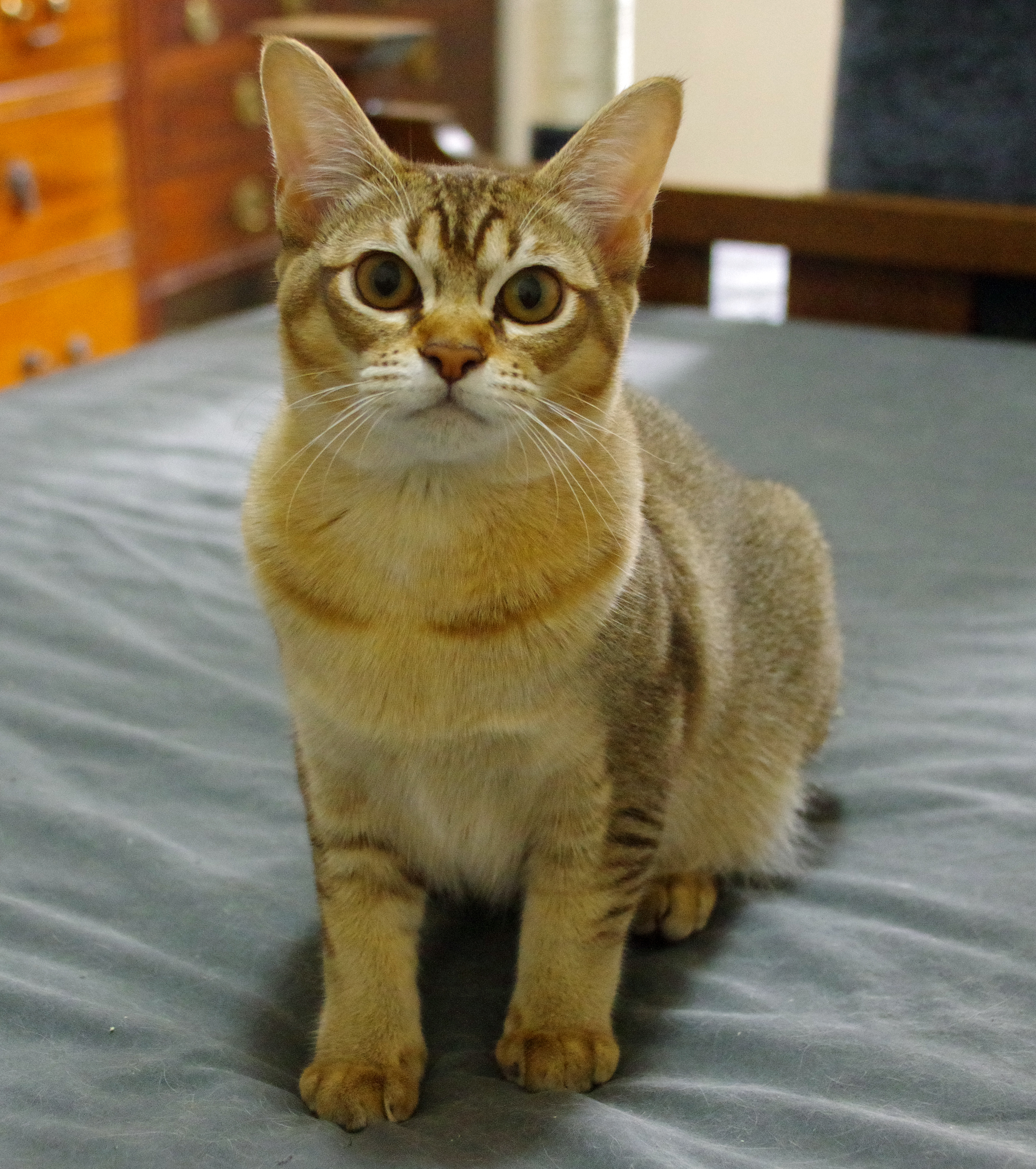
- Cinnamon ticked Asian Tabby
- Origin: Developed in the United Kingdom

Breed standards
- GCCF: standard
- LOOF: standard

Notes
- The Asian cat is sometimes incorrectly referred to as the 'Malayan' cat, however this refers to the blue, chocolate and lilac varieties of Burmese cats in CFA during the years 1974 to 1984.

The Asian or Asian group, is a cat breed similar to the European Burmese, but comes in a range of different coat colours and patterns. Long-haired Asians of all varieties are called Tiffanies. Asians are grouped in section 5 (Burmese) by the Governing Council of the Cat Fancy (GCCF).

== History ==
=== Origin ===
The breed was accidentally developed in the United Kingdom, starting with a litter of 4 kittens resulting from a mismating of a chinchilla Persian stud, Jamari Sanquist, and a lilac European Burmese queen, Bambino Lilac Faberge, bred in 1981 by Baroness Miranda von Kirchberg.

=== Breed recognition ===
After the first litter of kittens were born in 1981, breeders believed the kittens showed potential to become their own breed. Early breeders decided the phenotype of the kittens was to be exactly the same as the Burmese, but in more colours and varieties. All varieties gained championship status with the GCCF in 2003, with the Tiffanie being the last variety to gain it.

The Asian group is a relatively rare breed among pedigree cats. In 2023, only 160 kittens of the entire Asian group were pedigreed with the GCCF.

== Asian group ==
In appearance, the Asian group is essentially identical to the Burmese breed, but they come in more colours and patterns, and in the case of the Tiffanies (Asian semi-longhairs), longer fur. Smoke is the term used for self/solid coloured silvers (uniform distribution), while shaded and tipped silvers are silver tabbies (distribution in tabby pattern) with 'wide banding'. The Asian group incorporates the:

- Asian Self (self/solid and tortoiseshell),
  - Bombay (self/solid black),
- Asian Shaded or Burmilla (silver or golden shaded and tipped),
- Asian Smoke (smoke),
- Asian Tabby (tabby), and
- Tiffanie or Asian (semi-)longhair (longhair variety).
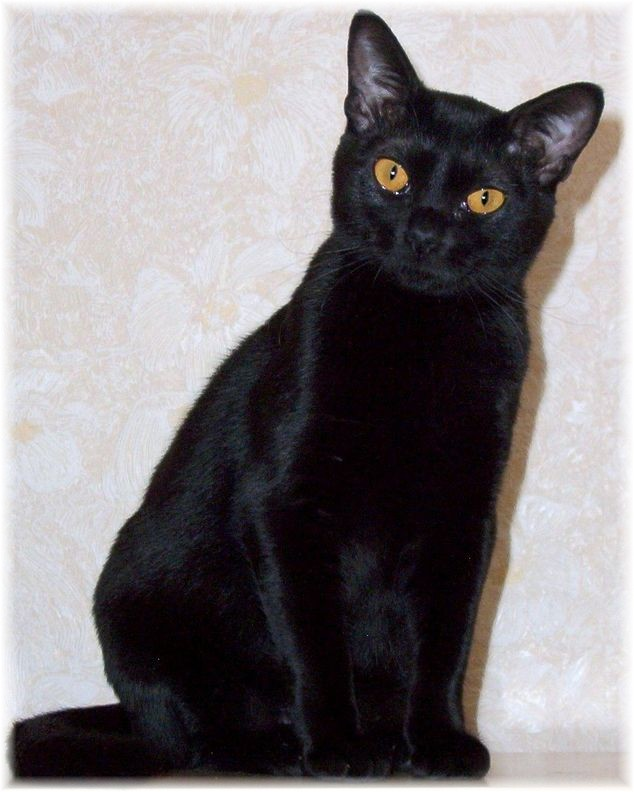
Asian Self (Bombay)

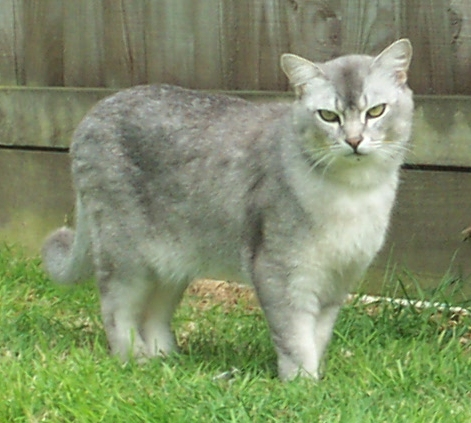
Asian Shaded (Burmilla)

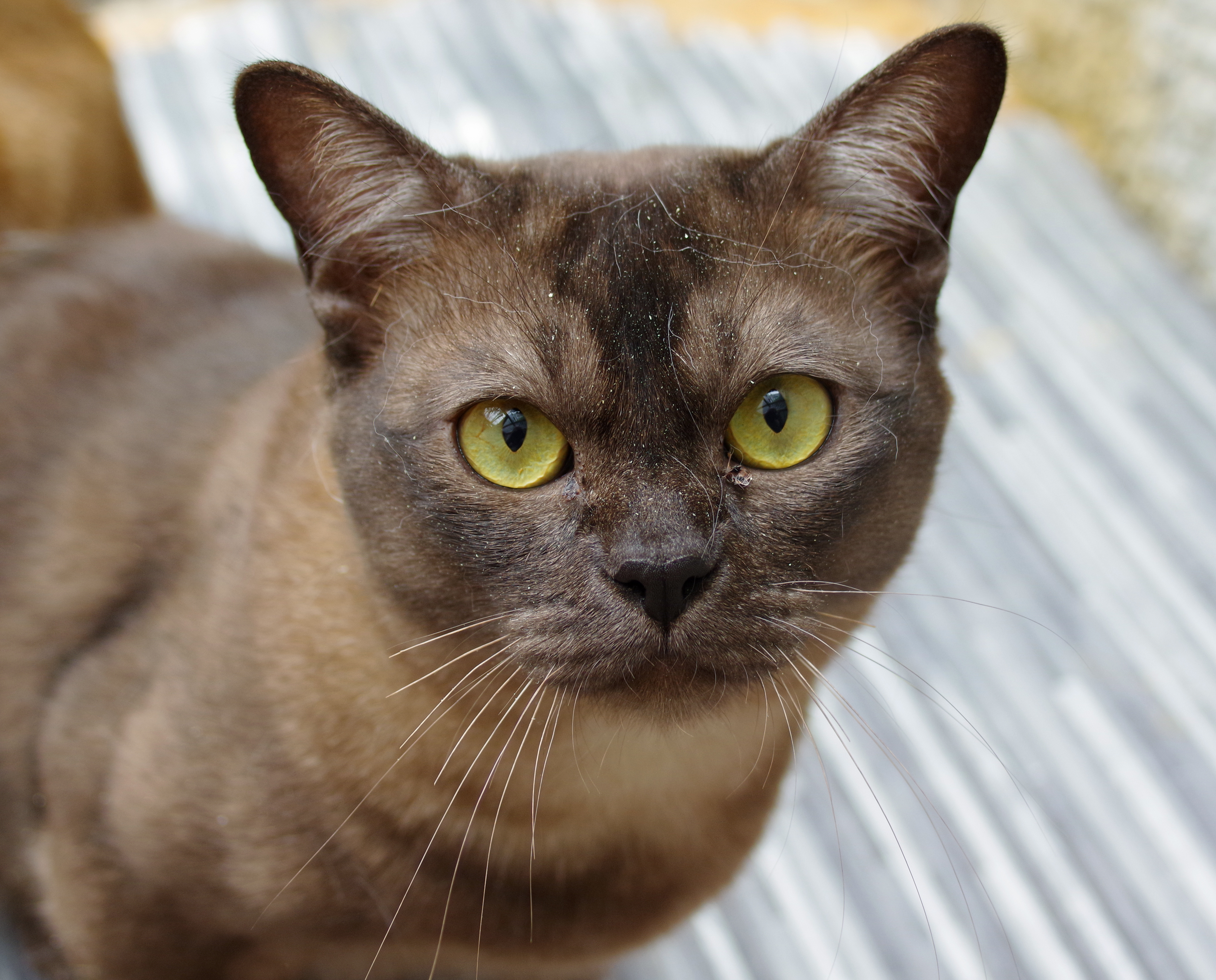
Asian Smoke

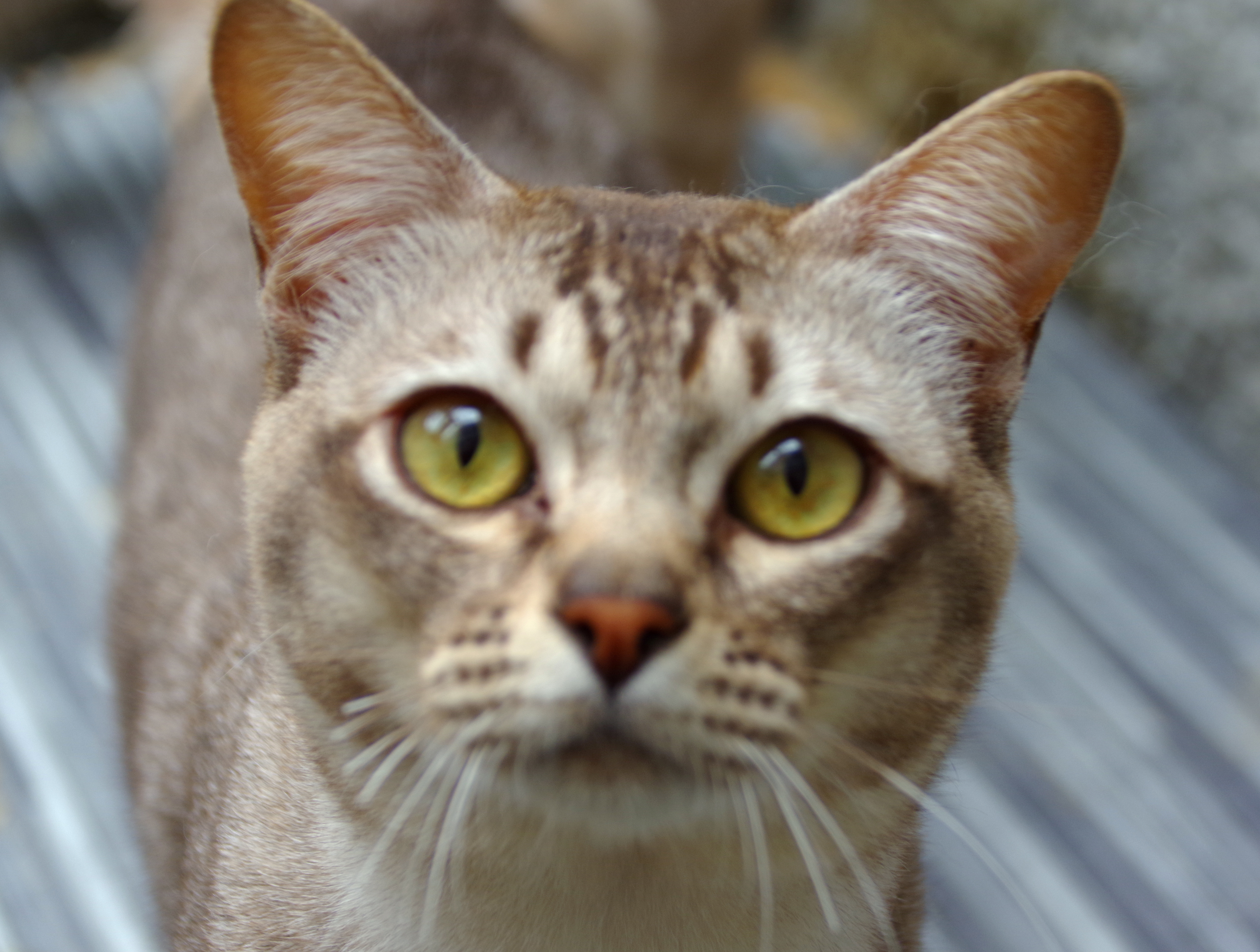
Asian Tabby

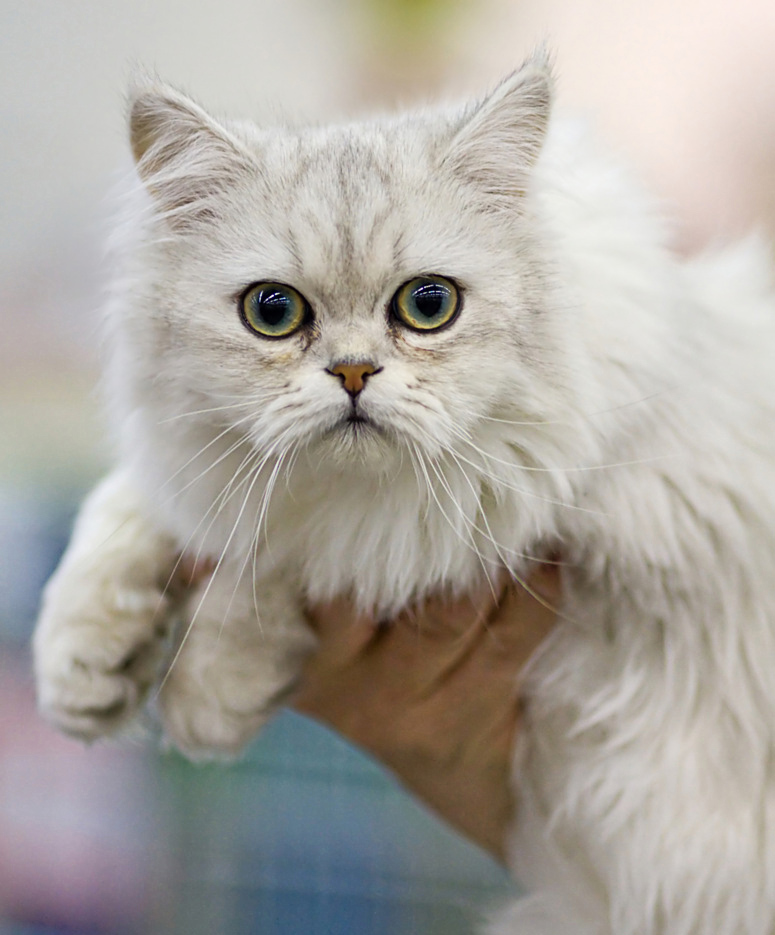
Tiffanie (semi-longhair)

=== Asian Smoke ===
The Asian Smoke is a non-agouti cat with a white undercoat that is not always noticeable. When the Asian was originally being developed Burmillas were bred with Burmese. These cats were given the name 'Burmoire' due to the moire-like effect of their coats – this look is now considered undesirable for the Asian Smoke.

=== Asian Shaded ===
The Asian Shaded (also known as the Burmilla) has two colours at the tip and at the root of their fur.

=== Asian Tabby ===
The Asian Tabby is an Asian cat with tabby markings. However unlike regular tabbies the coat has a reduced melanin concentration which results in lighter tabby markings. Asian Tabbies come in all four traditional tabby markings and most tabby colourings.

=== Bombay ===
The solid black Bombay under the Asian Self-category has a slightly different origin, but is also developed in the UK. In the early 1980s, the resulting kittens of three mismatings of European Burmese with black domestic short-haired cats were developed into the British-type Bombay.

Additionally, there exists another variant of the Bombay cat, the relatively more popular American-type Bombay developed in the United States. American-type Bombays were developed by crossbreeding sable American Burmese and black American Shorthair cats, to produce a cat of mostly Burmese type, but with a sleek, panther-like black coat and exclusively with bright copper-golden eyes. For the British-type Bombay golden eyes are preferred, but yellow to green is acceptable, with the preference given to greater depth of colour. The GCCF is the sole registry that recognises the British Bombay and operates in the UK.

=== Tiffanie ===
The Tiffanie (unrelated to the Chantilly-Tiffany) also known as the Asian Semi-longhair is an Asian cat with medium to long length hair.

== Description ==
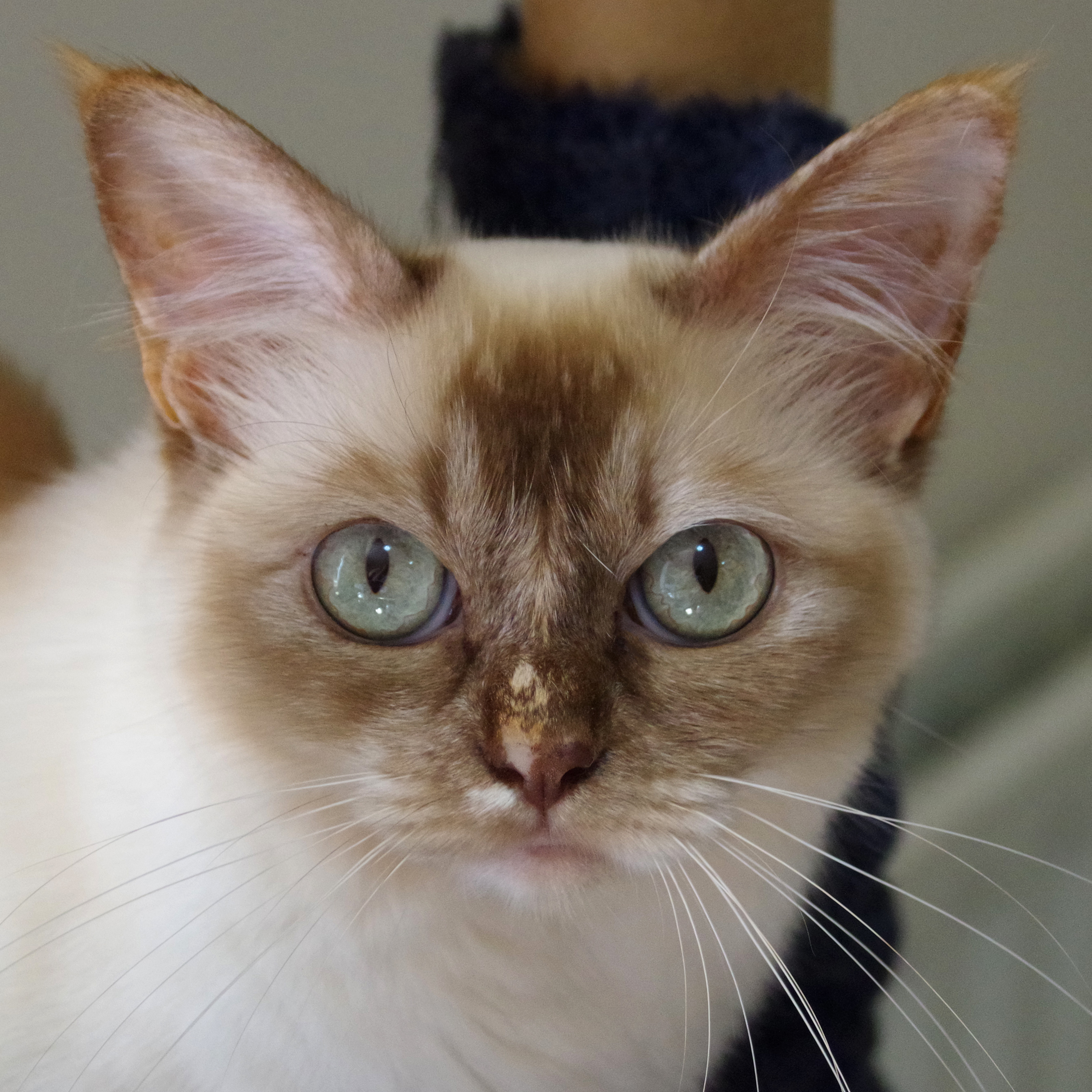
Face close-up

=== Appearance ===
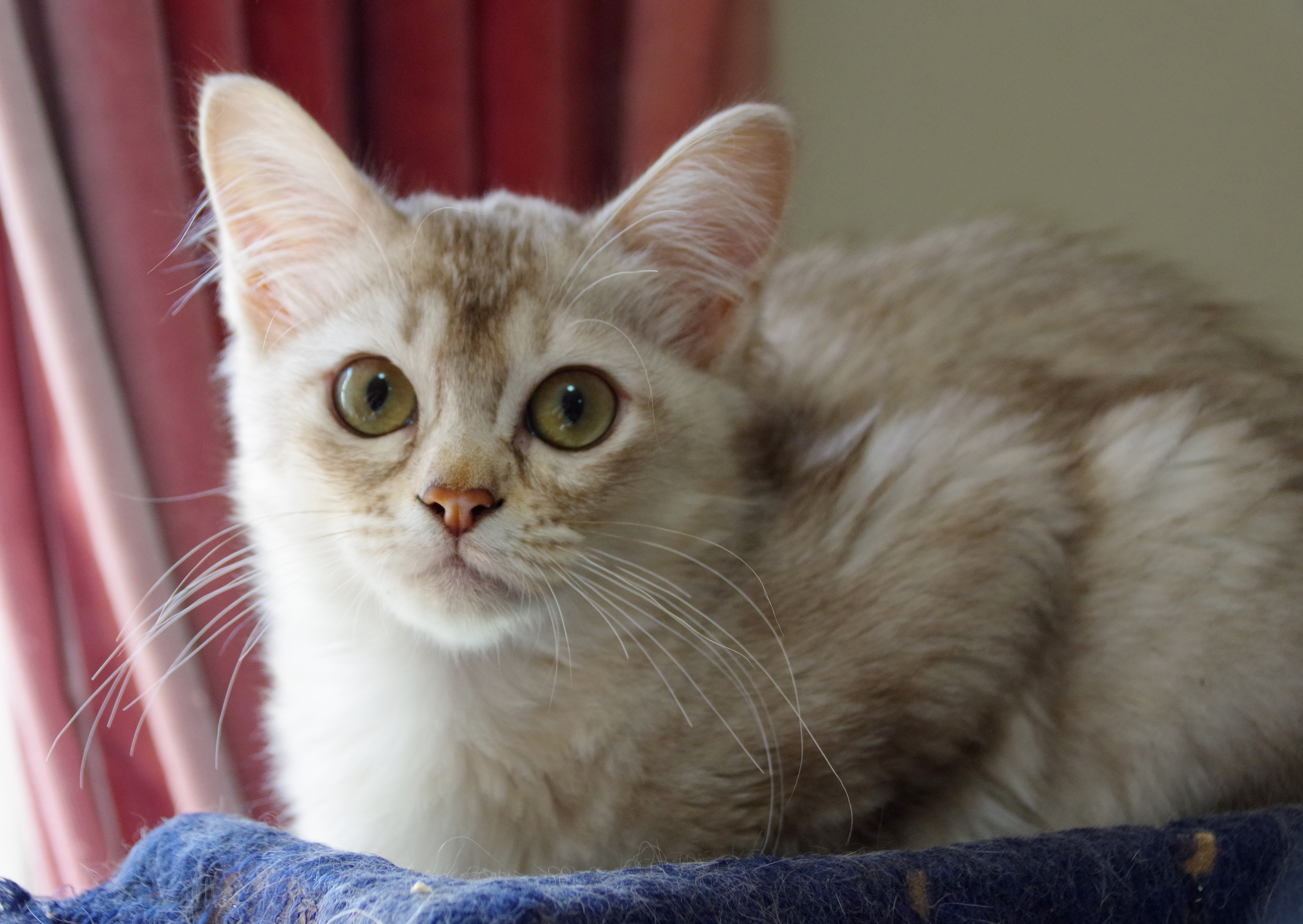
Chocolate silver shaded Tiffanie / Asian Semi-longhair

==== Body ====
Male Asians typically weigh around 5–7 kg (11–15 lbs), females weigh slightly less with a typical weight between 3.5–5.5 kg (8–12 lbs). They should not be cobby and should be similar to the Burmese in type; with a slender and muscular body.

==== Head ====
The head should form a short, wide, and well balanced wedge while being in proportion to the body. The top of the head should be gently rounded between the ears, which should be spaced apart. There should be a distinct nose break; with the nose being straight. The chin should be firm with a good depth. The neck should be of medium length and width.

==== Ears ====
Ears should be medium to large in size, with rounded tips and a slight forward tilt. Tufts of fur in the ear are preferable for the Tiffanie.

==== Eyes ====
Eyes should be large and spread apart with the colour ranging from green to yellow and amber.

==== Legs and Paws ====
The legs should be slender and of medium length in proportion to the body, with the hind legs longer than the front legs. Paws should be neat with an oval shape.

==== Tail ====
The tail should be medium or long in length with a rounded tip.

==== Coat and colours ====
The short-haired coat of the Asian should lie close to the body and is fine, satiny and glossy, and can be multiple colours and patterns. Asian Shorthairs are classified in four different varieties: the Asian Self/Tortie (including the Bombay, which is a black Asian Self), the Asian Tabby, the Asian Smoke, and the Burmilla (which is a shaded Asian).

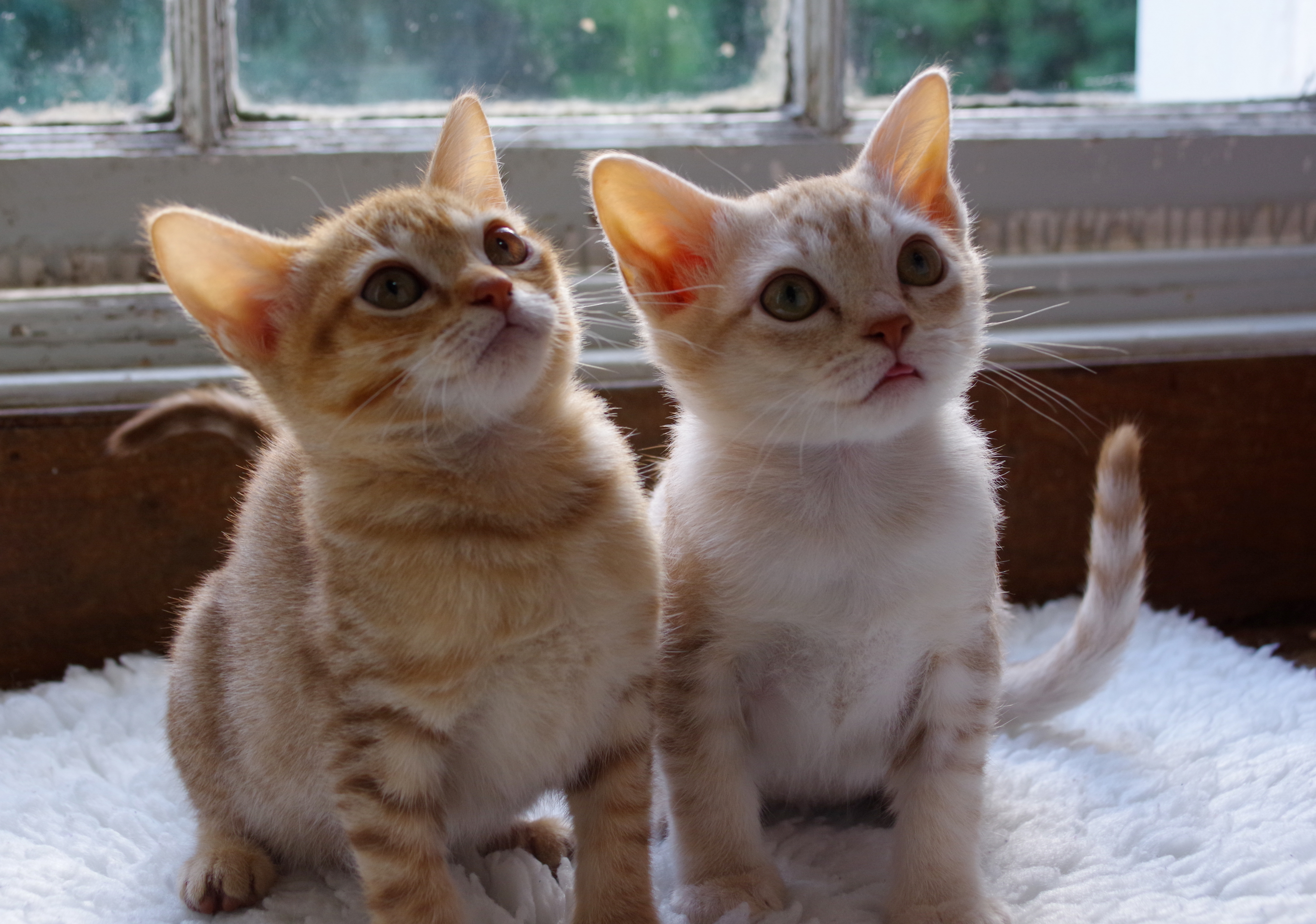
Two Asian Tabby kittens: cinnamon spotted (left) and cinnamon silver spotted (right)

== Health ==
Ancestral breeds of the Asian have been known to carry Polycystic Kidney Disease and Progressive retinal atrophy, however, only Burmese Hypokalaemia has been identified in the Asian.

Many Asian breeders and their cats were involved in the research into the disease, and as of 2018 all registered breeders with the Asian Cat Association are required to test for hypokalaemia for all Asian group cats intended for use in breeding.

== See also ==
- Asian Semi-longhair
- Burmese cat
- Chantilly-Tiffany
- List of cat breeds
