= Asiatic (journal) =

- Discipline: English language, English literature
- Language: English
- Edited by: Md. Mahmudul Hasan

Publication details
- History: 2007–present
- Publisher: International Islamic University Malaysia (Malaysia)
- Frequency: Biannually
- Open access: Yes
- License: Creative Commons Attribution 4.0 International

Standard abbreviations
- ISO 4: Asiatic

Indexing
- ISSN: 1985-3106
- OCLC no.: 433682812

Links
- Journal homepage; Online access; Online archives

Asiatic: IIUM Journal of English Language and Literature is a biannual peer-reviewed academic journal published by the International Islamic University Malaysia and focusing on literary and linguistics works by Asian and Asian diaspora writers. The journal's founding editor-in-chief is Mohammad A. Quayum (International Islamic University Malaysia and Flinders University). The journal's current editor-in-chief is Prof. Md. Mahmudul Hasan (International Islamic University Malaysia). Each issue has sections covering critical writings, creative writing, and reviews and review articles on books, novels, and plays on Asian topics written in English.

== Abstracting and indexing ==
The journal is abstracted and indexed in the MLA International Bibliography, EBSCO databases, Scopus, and the Emerging Sources Citation Index.

== Article Processing Fee ==
The journal requires authors to pay an amount of RM1,000 ($241.55) as article processing fee upon acceptance of an article for publication.
