= Burmese cat =

Breed of domestic cat

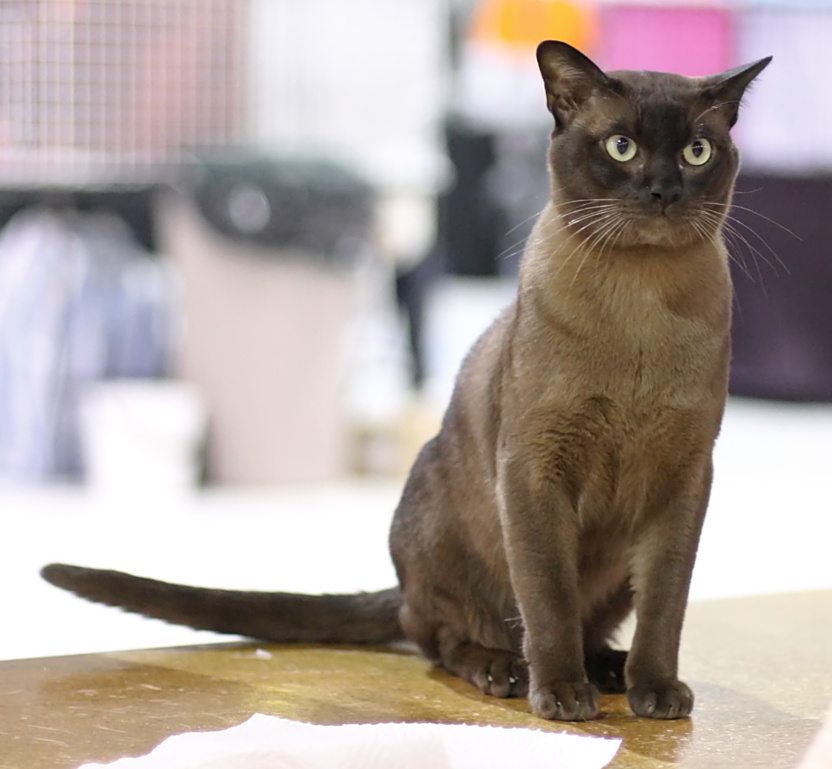
- Brown European male
- Origin: Burma; United Kingdom; United States
- Foundation bloodstock: brown sepia cat population in Burma (Myanmar)

Breed standards
- CFA: standard
- FIFe: standard
- TICA: standard
- WCF: standard
- ACF: standard
- CCA-AFC: standard
- GCCF: standard
- NZCF: standard

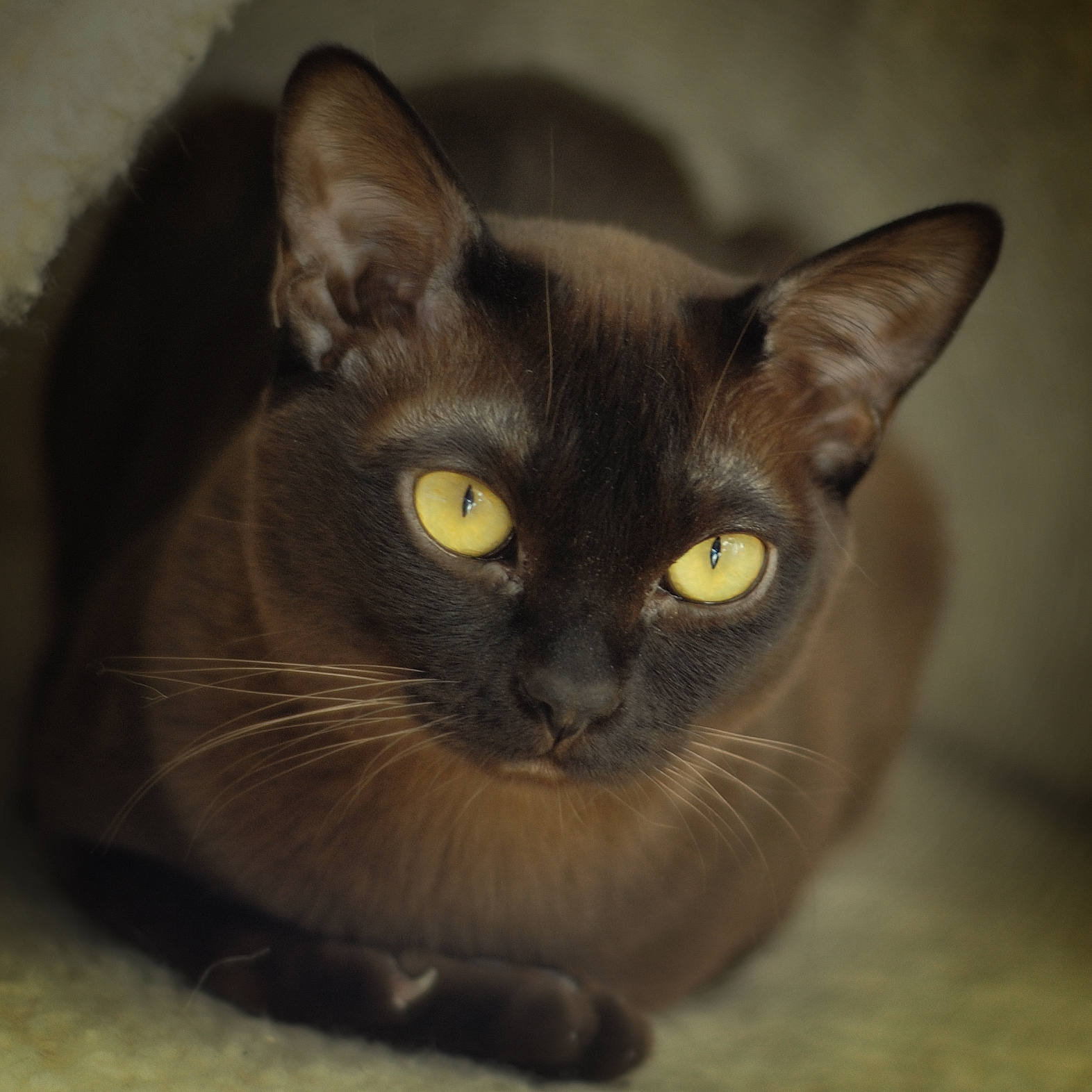
A brown European adult showing the original colouration of the breed

The Burmese cat (Burmese: ဗမာကြောင်, Băma kyaung, Thai: แมวพม่า or Suphalak, RTGS: Thongdaeng or Supphalak, meaning copper colour) is a pedigreed breed of domestic cat, originating in Burma, believed to have its roots near the Thai–Burma border, and developed by selective breeding in the United States and Britain.

Most modern Burmese are descendants of one female cat called Wong Mau, which was brought from Burma to the United States in 1930 and bred with American Siamese. From there, American and British breeders developed distinctly different Burmese breed standards, which is unusual among pedigreed domestic cats. Most modern cat registries do not formally recognise the two as separate breeds, but those that do refer to the British type as the European Burmese.

Originally, all Burmese cats were dark brown, genetically called black sepia, but are now available in a wide variety of sepia colours; formal recognition of these also varies by standard. Both versions of the breed are known for their uniquely social and playful temperament and persistent vocalisation.

== History ==
In 1871, Harrison Weir organised a cat show at the Crystal Palace, London. A pair of Siamese cats were on display that closely resembled modern American Burmese cats in build, thus probably similar to the modern Tonkinese breed. The first attempt to deliberately develop the Burmese in the late 19th century in Britain resulted in what were known as chocolate Siamese rather than a breed in their own right; this view persisted for many years, encouraging crossbreeding between Burmese and Siamese in an attempt to more closely conform to the Siamese build. The breed thus slowly died out in Britain.

Joseph Cheesman Thompson imported Wong Mau, a dark female cat, into San Francisco, USA, in 1930. Thompson considered the cat's build to be sufficiently different from the Siamese to still have potential as a fully separate breed. Wong Mau was bred with Tai Mau, a seal point Siamese, and then bred with her son to produce dark brown kittens that became the foundation of a new, distinctive strain of Burmese. In 1936, the Cat Fanciers' Association (CFA) granted the breed formal recognition. However, due to continued extensive outcrossing with Siamese cats to increase the population, the original type was overwhelmed, and the CFA suspended breed recognition a decade later. Attempts by various US breeders to refine the unique Burmese standard persisted, however, and in 1954, the CFA lifted the suspension permanently. In 1958, the United Burmese Cat Fanciers (UBCF) compiled an US judging standard that has remained essentially unchanged since its adoption.

Meanwhile, in the UK, interest in the breed was reviving. The cats that composed the new British breeding program were of a variety of builds, including some imported from the United States. By 1952, three true generations had been produced in Britain and the breed was recognised by the United Kingdom's Governing Council of the Cat Fancy (GCCF). Since the 1950s, countries in the Commonwealth and Europe started importing British Burmese; as a result, most countries have based their standard on the British model.

Historically, the two versions of the breed were kept strictly distinct genetically. European Burmese (also known as "traditional") were declassed as a breed by the CFA in the 1980s. The GCCF banned the registration of all Burmese imported from the United States in order to preserve the "traditional" bloodlines. Most modern cat registries do not formally recognise these dual standards as representing separate breeds, but those that do refer to the British type as the European Burmese. Recently, The International Cat Association (TICA) and CFA clubs have started using the American breed standard at select shows in Europe.

During the early period of breed development, it became clear that Wong Mau herself was genetically a crossbreed between a Siamese and Burmese type. This early crossbreed type was later developed as a separate breed, known today as the Tonkinese. Burmese cats have also been instrumental in the development of the Bombay and the Burmilla, among others.

== Description ==
Side facial profile comparison

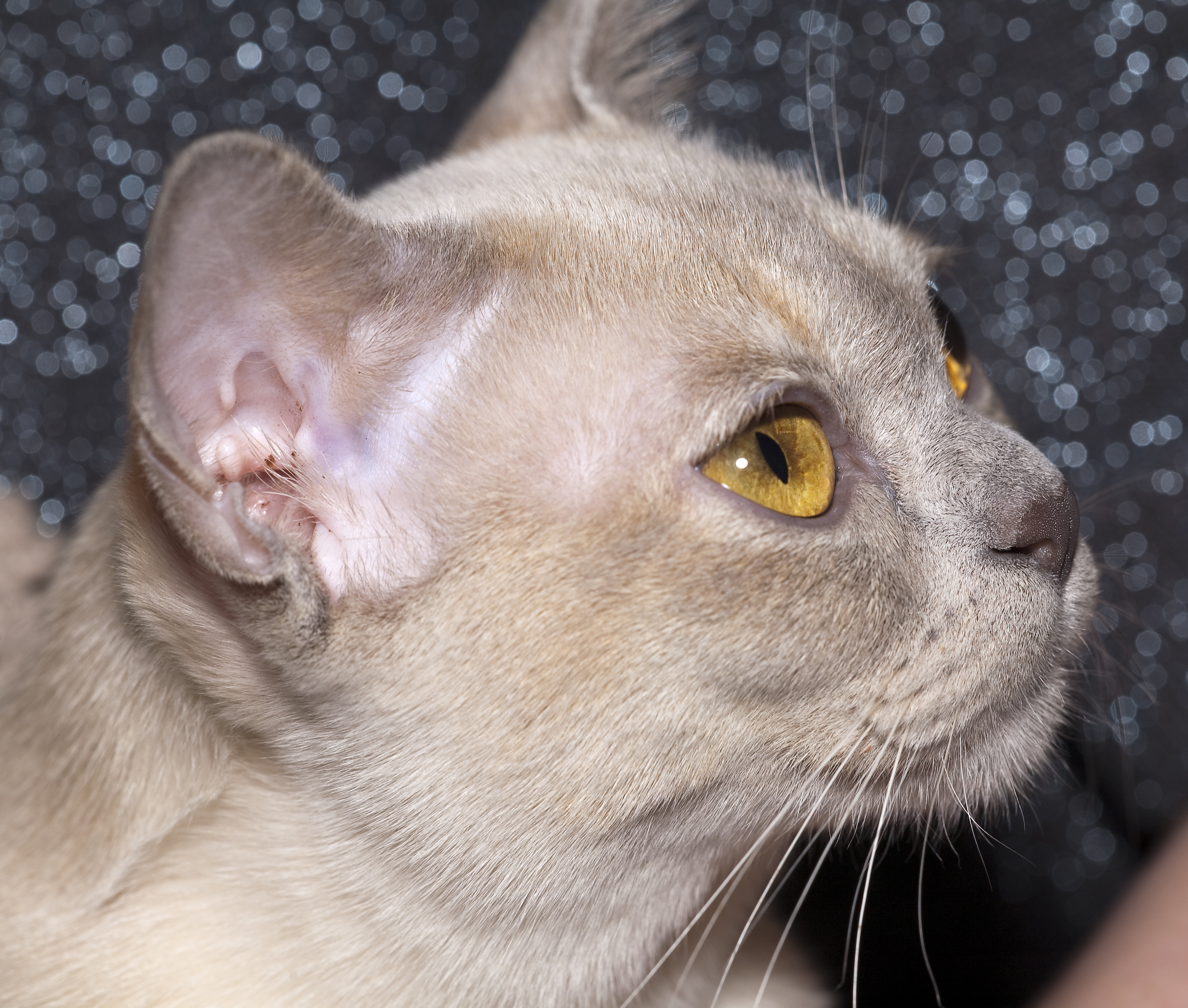
Lilac tortoiseshell American adult

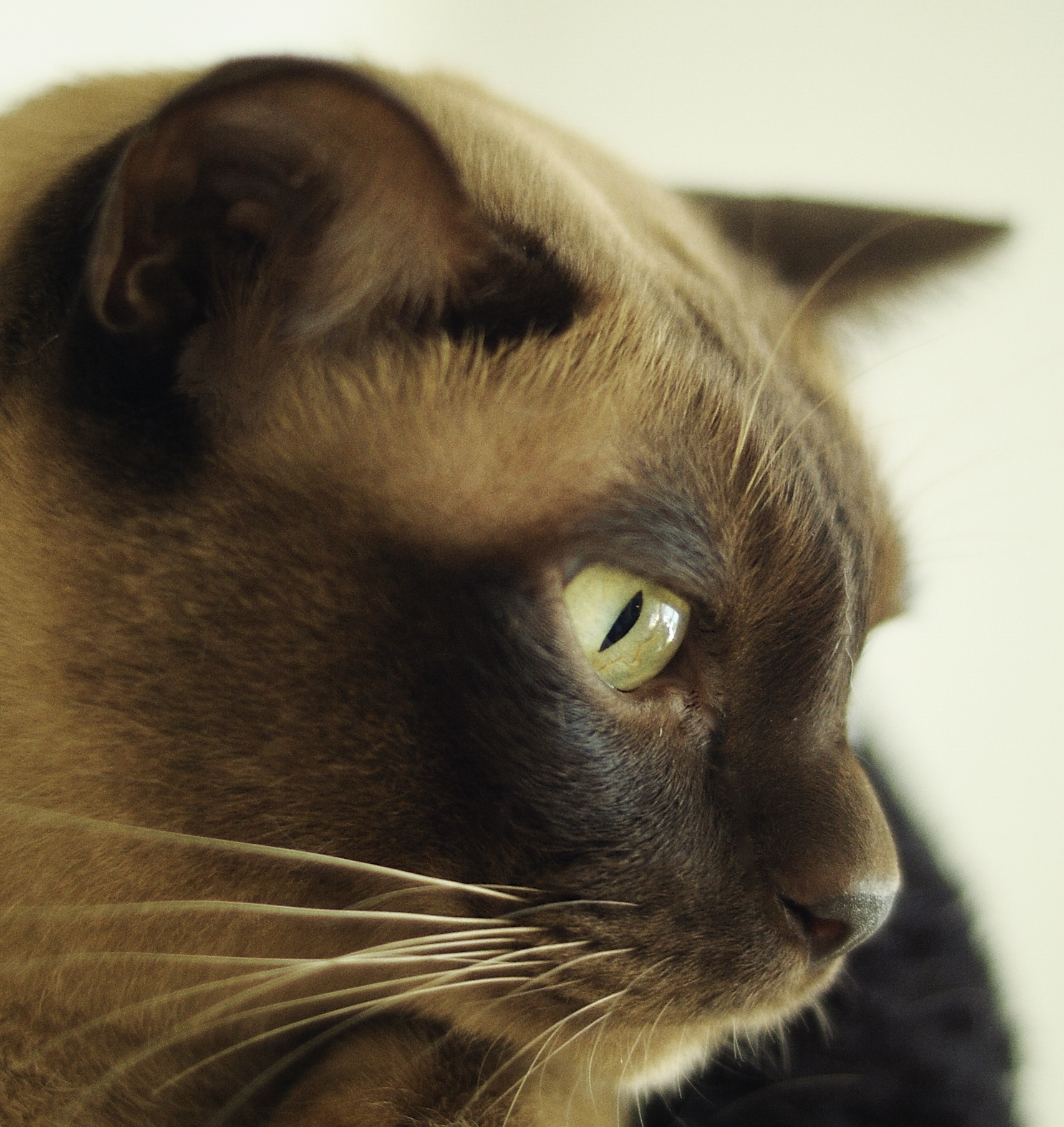
Chocolate European adult

Body shape comparison

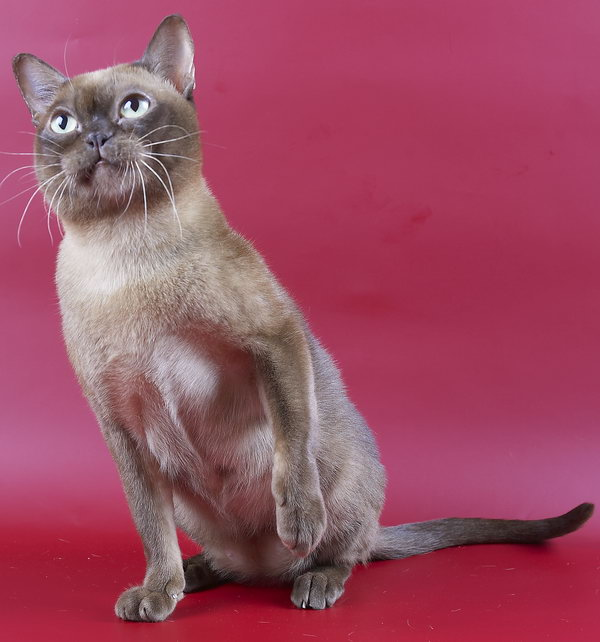
Chocolate American adult

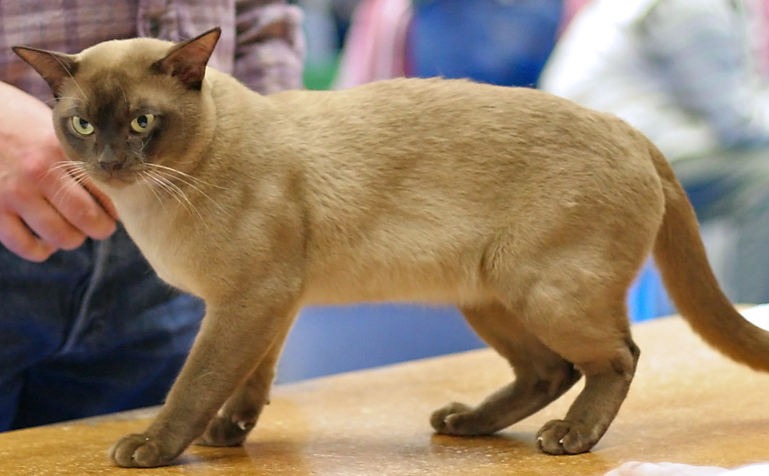
Chocolate European adult

=== Appearance ===
The two standards differ mainly in head and body shape. The British or traditional ideal tends toward a more slender, long-bodied cat with a wedge-shaped head, large pointed ears, long tapering muzzle and moderately almond-shaped eyes. The legs should likewise be long, with neat oval paws. The tail tapers to medium length. The American (also called "contemporary") Burmese is a noticeably stockier cat, with a much broader head, round eyes and distinctively shorter, flattened muzzle; the ears are wider at the base. Legs and tail should be proportionate to the body, medium-length, and the paws also rounded.

In either case, Burmese are a small to medium size breed, tending to be about 4–6 kg (9–13 lb), but are nevertheless substantially-built, muscular cats and should feel heavy for their size when held – "a brick wrapped in silk".

=== Coat and colour ===
In either standard, the coat should be very short, fine and glossy, with a satin-like finish. Colour is solid and must be uniform over the body, only gradually shading to lighter underparts. Faint colourpoint markings may be visible, but any barring or spotting is considered a serious fault. The eyes are green or gold depending on coat colour.

Overview of Burmese colouration terminology (in English)
Genetic colour	USA	UK, Australia	New Zealand
black	sable	brown	seal
chocolate	champagne	chocolate	
lilac	platinum	lilac	

The breed's original standard colour is a distinctively rich dark brown colour (genetically black), variously known as sable (USA), brown (UK, Australia) or seal (New Zealand). It is the result of the Burmese gene (c^{b}c^{b}). This gene causes a reduction in the amount of pigment produced, converting black into warm brown on the non-pointed parts (torso), and similarly rendering all other coat colours paler than their usual expression.

The first blue Burmese was born in 1955 in Britain, followed by red, cream, and tortoiseshell over the next decades. Chocolate first appeared in the United States. Lilac, the last major variant to appear, was likewise developed in the USA beginning in 1971. Currently, the British GCCF standard recognises solid brown, chocolate, blue, lilac, red, and cream, as well as the tortoiseshell pattern on a base of brown, chocolate, blue or lilac.

In the USA, chocolate, blue, and lilac cats were first formally considered a separate breed, the Malayan, in 1979. This distinction was abolished in 1984, but until 2010, the CFA continued to place the brown (sable) Burmese into a separate division, bundling all other recognised colours into a "dilute division" and judging them separately. Currently, the CFA standard still recognises the Burmese only in sable, blue, chocolate, and lilac.

Other colours have been developed from this initial base set, with varying degrees of popularity and recognition. In 1989 a cinnamon breeding programme was started in the Netherlands; the first fawn kitten was born in 1998. Cinnamon, fawn, caramel, and apricot Burmese have also been developed in New Zealand, as have tortoiseshell variants of all these colours. A new colour mutation ("russet") appeared in New Zealand in 2007. This line has an initially dark pigment in the cats' coats, which fades as they grow, eventually becoming a paler orange colour.

=== Behaviour ===
Burmese are a notably people-oriented breed, maintaining their kitten-like energy and playfulness into adulthood. They are also said to have a number of overtly puppy-like characteristics, forming strong bonds with their owners and gravitating toward human activity. The cats often learn to play games such as 'fetch' and 'tag'. Veterinarian Joan O. Joshua has written that the "dog-like attachment to the owners" of the Burmese, as with the similarly behaving Abyssinians, causes "greater dependence on human contacts". This stands in contrast to the mere "tolerant acceptance of human company" based around "comforts" that other breeds display. They are persistently vocal, in a manner reminiscent of their Siamese ancestry, yet they have softer, sweeter voices. Burmese are not as independent as other breeds and are not suited to being left alone for extended periods of time.

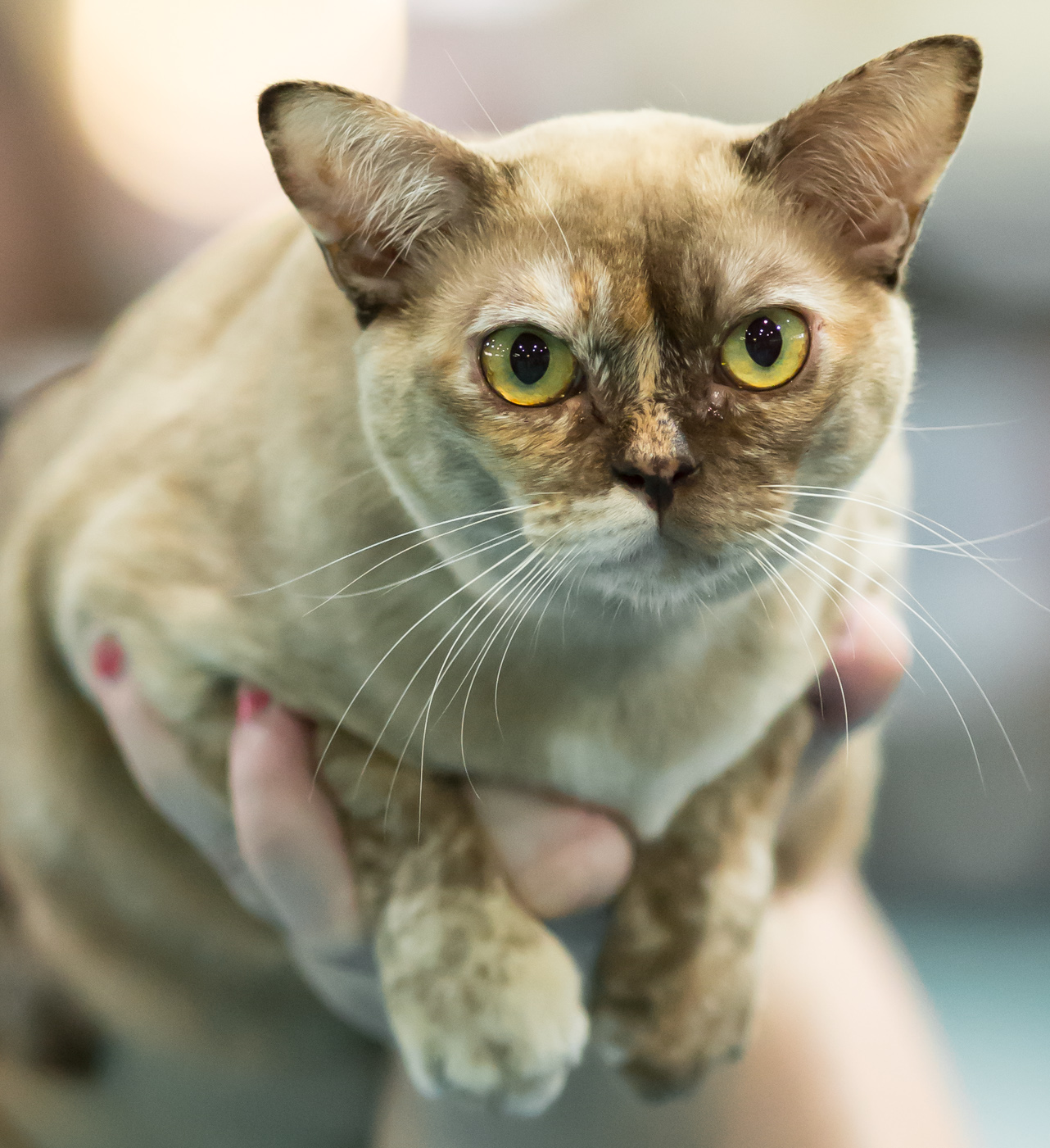
Chocolate tortoiseshell American adult

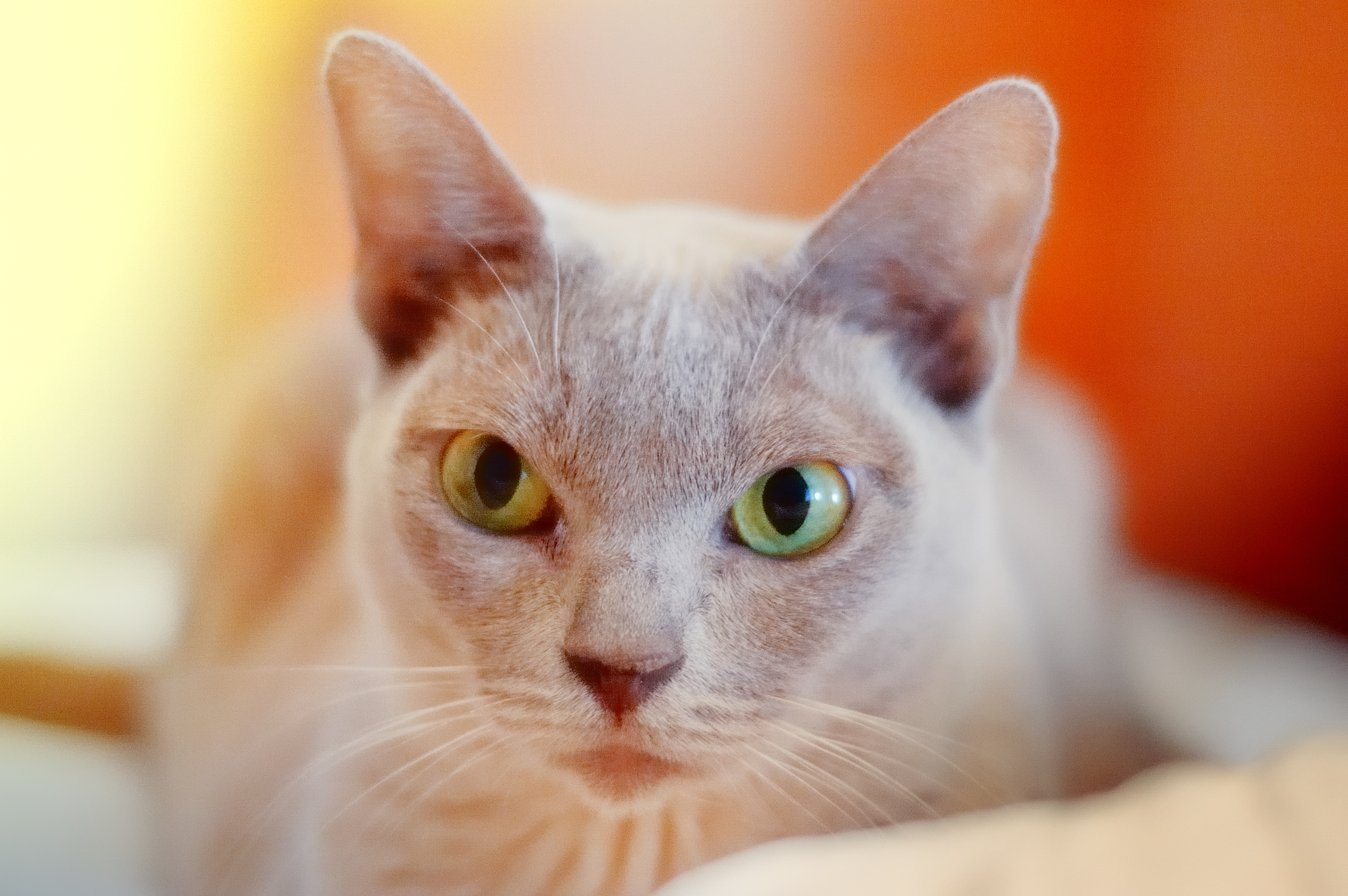
Lilac European adult

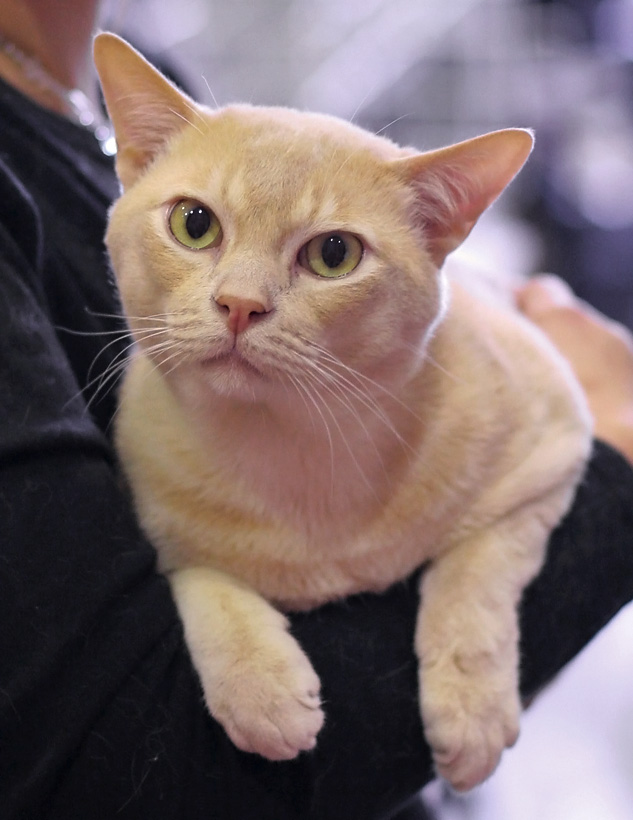
Cream European adult

== Genetics ==
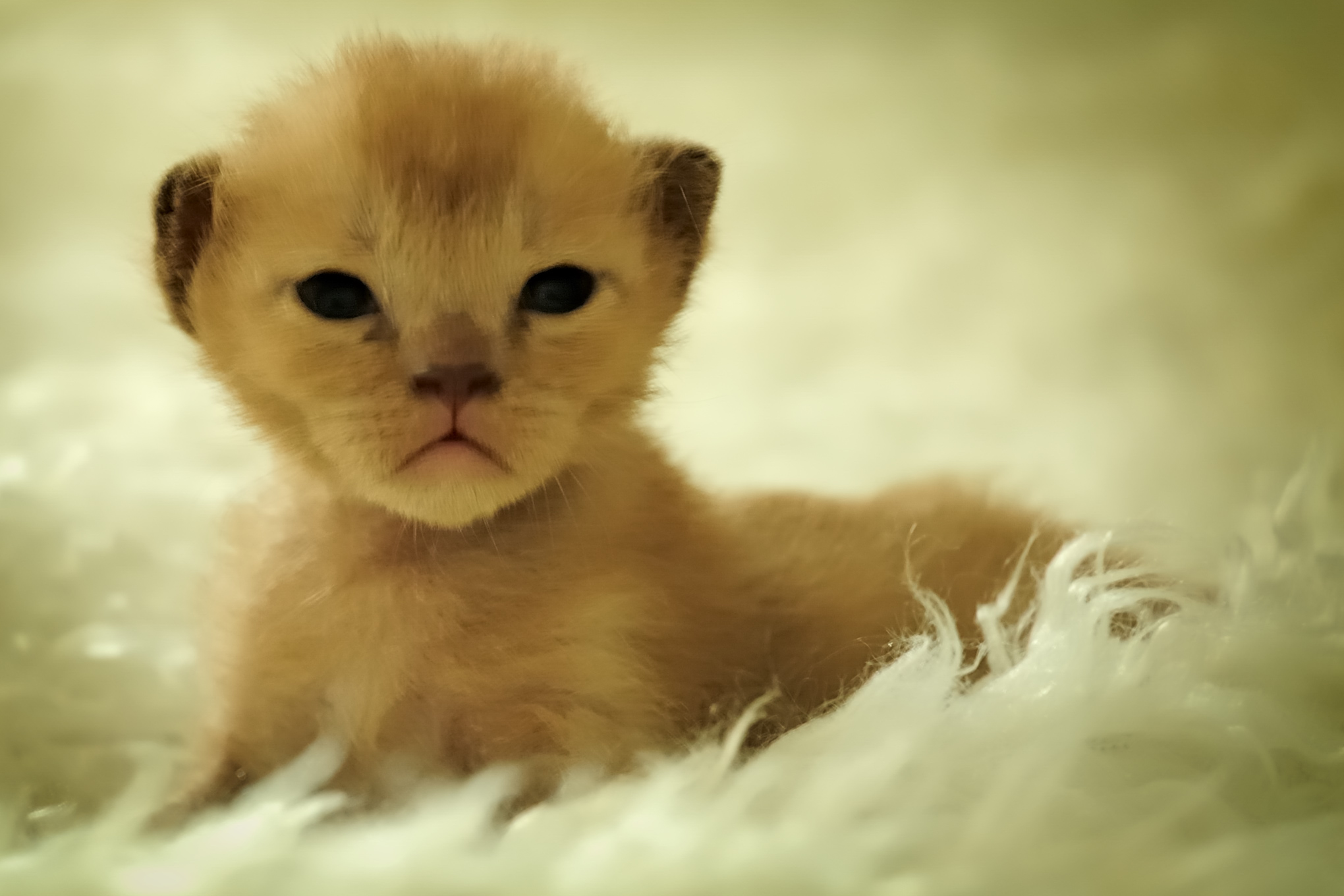
Brown European kitten. The temperature-sensitive colourpoint restriction gene causes brown kittens to be born with light coats.

Chocolate kitten comparison

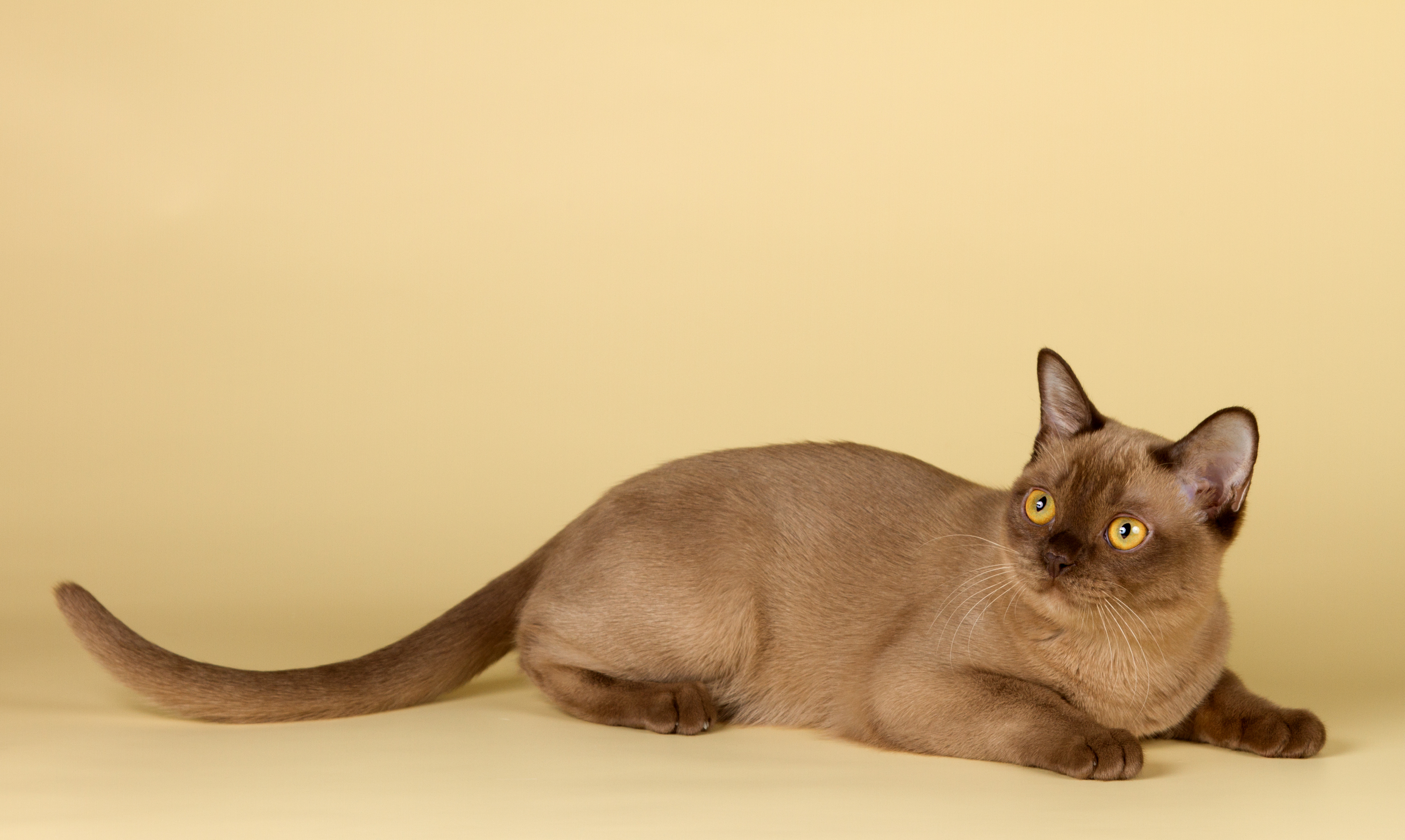
Chocolate American

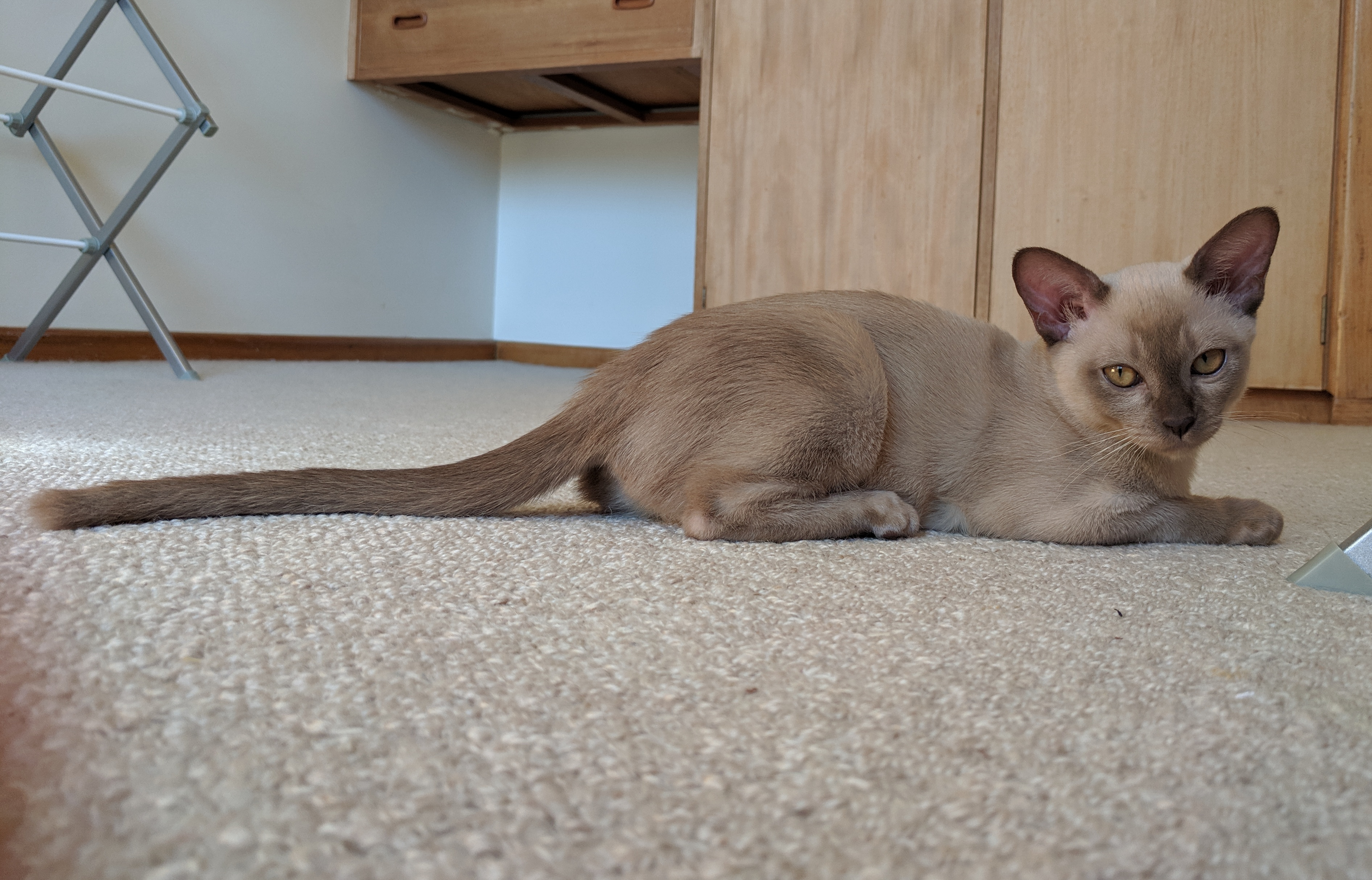
Chocolate European female

The Burmese colourpoint gene (c^{b}c^{b}; referred to as Burmese Colour Restriction or Sepia) is a type of temperature-sensitive acromelanism, part of the albino (c) series. The action of the gene also produces the modified colourpoint effect, which is more noticeable in young kittens due to their higher body temperatures. The Burmese-type sepia (c^{b}) gene can also be combined with the Siamese/Himalayan-type "point" (c^{s}) gene to produce the Tonkinese-type "mink" (c^{b}c^{s}) gene expression, which has a higher contrast between the darker points and the lighter torso, similar to the Burmese chocolate.

The sepia gene is also present in some other cat breeds, particularly the established rex breeds, where it can be fully expressed in its homozygous sepia (c^{b}c^{b}) form. The Asian Group cat breed is related to the Burmese; the Asian is physically similar but comes in different patterns and colours. The Singapura is always homozygous for the sepia gene, combining it with a ticked tabby pattern. Snow Bengals with eye colours other than blue also have the gene.

=== Genetic diversity ===
A 2008 study conducted at UC Davis by the team led by feline geneticist Dr Leslie Lyons found that the American Burmese has the second lowest level of genetic diversity (after the Singapura) of all the breeds studied, and concludes that this situation should be addressed. The CFA observes that "breeders are reporting less hearty litters, smaller adults, smaller litters, and immune system problems, all of which point towards inbreeding depression becoming more common." The Burmese breed council currently allows outcrossing using Bombay, Tonkinese and Burmese type cats imported from Southeast Asia to improve genetic diversity. The Fédération Internationale Féline (FIFe) excludes novice show cats from breeding.

== Health ==
A 2016 study in England of veterinary records found the Burmese to have a higher prevalence of diabetes mellitus compared to other breeds with 2.27% of Burmese having the condition compared to the overall rate of 0.58%. An Australian study in 2009 found a prevalence of 22.1% compared to an overall rate of 7.4%.

A study of veterinary records in the UK found an average life expectancy of 14.42 years for the Burmese with a sample size of 45, the highest in the study and higher than the overall of 11.74 years.

The lineage of American Burmese cats, also known as "contemporary" Burmese, often hosts a 4-aminoacid deletion on the ALX1 gene. Heterozygosity of the mutation results in brachycephaly, while homozygosity results in a profound head malformation known as the Burmese head defect, which is always fatal.

The Burmese is the most commonly affected breed for feline orofacial pain syndrome (FOPS). Certain UK bloodlines suffer from this acute teething disorder in young kittens, where the eruption of the second teeth causes extreme discomfort and the young cat tears at its face to try to alleviate the pain. Eruption of the new teeth in the jaw that causes the problem; these cannot be removed until they have erupted, by which time the problem ceases. Pain relief intervention should be considered, to prevent overt self-trauma. Apart from scarring caused by the self-mutilation, the cat seems to recover completely.

The Burmese is predisposed to congenital hypotrichosis.

The Burmese is one of the more commonly affected breeds for gangliosidosis 2. An autosomal recessive mutation of the HEXB gene is responsible for the condition in the breed.

The Burmese is the cat breed most often affected by hypokalaemia. An autosomal recessive mutation of the WNK4 gene is responsible for congenital forms of hypokalaemia in the breed.

== See also ==
- List of cat breeds
- Tonkinese cat, a domestic cat breed produced by crossbreeding between Siamese and Burmese cats.
- Puppy cat
