= MYBPC =

MYBPC is a gene family that includes the following genes:

- MYBPC1
- MYBPC2
- MYBPC3
