= Maine Coon =

Breed of cat

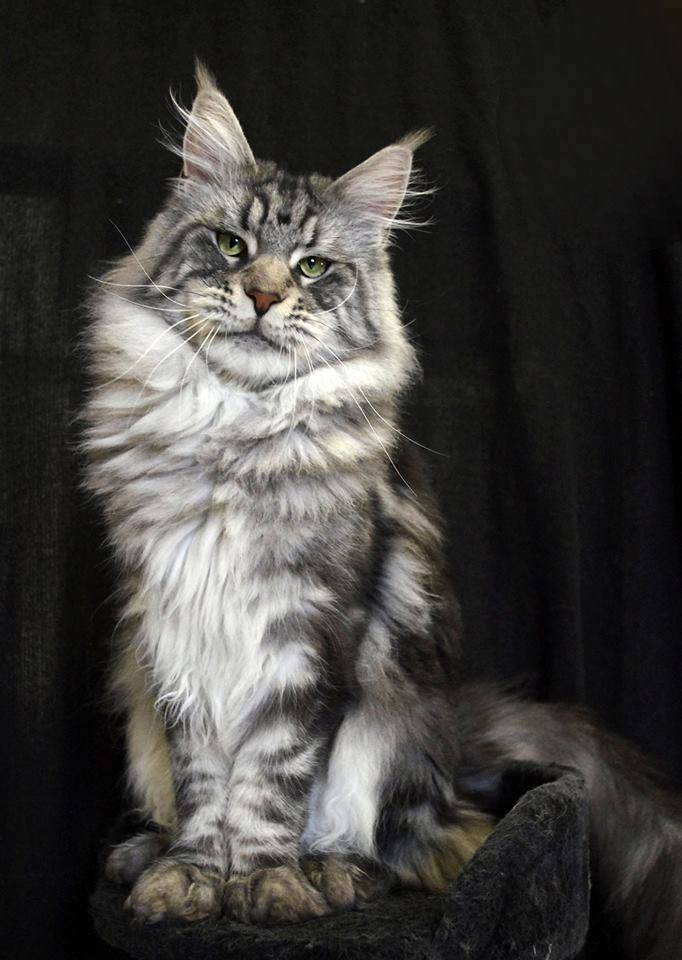
- A black classic tabby male
- Other names: Coon Cat; Maine Cat; Maine Shag; American Longhair; American Coon Cat; American Forest Cat
- Common nicknames: Gentle giants
- Origin: United States

Breed standards
- CFA: standard
- FIFe: standard
- TICA: standard
- ACF: standard
- ACFA/CAA: standard
- CCA-AFC: standard
- GCCF: standard

The Maine Coon is a large domesticated cat breed. The breed is selectively bred from one of the oldest landraces in North America, and is pedigreed in all major cat registries worldwide. It originated in the U.S. state of Maine, where it is the official state cat. The Maine Coon is a large and social cat, commonly referred to as "the gentle giant". The breed is predominantly known for its large size and its long and dense coat of fur which helps it survive in the harsh climate of Maine. The Maine Coon is often cited as having "dog-like" characteristics.

The breed was popular in cat shows in the late 19th century, but its existence became threatened when long-haired breeds from overseas were introduced in the early 20th century. The Maine Coon has since made a comeback, and is the most popular cat breed in multiple global cat registries.

== History ==
=== Origin ===
==== Myths ====
Maine Coon cats are known to have originated in Maine. However, their lineage is surrounded by mystery, folk tales, and myths. One myth claims that the Maine Coon cat is a hybrid with another animal species, such as the raccoon or bobcat. Another myth suggests that the cats are descendants of Viking ship's cats, known today as the Norwegian Forest cats. A third story involves Marie Antoinette, the Queen of France who was executed in 1793. According to this tale, before her death, Antoinette attempted to escape from France with the help of Captain Samuel Clough, loading his ship with her most prized possessions, including six of her favorite Turkish Angora or possibly Siberian cats. Although she did not reach the United States, her pets supposedly arrived safely at Wiscasset, Maine, where they bred with other short-haired cats and contributed to the development of the modern Maine Coon breed.

==== Science ====
These myths and theories have long speculated that the long-haired Maine Coon cat has to be related to other long-haired breeds, due to their similarities in phenotype. This is true for the Maine Coon in particular, that it is descended from the Siberian or Norwegian Forest Cat, brought to New England by settlers or Vikings. Phylogenetic studies showed that the Maine Coon belongs to the Western European monophyletic cat branch, but forms the closest relationship with the random-bred cat population in the Northeastern US (New York region). This Western European branch contains the Siberian and Norwegian Forest cat, but they fall under a different sub-branch.

Maine Coons are descendants of cats brought to New England, US, by Puritan settlers from the UK in the 1600–1700s, and out of the European cats they are genetically closest to cats found in the United Kingdom. It is not relatedness that makes them look similar to the Siberian and Norwegian Forest cats, but convergent evolution. These breeds all formed in harsh climates, in which natural selection pressures for similar qualities. Thick, long coats, toe and ear tufts, big bodies, and snowshoe-like big feet are useful traits in all the harsh climates where these breeds originate. Since the 19th century, Maine Coons have been selectively bred for larger size, meaning modern Maine Coons are larger than they would be under natural selection alone.

=== Early cat shows and decline ===
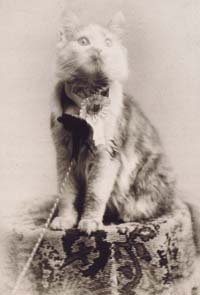
"Cosey," winner of the first U.S. cat show, 1895

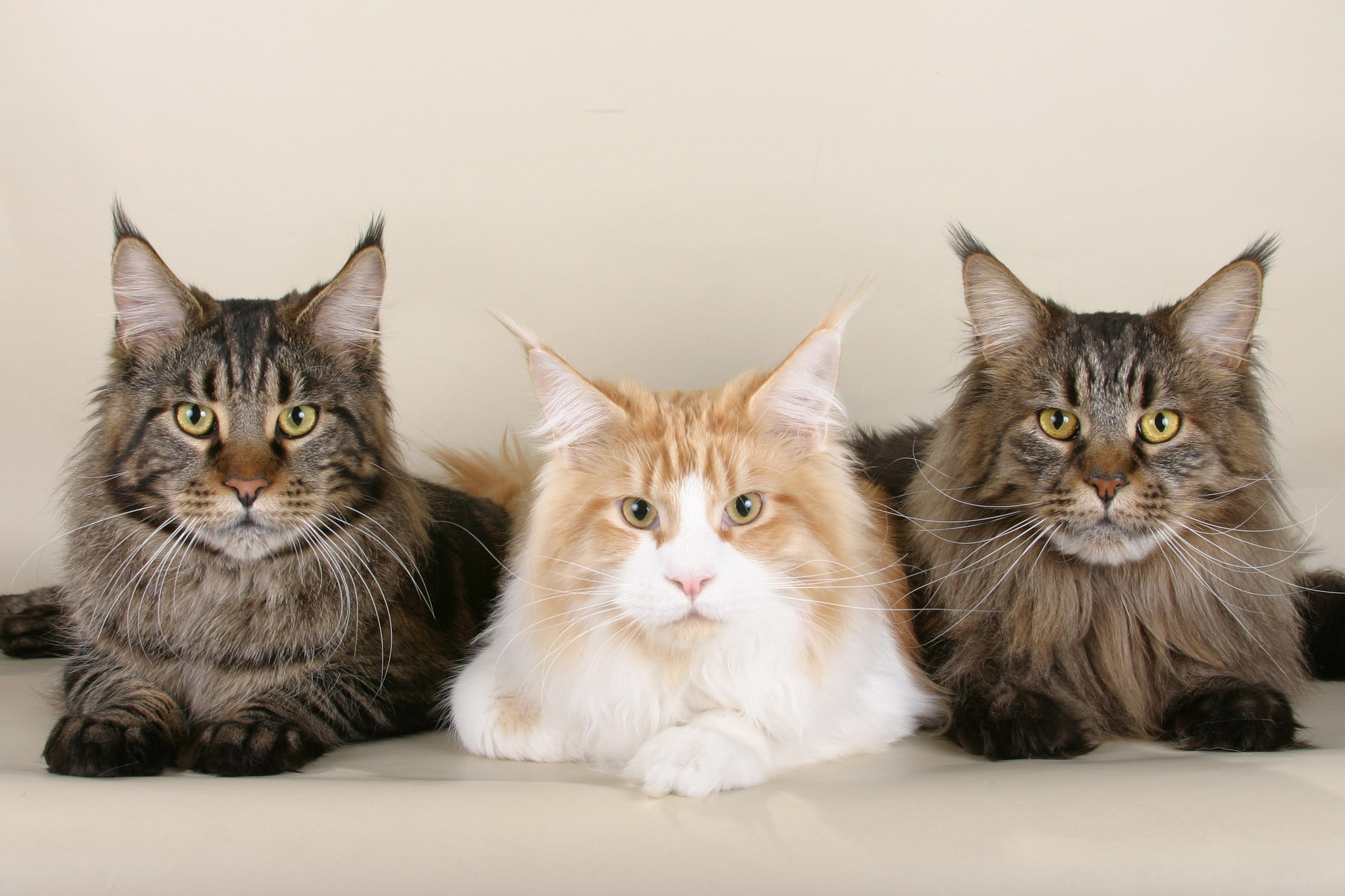
Three adult Maine Coons

The first mention of Maine Coon cats in a literary work was in 1861 in Frances Simpson's The Book of the Cat (1903). F.R. Pierce, who owned several Maine Coons, wrote a chapter about the breed. During the late 1860s, farmers located in Maine told stories about their cats and held the "Maine State Champion Coon Cat" contest at the local Skowhegan Fair.

In 1895, a dozen Maine Coons were entered into a US cat show in Boston. On 8 May 1895, the first North American cat show was hosted at Madison Square Garden in New York City. A female Maine Coon brown tabby named "Cosey" was entered into the show. Owned by Mrs. Fred Brown, Cosey won the silver collar and medal and was named "Best in Show". The silver collar was purchased by the CFA Foundation with the help of a donation from the National Capital Cat Show. The collar is housed at the CFA Central Office in the Jean Baker Rose Memorial Library.

In the early 20th century, the Maine Coon's popularity began to decline with the introduction of other long-haired breeds, such as the Persian, which originated in the Middle East. The last recorded win by a Maine Coon in a US national cat show for over 40 years was in 1911 at a show in Portland, Oregon. The breed was rarely seen after that. The decline was so severe that the breed was declared extinct in the 1950s, although this declaration was considered to be exaggerated and reported prematurely at the time.

== Breed registration ==
The Central Maine Cat Club (CMCC) was created in the early 1950s in the US by Ethylin Whittemore, Alta Smith, and Ruby Dyer in an attempt to increase the popularity of the Maine Coon. For 11 years, the CMCC held cat shows and hosted exhibitions of photographs of the breed and is noted for creating the first written breed standards for the Maine Coon.

The Maine Coon was denied provisional breed status—one of the three steps required for a breed not yet recognized by the CFA to be able to compete in championship competitions—by the CFA three times, which led to the formation of the Maine Coon Cat Club in 1973. The breed was accepted by the CFA under provisional status in May 1975, and was approved for championship status in May 1976. The next couple of decades saw a rise in the popularity of the Maine Coon, with championship victories and an increase in national rankings. In 1985, the US state of Maine announced that the breed would be named the official state cat.

=== Popularity ===
In the 2024 statistics of FIFe, one of the major global cat registries, the Maine Coon ranked first place as the most popular cat breed, comprising 24.7% of their total registered kittens that year, which translates to 23,775 cats. In 2025 the Maine Coon overtook the Ragdoll, becoming the most registered cat breed with the CFA.

== Characteristics ==
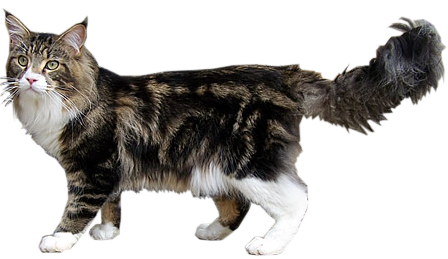
A brown classic tabby and white

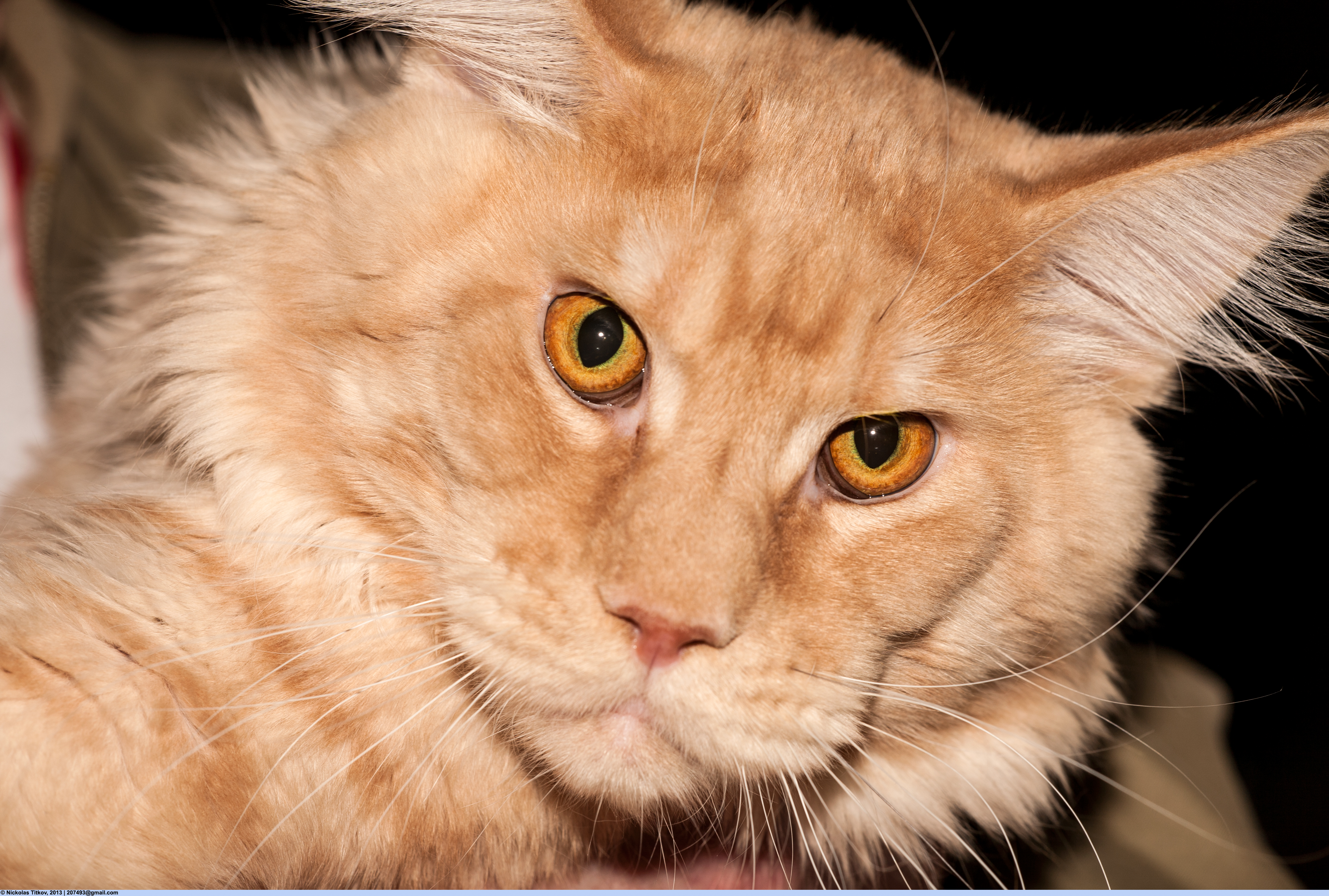
A red tabby, showing the typical head shape

=== Fur coat ===
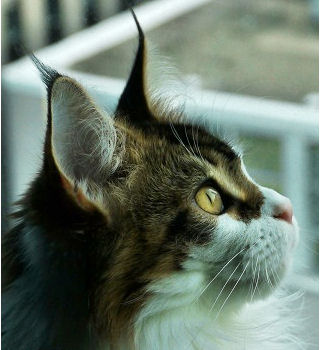
Face profile with typical lynx-like ear tips

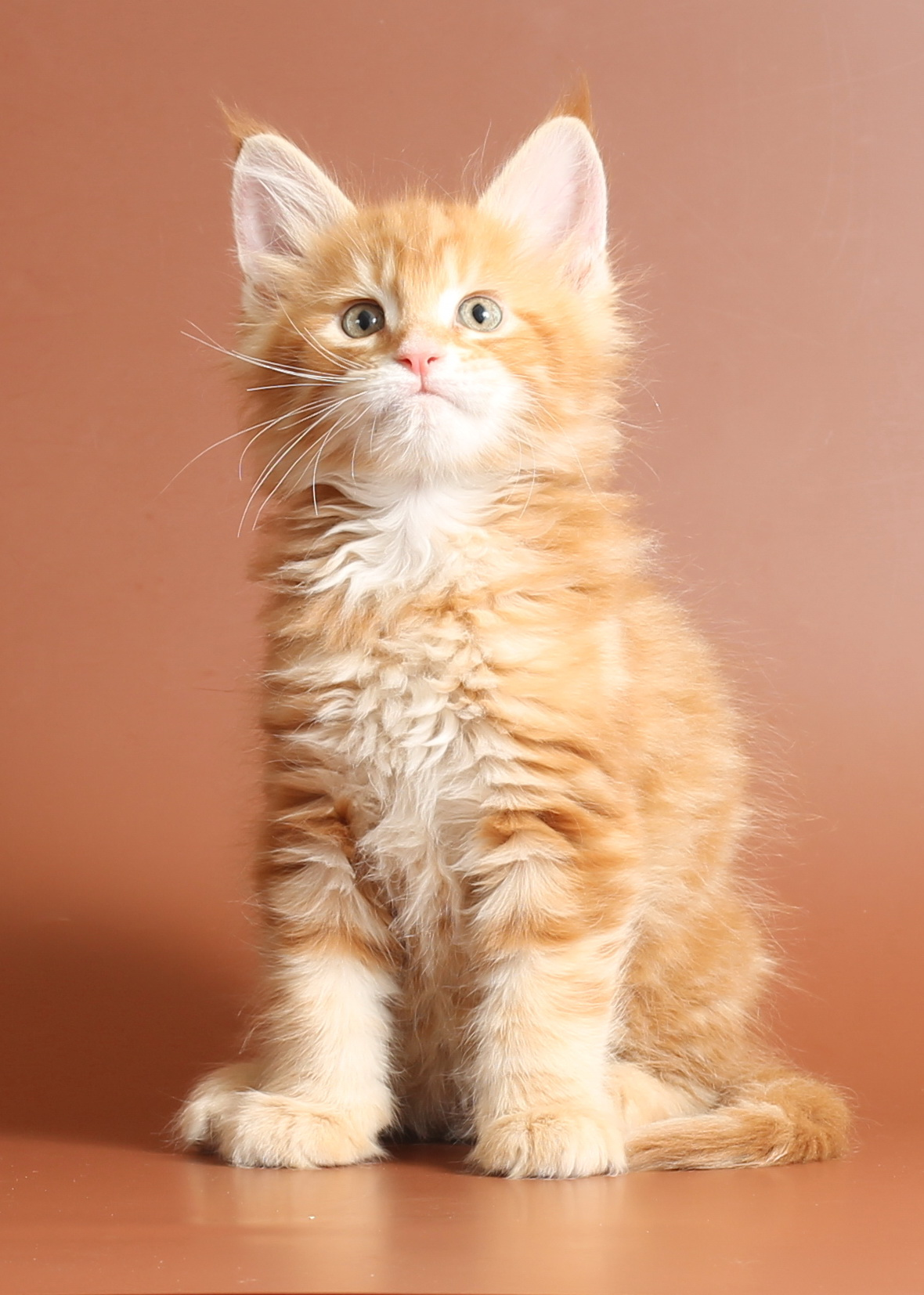
A red tabby kitten with large paws

The Maine Coon is a long- or medium-haired cat. The coat is soft and silky, although texture may vary with coat color. The length is shorter on the head and shoulders and longer on the stomach and flanks, with some cats having a leonine ruff around their neck. Minimal grooming is required for the breed compared to other long-haired breeds, as their double coat is mostly self-maintaining owing to a light-density undercoat. The coat is subject to seasonal variation, with the fur being thicker in the winter and thinner during the summer.

Maine Coons have several physical adaptations for survival in harsh winter climates. Their dense water-resistant fur is longer and shaggier on their underside and rear for extra protection when they are walking or sitting on top of wet surfaces of snow or ice. Their long and bushy raccoon-like tail is resistant to sinking in snow, and can be curled around their face and shoulders for warmth and protection from wind and blowing snow. It can even be curled around their backside like an insulated seat cushion when sitting down on a frozen surface.

Large paws facilitate walking on snow and are often compared to snowshoes. Long tufts of fur growing between their toes help keep the toes warm and further aid walking on snow by giving the paws additional structure without significant extra weight. Heavily furred ears with extra long tufts of fur growing from inside can keep warm more easily.

=== Coat colors ===
Maine Coons can have any colors that other cats have. Colors indicating crossbreeding, such as chocolate, lilac, colourpoint patterns or the "ticked" tabby patterns, are not accepted by some breed standards. This is not universal; the ticked pattern, for example, is accepted by TICA and CFA. The most common pattern seen in the breed is brown tabby. All eye colors are accepted under breed standards, with the exception of blue or odd-eyes, i.e. heterochromia iridium (two eyes of different colors), in cats possessing coat colors other than white.

=== Size ===
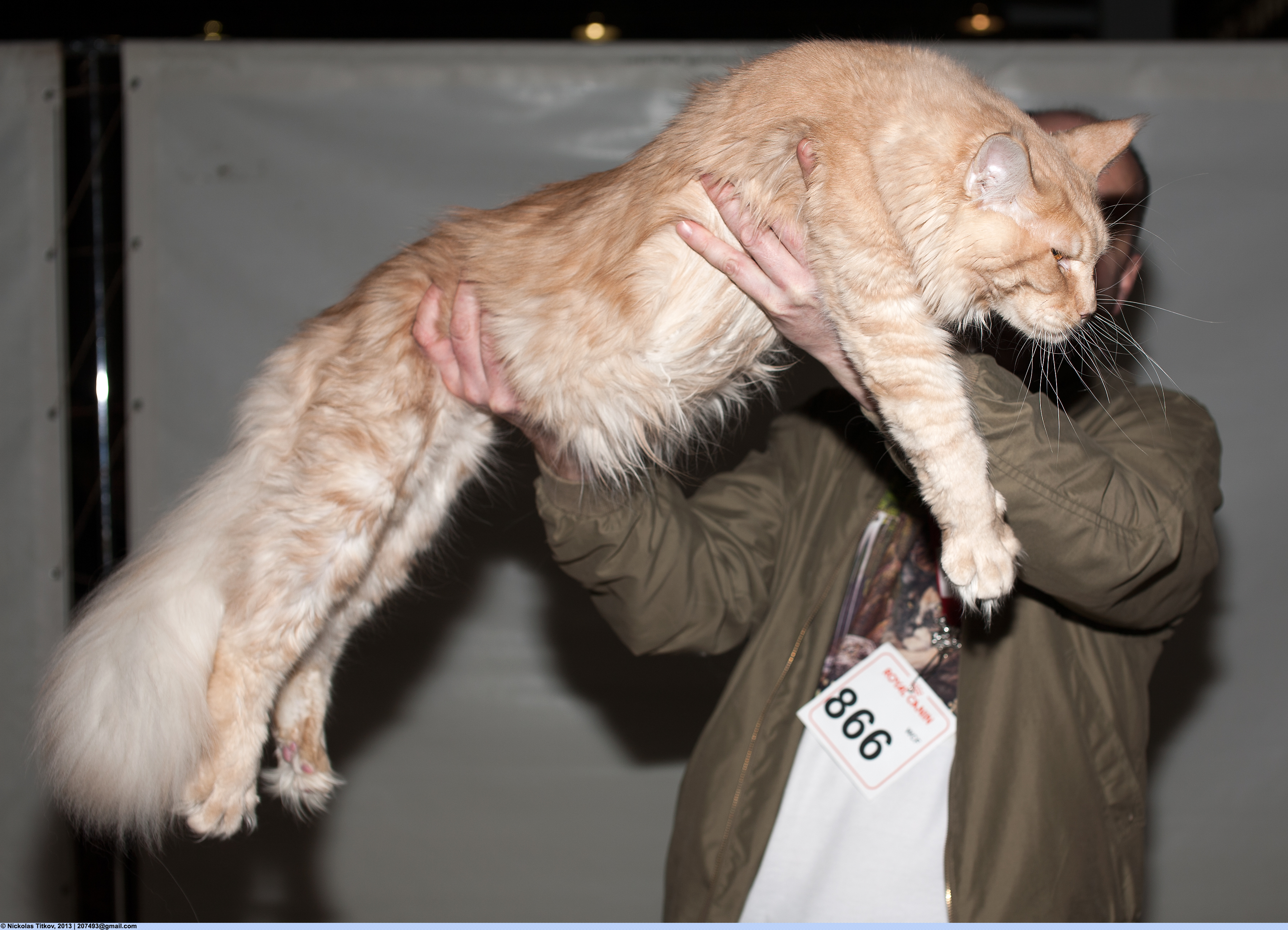
11-month-old cream tabby male kitten being held at cat show

The Maine Coon is one of the largest breed of domesticated cats. It was the largest breed until the introduction of the hybrid Savannah cat (crossing a serval (Leptailurus serval) with a domestic cat) in the mid-1980s. It is still the largest non-hybrid breed. On average, males weigh from 8 to 10 kg (18 to 22 lb), with females weighing from 5 to 7 kg (12 to 15 lb). The height of adults can vary between 25 and 41 cm (10 and 16 in) and they can reach a length of up to 97 cm (38 in), including the tail, which can reach a length of 36 cm (14 in) and is long, tapering, and heavily furred, almost resembling a raccoon's tail. The body is solid and muscular, which is necessary for supporting their weight, and the chest is broad. Maine Coons possess a rectangular body shape and are slow to physically mature; their full size is normally not reached until they are three to five years old, while other cats take about one year.

In 2010, the Guinness World Records accepted a male purebred Maine Coon named "Stewie" as the "Longest Cat", measuring 123 cm (48.5 in) from the tip of his nose to the tip of his tail. Stewie died on 4 February 2013 from cancer at his home in Reno, Nevada, US, at age 8. Large Maine Coons can overlap in length with Eurasian lynxes, although with a much lighter build and lower height.

== Health ==
=== Polydactylism ===
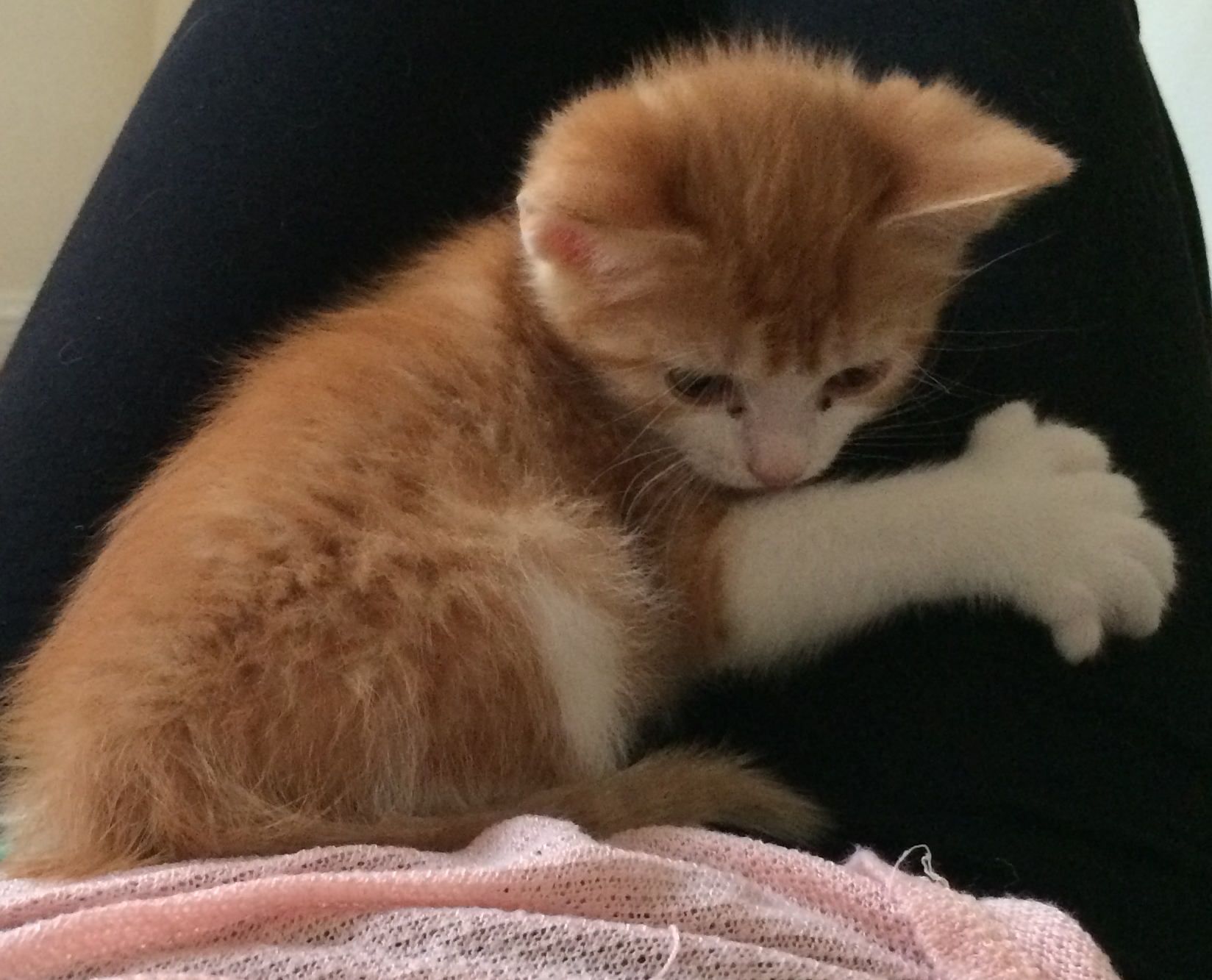
A polydactyl kitten

Many of the original Maine Coon cats that inhabited the US New England area possessed a trait known as polydactylism (having one or more extra toes on a paw). With the 1970s revival of the interest in the breed, Maine Coon cats were noted to show an increased incidence of polydactylism compared to other breeds. Subsequently, breeders of show-standard cats were advised to regard this variation as undesirable and to offer affected kittens as household pets. The trait later became separately certified by some organizations, like TICA. Meanwhile, in increasing numbers of cat fancy competitions, the trait is no longer marked down.

Polydactylism is rarely, if ever, seen in Maine Coons in the show ring, since it is not allowed by competition standards. The gene for polydactylism is a simple autosomal dominant gene. The genetic mutations which cause polydactylism in Maine Coons do not appear to cause other health problems. Polydactyly in Maine Coon cats is characterised by broad phenotypic diversity. Polydactyly not only affects digit number and conformation, but also carpus and tarsus conformation. The trait was almost eradicated from the breed due to the fact that it was an automatic disqualifier in show rings. Some private organizations and breeders were created in order to preserve polydactylism in Maine Coon cats.

=== Life expectancy ===
Pet insurance data obtained from a study during years 2003–2006 in Sweden puts the median lifespan of the Maine Coon at > 12.5 years. 74% lived to 10 years or more and 54% lived to 12.5 years or more. A UK study found a life expectancy of 9.71 years for Maine Coons, compared to 11.74 years for all cats.

=== Heart ===
Hypertrophic cardiomyopathy (HCM) has been observed in Maine Coon populations. A mutation in the MYBPC3 gene found in Maine Coons has been associated with HCM.

Of all the Maine Coons tested for the MyBPC mutation at the Veterinary Cardiac Genetics Lab at the College of Veterinary Medicine at Washington State University, approximately one-third tested positive. Not all cats that test positive will have clinical signs of the disease, and some Maine Coon cats with clinical evidence of hypertrophic cardiomyopathy test negative for this mutation, strongly suggesting that a second mutation exists in the breed. The HCM prevalence was found to be 10.1% (95% CI 5.8-14.3%) in this study. Early growth and nutrition, larger body size, and obesity may be environmental modifiers of genetic predisposition to HCM.

=== Kidney ===
Polycystic kidney disease (PKD) is an inherited condition in cats that causes multiple cysts (pockets of fluid) to form in the kidneys. These cysts are present from birth. Initially, they are very small, but they grow larger over time and may eventually disrupt kidney function, resulting in kidney failure. While renal cysts are observed with a low incidence in Maine Coons, PKD appears to be a misnomer in this particular breed. In a 2013 study, spanning 8 years, renal cysts were documented by ultrasound in 7 of 187 healthy Maine Coons enrolled in a pre-breeding screening programme. The cysts were mostly single and unilateral (6/7, 85.7%), small (mean 3.6 mm in diameter), and located at the corticomedullary junction (4/6, 66.7%), thus, different in size, number, and location from those observed in Persian-related breeds. In the same study, all six Maine Coon cats with renal cysts tested negative for the PKD1 mutation, proving the disease in these cats to be unrelated to the PKD observed in Persians and related breeds. Gene sequencing of these cats failed to demonstrate any common genetic sequences. Gendron et al. found that "Maine Coon PKD" represents a form of juvenile nephropathy other than PKD.

=== Skeletal, joint and muscle ===
Hip dysplasia is an abnormality of the hip joint which can cause crippling lameness and arthritis. The cats most commonly affected with hip dysplasia tend to be males of the larger, big-boned breeds such as Persians and Maine Coons. Smaller and lighter cats frequently experience less severe symptoms. X-rays submitted to the Orthopedic Foundation for Animals (OFA) between 1974 and 2011 indicate that 24.3% of Maine Coons in the database were dysplastic. Dysplasia was more severe in bilateral than unilateral cases and with increasing age.

The Maine Coon is one of the more commonly affected breeds for spinal muscular atrophy. An autosomal recessive mutation in both the LIX1 and LNPEP gene are responsible for the condition in the breed.

=== Other ===
Maine Coons also seem to be predisposed to develop entropion, mainly on the lateral aspect of the eyelids, which can lead to corneal irritation and ulceration, and may require surgery.

== Gallery ==
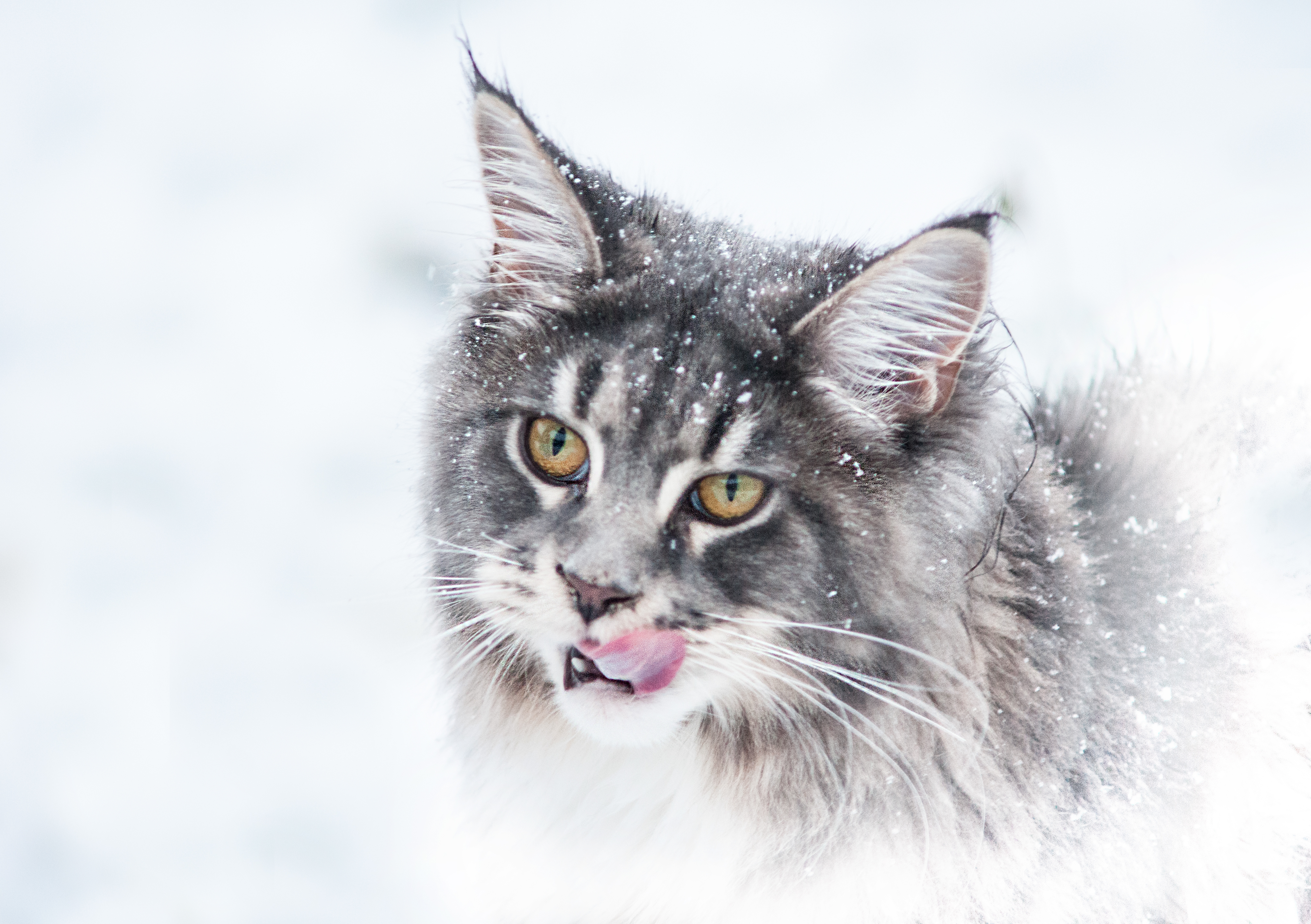
A blue tabby in snow

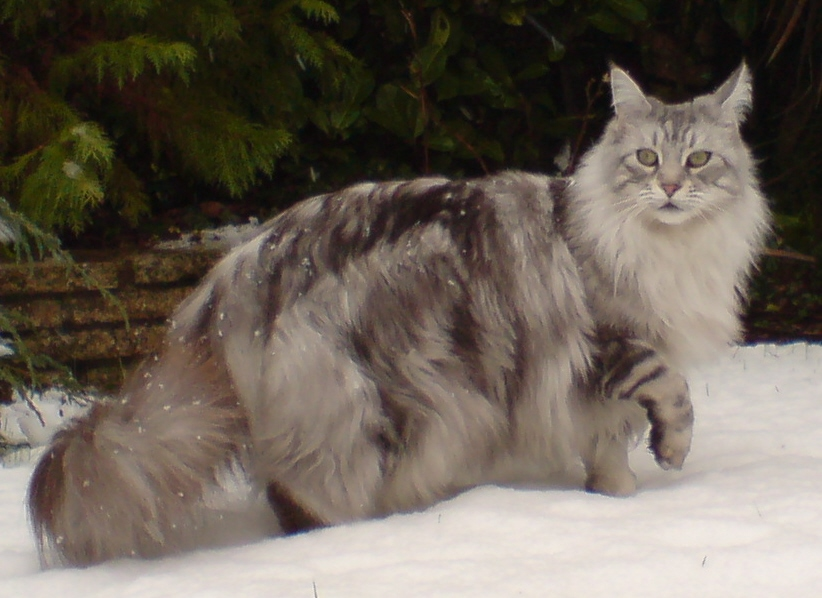
A black silver classic tabby

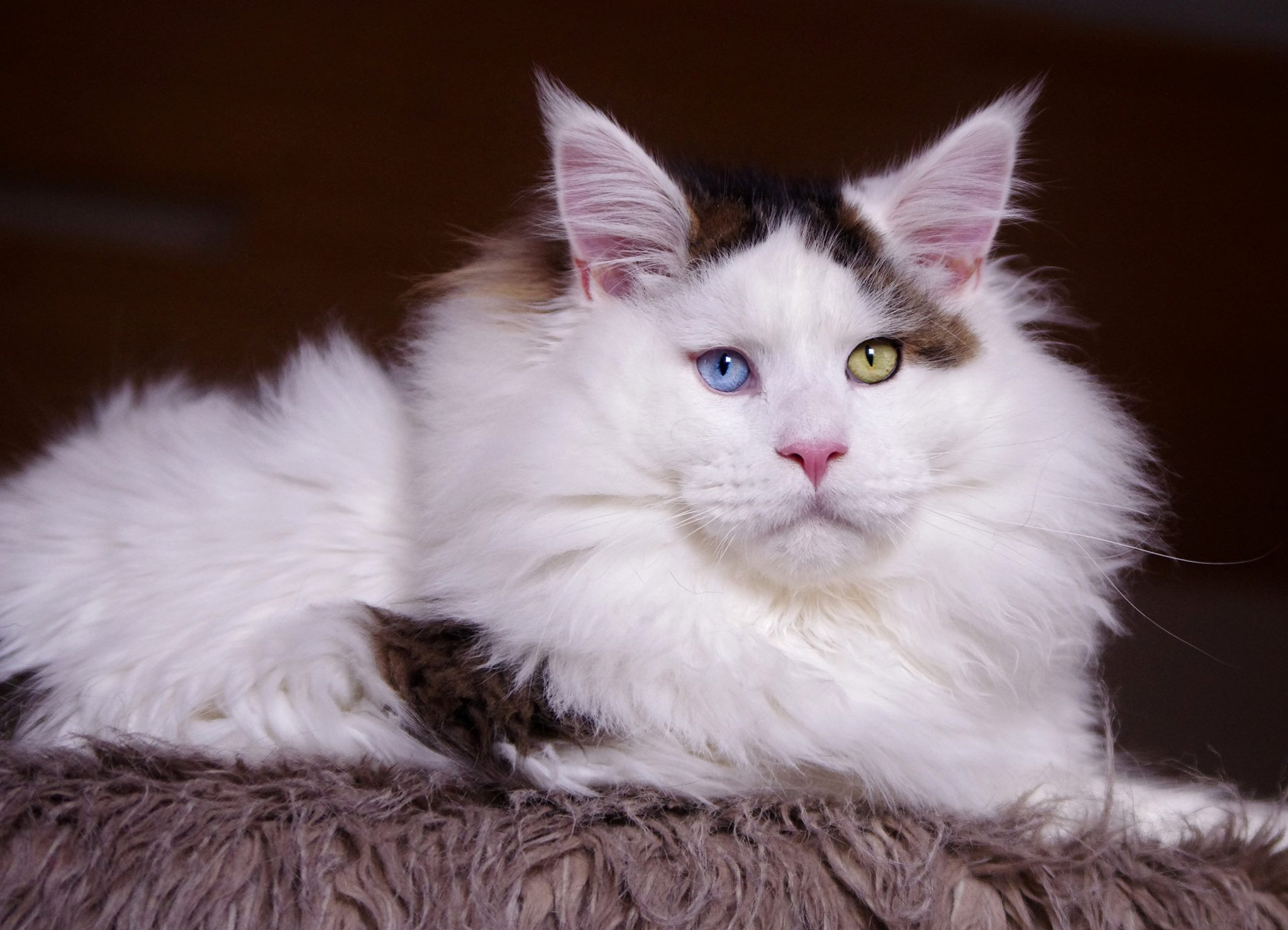
An odd-eyed harlequin patterned black tabby and white male

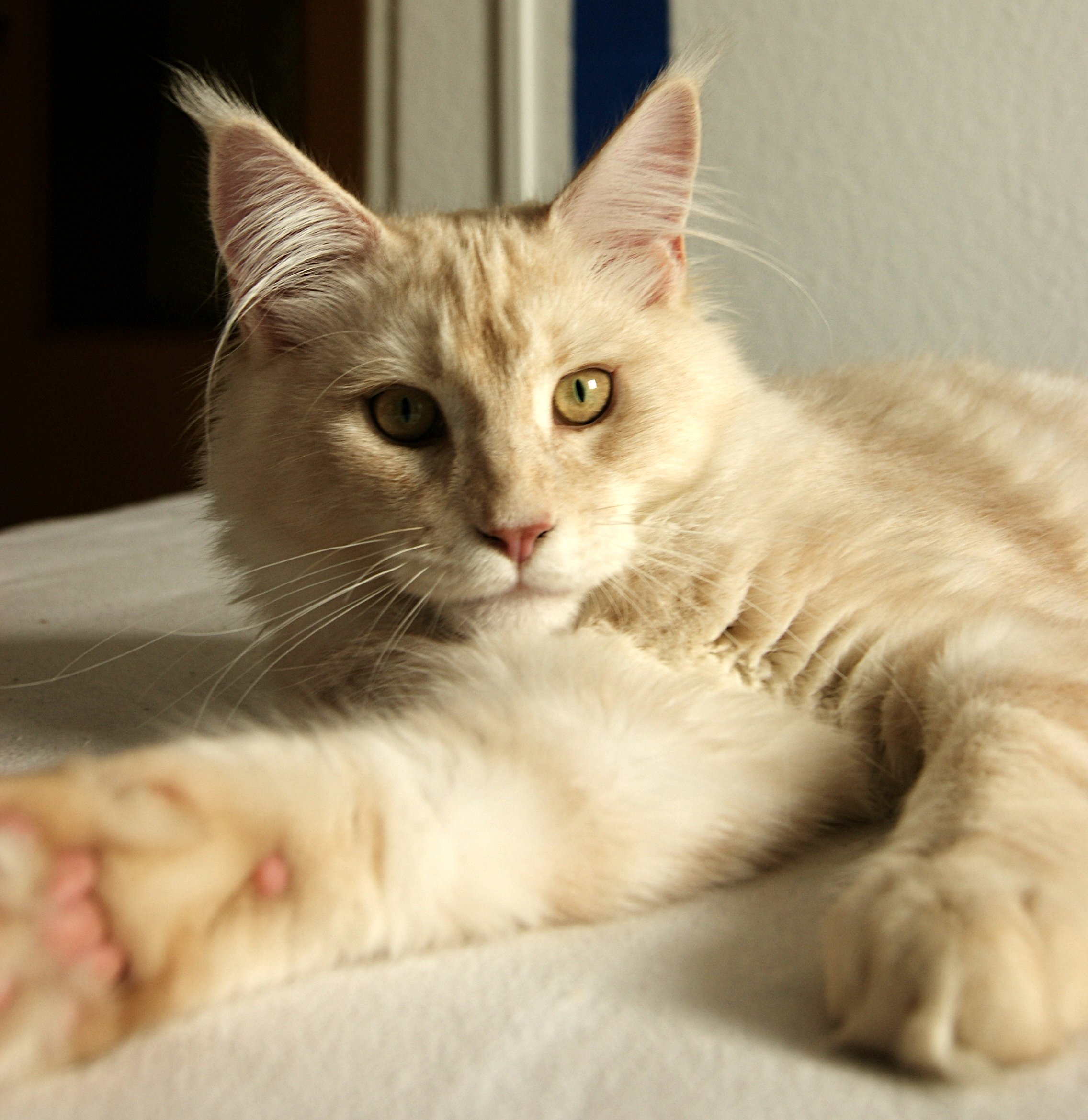
An 8-month-old cream silver tabby

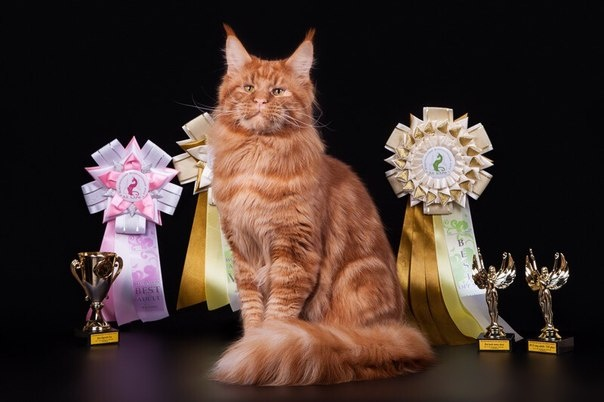
Red blotched tabby champion

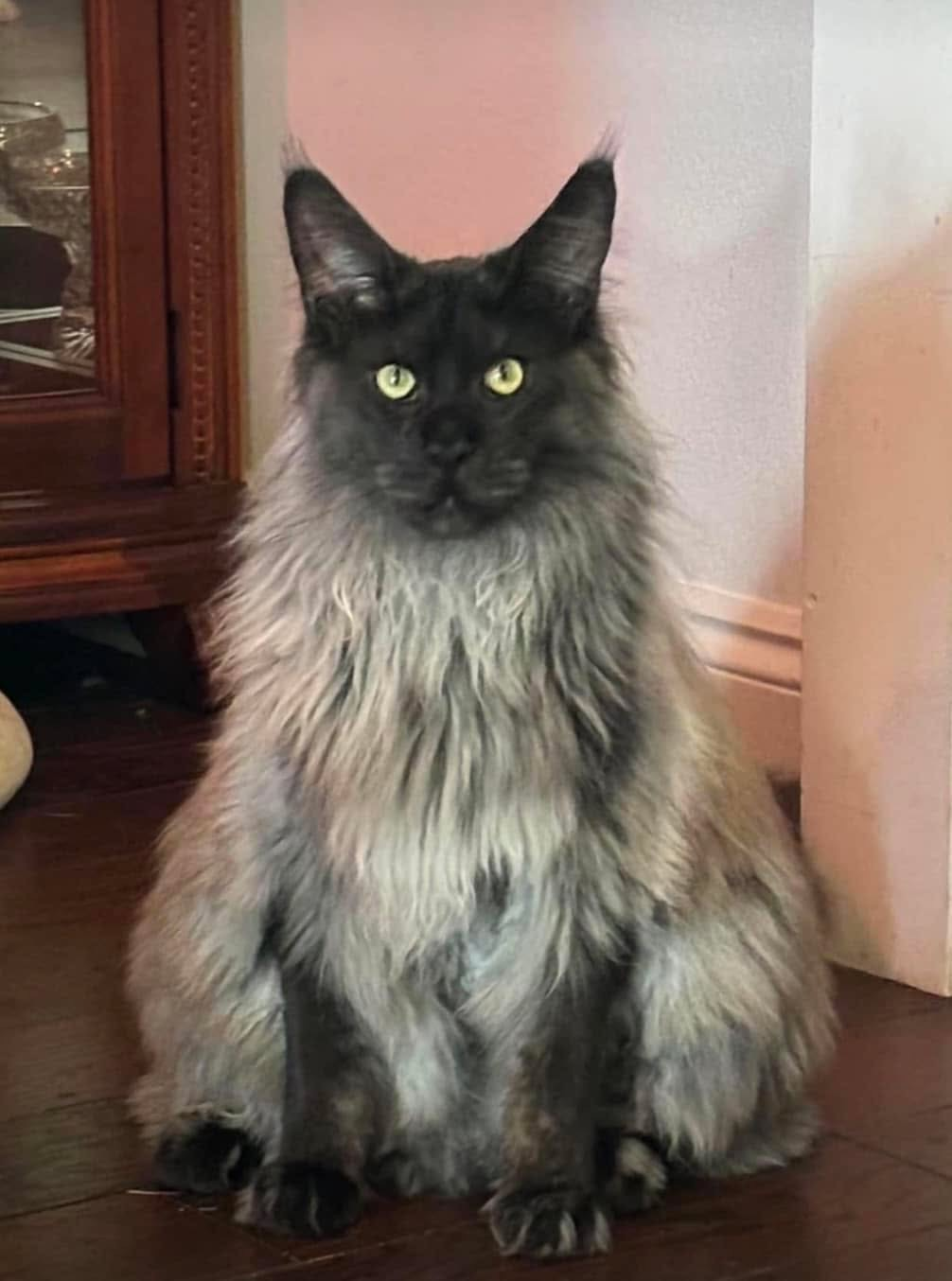
Black Smoke

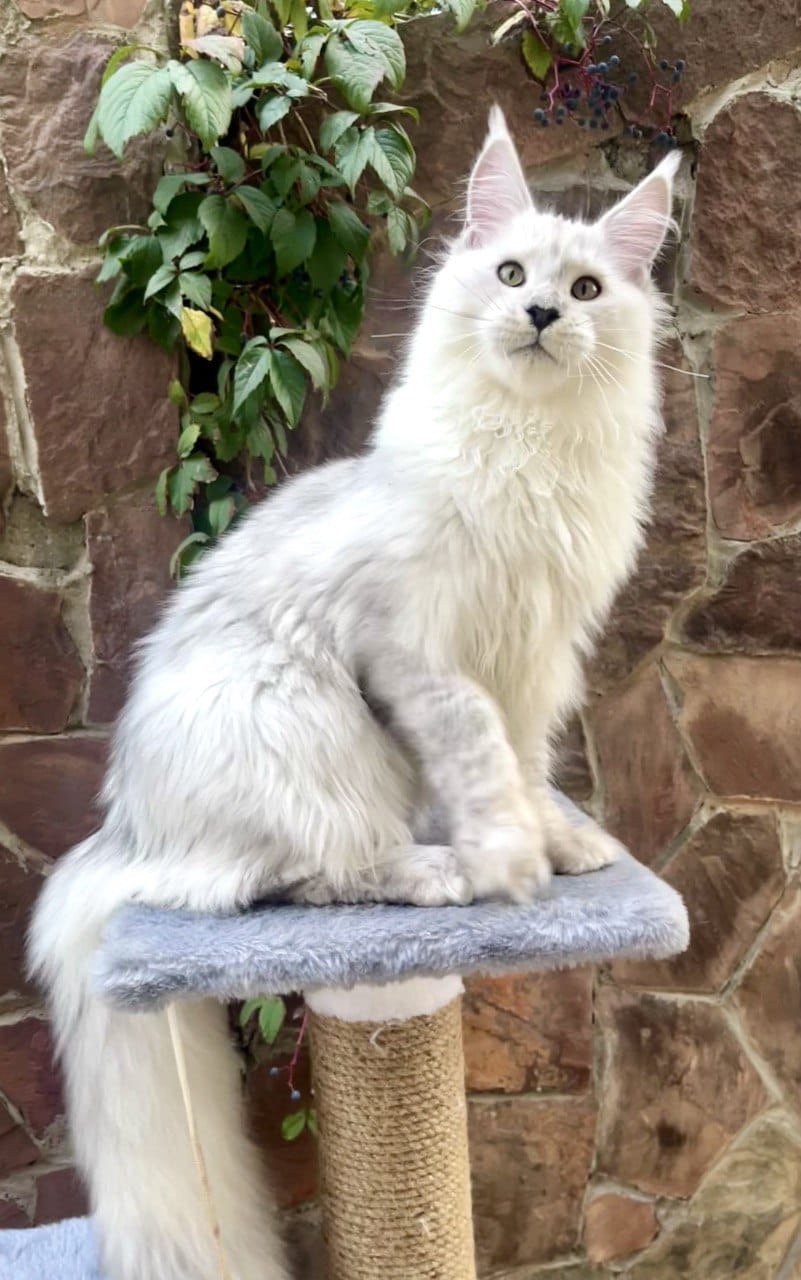
A silver shaded Maine Coon cat

== See also ==
- List of cat breeds
  - Norwegian Forest Cat – Breed of domestic cat
  - Siberian cat – Breed of domestic cat
- Puppy cat – Behavioral pattern found in domestic cats
