= Myosin binding protein C, cardiac =

Protein found in humans

MYBPC3
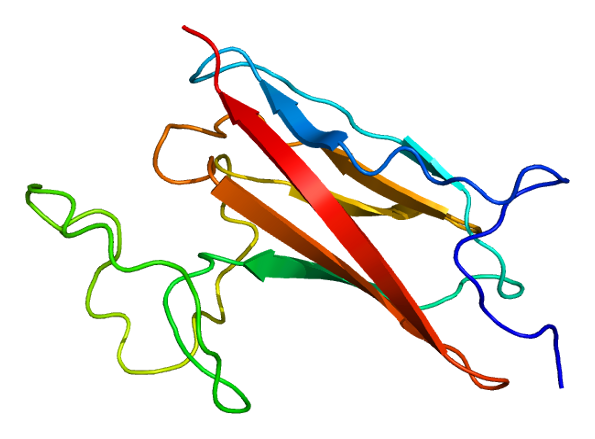

Identifiers
- Aliases: MYBPC3, CMD1MM, CMH4, FHC, LVNC10, MYBP-C, Myosin binding protein C, cardiac, cMyBP-C, myosin binding protein C3
- External IDs: OMIM: 600958; MGI: 102844; GeneCards: MYBPC3
Available structures
PDB	Ortholog search: PDBe RCSB
PDB	List of PDB id codes 1GXE, 2AVG, 2K1M, 2MQ0, 2MQ3, 2V6H, 3CX2, 1PD6

Gene location (Human)
Chr.	Chromosome 11 (human)
Band	11p11.2	Start	47,331,406 bp
Band	11p11.2	End	47,352,702 bp

Gene location (Mouse)
Chr.	Chromosome 2 (mouse)
Band	2|2 E1	Start	90,948,489 bp
Band	2|2 E1	End	90,966,861 bp
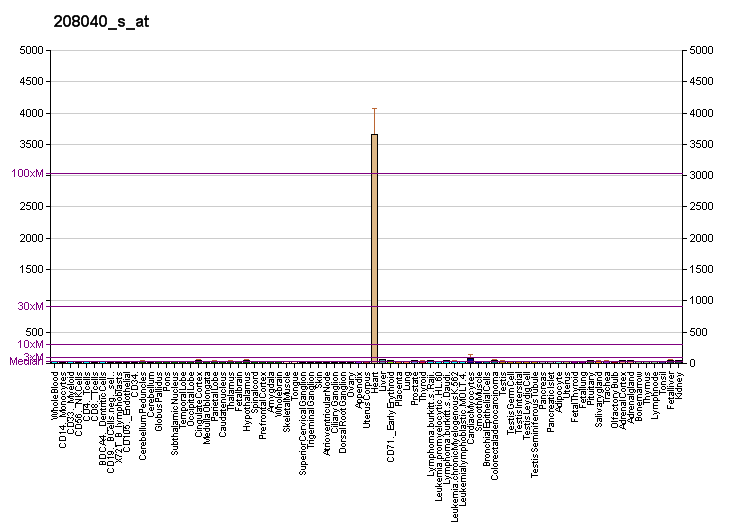
RNA expression pattern
Bgee	Human / Mouse (ortholog); Top expressed in: apex of heart; right auricle of heart; myocardium of left ventricle; right ventricle; cardiac muscle tissue of right atrium; vena cava; testicle; blood; pericardium; gonad / Top expressed in: myocardium of ventricle; cardiac muscles; right ventricle; cardiac muscle tissue of left ventricle; atrium; interventricular septum; endocardial cushion; atrioventricular valve; semi-lunar valve; aortic valve; More reference expression data
BioGPS	More reference expression data
Gene ontology
Molecular function	myosin binding; titin binding; metal ion binding; myosin heavy chain binding; protein binding; identical protein binding; actin binding; ATPase activator activity; structural constituent of muscle; actin filament binding; muscle alpha-actinin binding; structural molecule activity conferring elasticity
Cellular component	cytosol; C zone; sarcomere; striated muscle myosin thick filament; myosin filament; A band; Z discdkac; M band; cardiac myofibril; striated muscle thin filament
Biological process	regulation of muscle filament sliding; positive regulation of ATP-dependent activity; cardiac muscle contraction; heart morphogenesis; ventricular cardiac muscle tissue morphogenesis; regulation of striated muscle contraction; cell adhesion; muscle filament sliding; striated muscle contraction; actin filament organization; sarcomere organization; striated muscle myosin thick filament assembly; muscle contraction; skeletal muscle thin filament assembly; skeletal muscle myosin thick filament assembly; cardiac myofibril assembly; cardiac muscle tissue morphogenesis
Sources:Amigo / QuickGO
Orthologs
Databases	NCBI: entry; OMA: entry
Species	Human	Mouse
Entrez	4607	17868
Ensembl	ENSG00000134571	ENSMUSG00000002100
UniProt	Q14896	O70468
RefSeq (mRNA)	NM_000256	NM_008653
RefSeq (protein)	NP_000247; NP_000247.2	n/a
Location (UCSC)	Chr 11: 47.33 – 47.35 Mb	Chr 2: 90.95 – 90.97 Mb
PubMed search
- Wikidata
View/Edit Human	View/Edit Mouse

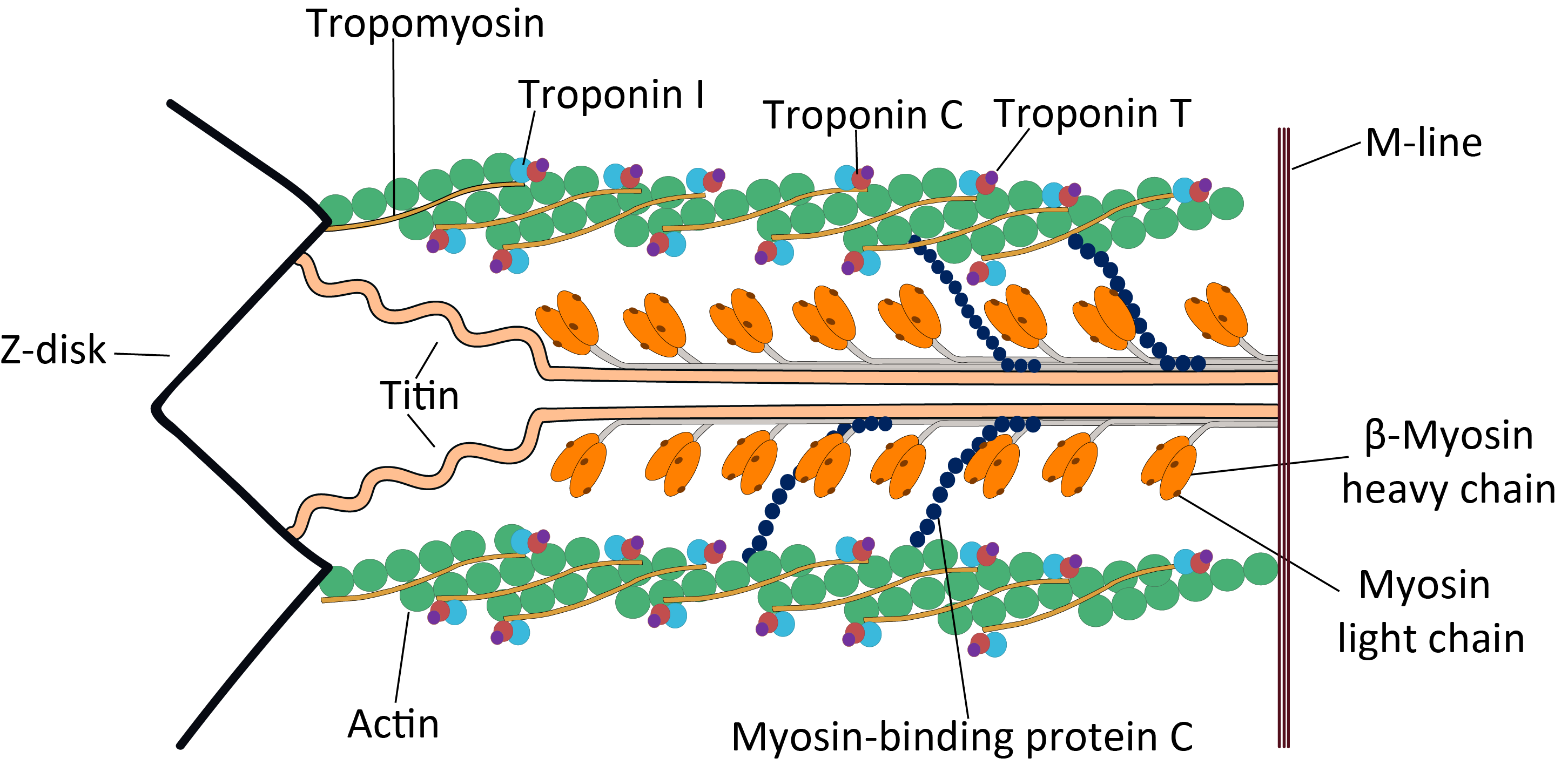
An illustration showing various components of cardiac sarcomere, including myosin-binding protein C

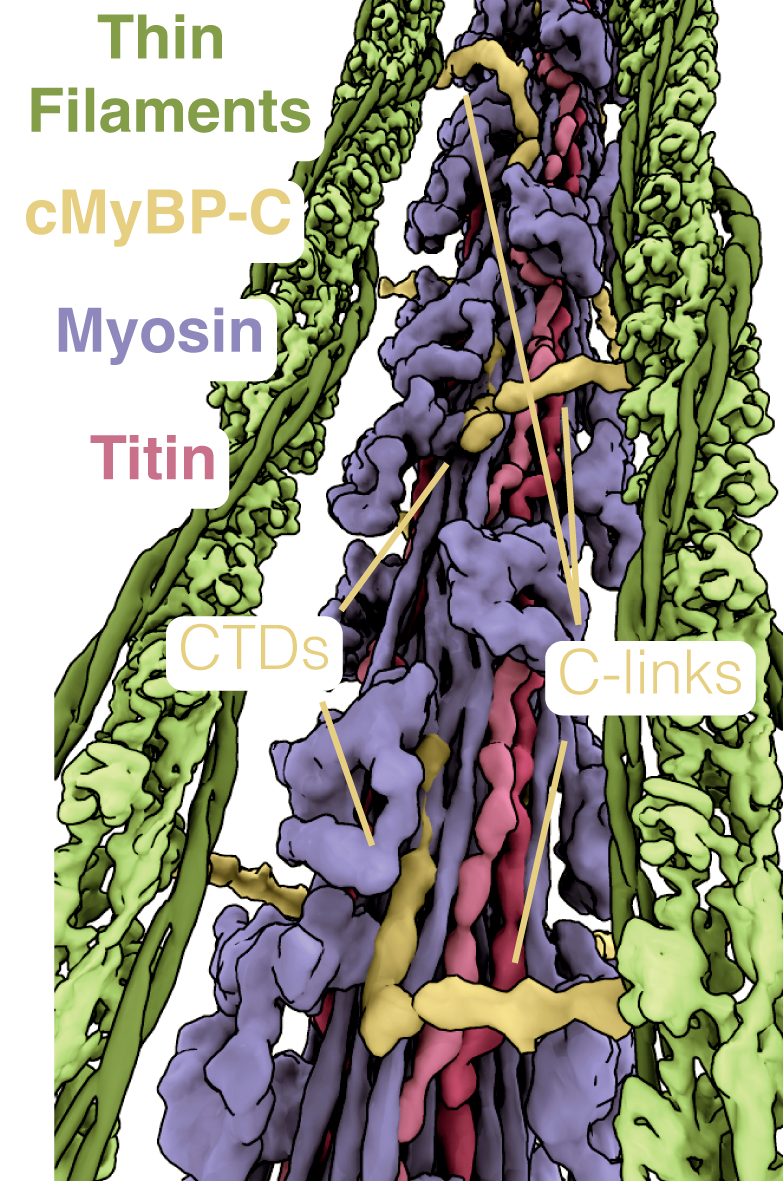
cMYBP-C C-terminal domain (CTD) anchors to the thick filament creating bridges (C-links) towards the thin filaments. Structural data adapted from Tamborrini et al. 2023 (Nature)

The myosin-binding protein C, cardiac-type is a protein that in humans is encoded by the MYBPC3 gene. This isoform is expressed exclusively in heart muscle during human and mouse development, and is distinct from those expressed in slow skeletal muscle (MYBPC1) and fast skeletal muscle (MYBPC2).

== Gene ==
The cloning of the human MYBPC3 cDNA and localization of the gene on human chromosome 11p11.2 has assisted the structure and function of cMyBP-C.

MYBPC3 became therefore the "best" candidate gene for the CMH4 locus for hypertrophic cardiomyopathy that was initially mapped by the group of Schwartz.

MYBPC3 mutations segregating in families with hypertrophic cardiomyopathy have been identified.

MYBPC3 was thus the fourth gene for hypertrophic cardiomyopathy, following MYH7, encoding β-myosin heavy chain, TNNT2 and TPM1, encoding cardiac troponin T and α-tropomyosin, respectively, earmarking hypertrophic cardiomyopathy (HCM) as a disease of the sarcomere.

== Structure ==
cMyBP-C is a 140.5 kDa protein composed of 1273 amino acids. cMyBP-C is a myosin-associated protein that binds at 43 nm intervals along the myosin thick filament backbone, stretching for 200 nm on either side of the M-line within the crossbridge-bearing zone (C-region) of the A band in striated muscle. The approximate stoichiometry of cMyBP-C along the thick filament is 1 per 9-10 myosin molecules, or 37 cMyBP-C molecules per thick filament. In addition to myosin, cMyBP-C also binds titin and actin. The cMyBP-C isoform expressed in cardiac muscle differs from those expressed in slow and fast skeletal muscle (MYBPC1 and MYBPC2, respectively) by three features: (1) an additional immunoglobulin (Ig)-like domain on the N-terminus, (2) a linker region between the second and third Ig domains, and (3) an additional loop in the sixth Ig domain. cMyBP-C appears necessary for normal order, filament length and lattice spacing within the structure of the sarcomere.

== Function ==
=== Role in sarcomere organization and cardiac contraction ===
cMyBP-C is not essential for sarcomere formation during embryogenesis, but is crucial for sarcomere organization and maintenance of normal cardiac function. Absence of cMyBP-C (Mybpc3-targeted knock-out mice) results in severe cardiac hypertrophy, increased heart-weight-to-body-weight-ratios, enlargement of ventricles, increased myofilament Ca2+ sensitivity and depressed diastolic and systolic function. Histologically, Mybpc3-targeted knock-out hearts display structural rearrangements with cardiac myocyte disarray and increased interstitial fibrosis similar to patients with hypertrophic cardiomyopathy, without obvious alterations in shape or size of single cardiac myocytes. Ultrastructural examination revealed a loss of lateral alignment of adjacent myofibrils with their Z-lines misaligned.

cMyBP-C appears to act as a brake on cardiac contraction, as loaded shortening, power and cycling kinetics all increase in cMyBP-C knockout mice. Consistent with this notion, cMyBP-C knockout mice exhibit an abnormal systolic timecourse, with a shortened elastance timecourse and lower peak elastance in vivo, and an accelerated force development in isolated, skinned cardiac fibers suggesting that cMyBP-C is required to constrain the crossbridges in order to sustain a normal ejection.

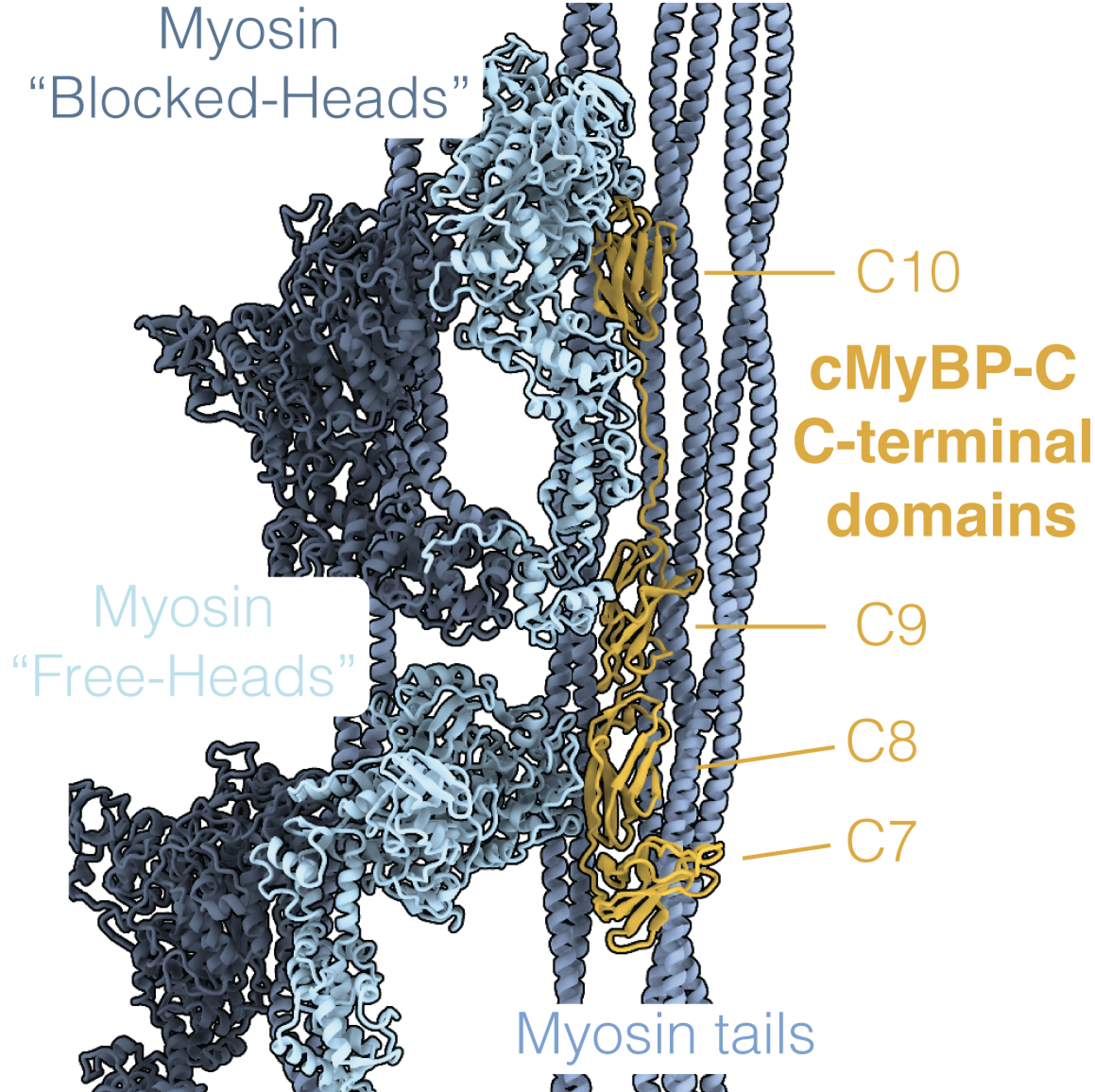
cMyBP-C binds the thick filament and stabilized the myosin heads in their OFF state. PDB: 8Q6T

=== Regulation of actomyosin interactions ===
cMyBP-C regulates the positioning of myosin and actin for interaction and acts as a tether to the myosin S1 heads, limiting their mobility. This results in a decreased number of crossbridges formed, which hinders force generation, due to its N-terminal C1-M-C2 region interacting with the myosin-S2 domain. Furthermore, cMyBP-C contributes to the regulation of cardiac contraction at short sarcomere length and is required for complete relaxation in diastole.

=== Post-translational regulation ===
Interactions of cMyBP-C with its binding partners vary with its posttranslational modification status. At least three extensively characterized phosphorylation sites (Ser273, 282 and 302; numbering refers to the mouse sequence) are localized in the M motif of cMyBP-C and are targeted by protein kinases in a hierarchical order of events. In its dephosphorylated state, cMyBP-C binds predominantly to myosin S2 and brakes crossbridge formation, however, when phosphorylated in response to β-adrenergic stimulation through activating cAMP-dependent protein kinase (PKA), it favours binding to actin, then accelerating crossbridge formation, enhancing force development and promoting relaxation.

Protein kinases identified thus far to phosphorylate cMyBP-C in the M motif are PKA, Ca^{2+}/calmodulin-dependent kinase II (CaMKII), ribosomal s6 kinase (RSK), protein kinase D (PKD), and protein kinase C (PKC). Furthermore, GSK3β was described as another protein kinase to phosphorylate cMyBP-C outside the M-domain in the proline-alanine-rich actin-binding site at Ser133 in human myocardium (mouse Ser131).

Phosphorylation is required for normal cardiac function and cMyBP-C stability, and overall phosphorylation levels of cMyBP-C are reduced in human and experimental heart failure.

Other posttranslational modifications of cMyBP-C exist, which occur throughout the protein and are not thoroughly characterised yet, such as acetylation, citrullination, S-glutathiolation, S-nitrosylation and carbonylation.

== Clinical significance ==
Truncation mutations in MYBPC3 stand as the primary cause of hypertrophic cardiomyopathy (HCM).

To date, roughly 350 mutations in MYBPC3 have been identified, and in large part, the mutations result in protein truncation, shifts in reading frames, and premature termination codons.

Genetic studies have revealed significant overlap between genotypes and phenotypes as MYBPC3 mutations can lead to various forms of cardiomyopathies, such as dilated cardiomyopathy and left ventricular noncompaction cardiomyopathy.

In patients with isolated or familial cases of dilated cardiomyopathy, MYBPC3 mutations represented the second highest number of known mutations.

Furthermore, a 25-bp intronic MYBPC3 deletion leading to protein truncation is present in 4% of the population in South India and is associated with a higher risk to develop heart failure.

Founder MYBPC3 mutations have been reported in Iceland, Italy, The Netherlands, Japan, France and Finland, where they represent a large percentage of cases with hypertrophic cardiomyopathy. All of them are truncating mutations, resulting in a shorter protein, lacking the regulatory phosphorylatable M motif and/or major binding domains to other sarcomeric proteins.

A body of evidence indicates that patients with more than one mutation often develop a more severe phenotype, and a significant fraction of childhood-onset hypertrophic cardiomyopathy (14%) is caused by compound genetic variants. This suggests that a gene-dosage effect might be responsible for manifestations at a younger age.

A total of 51 cases of homozygotes or compound heterozygotes have been reported, most of them with double truncating MYBPC3 mutations and associated with severe cardiomyopathy, leading to heart failure and death within the first year of life.

=== Pathomechanisms ===
A great understanding of how MYBPC3 mutations lead to the development of inherited cardiomyopathy came from the analyses of human myocardial samples, gene transfer in different cell lines, naturally occurring or transgenic animal models and more recently disease modeling using induced pluripotent stem cells (iPSC)-derived cardiac myocytes. Although access to human myocardial samples is difficult, at least some studies provided evidence that truncated cMyBP-Cs, resulting from truncating MYBPC3 mutations are not detectable in human patient samples by Western-immunoblot analysis. This was supported in heterozygous Mybpc3-targeted knock-in mice, carrying the human c.772G>A transition (i.e. founder mutation in Tuscany These data suggest haploinsufficiency as the main disease mechanism for heterozygous truncating mutations. A body of evidence exists that the mechanisms regulating the expression of mutant allele involve the nonsense-mediated mRNA decay, the ubiquitin-proteasome system (UPS) and the autophagy-lysosomal pathway after gene transfer of mutant MYBPC3 in cardiac myocytes or in mice in vivo. In contrast to truncating mutations, missense mutations lead, in most of the cases (although difficult to specifically detect), to stable mutant cMyBP-Cs that are, at least in part, incorporated into the sarcomere and could act as poison polypeptides on the structure and/or function of the sarcomere. Homozygous or compound heterozygous mutations are therefore likely subject to differential regulation depending on whether they are double missense, double truncating or mixed missense/truncating mutations. The homozygous Mybpc3-targeted knock-in mice, which genetically mimic the situation of severe neonatal cardiomyopathy are born without phenotype and soon after birth develop systolic dysfunction followed by (compensatory) cardiac hypertrophy. The human c.772G>A transition results in low levels of three different mutant Mybpc3 mRNAs and cMyBP-Cs in homozygous mice, suggesting a combination of haploinsufficiency and polypeptide poisoning as disease mechanism in the homozygous state. In addition, the combination of external stress (such as neurohumoral stress or aging) and Mybpc3 mutations have been shown to impair the UPS in mice, and proteasomal activities were also depressed in patients with hypertrophic cardiomyopathy or dilated cardiomyopathy.

Skinned trabeculae or cardiac myocytes obtained from human patients carrying a MYBPC3 mutation or from heterozygous and homozygous Mybpc3-targeted knock-in mice exhibited higher myofilament Ca2+ sensitivity than controls. Disease-modeling by engineered heart tissue (EHT) technology with cardiac cells from heterozygous or homozygous Mybpc3-targeted knock-in mice reproduced observations made in human and mouse studies displaying abbreviated contractions, greater sensitivity to external Ca2+ and smaller inotropic responses to various drugs (isoprenaline, EMD 57033 and verapamil) compared to wild-type control EHTs. Therefore, EHTs are suitable to model the disease phenotype and recapitulate functional alterations found in mice with hypertrophic cardiomyopathy. Another good system for modeling cardiomyopathies in the cell culture dish is the derivation of cardiac myocytes from iPSC. Reports of human iPSC models of sarcomeric cardiomyopathies showed cellular hypertrophy in most of the cases, including one with the c.2995_3010del MYBPC3 mutation that exhibited in addition to hypertrophy contractile variability in the presence of endothelin-1.

=== As a drug target ===
Because of their tissue selectivity and persistent expression recombinant adeno-associated viruses (AAV) have therapeutic potential in the treatment of inherited cardiomyopathy resulting from MYBPC3 mutations- Several targeting approaches have been developed. The most recent is genome editing to correct a mutation by CRISPR/Cas9 technology. Naturally existing as part of the prokaryotic immune system, the CRISPR/Cas9 system has been used for correction of mutations in the mammalian genome. By inducing nicks in the double-stranded DNA and providing a template DNA sequence, it is possible to repair mutations by homologous recombination. This approach has not yet been evaluated for MYBPC3 mutations, but it could be used for each single or clustered mutation, and therefore applied preferentially for frequent founder MYBPC3 mutations.

Other strategies targeting the mutant pre-mRNA by exon skipping and/or spliceosome-mediated RNA trans-splicing (SMaRT) have been evaluated for MYBPC3. Exon skipping can be achieved using antisense oligonucleotide (AON) masking exonic splicing enhancer sequences and therefore preventing binding of the splicing machinery and therefore resulting in exclusion of the exon from the mRNA. This approach can be applied when the resulting shorter, but in-frame translated protein maintains its function. Proof-of-concept of exon skipping was recently shown in homozygous Mybpc3-targeted knock-in mice. Systemic administration of AAV-based AONs to Mybpc3-targeted knock-in newborn mice prevented both systolic dysfunction and left ventricular hypertrophy, at least for the duration of the investigated period. For the human MYBPC3 gene, skipping of 6 single exons or 5 double exons with specific AONs would result in shortened in-frame cMyBP-Cs, allowing the preservation of the functionally important phosphorylation and protein interaction sites. With this approach, about half of missense or exonic/intronic truncating mutations could be removed, including 35 mutations in exon 25. The other strategy targeting the mutant pre-mRNA is SMaRT. Hereby, two independently transcribed molecules, the mutant pre-mRNA and the therapeutic pre-trans-splicing molecule carrying the wild-type sequence are spliced together to give rise to a repaired full-length mRNA. Recently, the feasibility of this method was shown both in isolated cardiac myocytes and in vivo in the heart of homozygous Mybpc3-targeted knock-in mice, although the efficiency of the process was low and the amount of repaired protein was not sufficient to prevent the development of the cardiac disease phenotype. In principle, however, this SmART strategy is superior to exon skipping or CRISPR/Cas9 genome editing and still attractive, because only two pre-trans-splicing molecules, targeting the 5' and the 3' of MYBPC3 pre-mRNA would be sufficient to bypass all MYBPC3 mutations associated with cardiomyopathies and therefore repair the mRNA.

AAV-mediated gene transfer of the full-length Mybpc3 (defined as "gene replacement") dose-dependently prevents the development of cardiac hypertrophy and dysfunction in homozygous Mybpc3-targeted knock-in mice. The dose-dependent expression of exogenous Mybpc3 was associated with the down-regulation of endogenous mutant Mybpc3. Additional expression of a sarcomeric protein is expected to replace partially or completely the endogenous protein level in the sarcomere, as it has been shown in transgenic mice expressing sarcomeric proteins.
