= Stewie (cat) =

World's longest cat ever (c. 2005 – 2013)

- Stewie next to a slinky dog, showing his length
- Other name: Mymains Stewart Gilligan
- Species: Felis catus
- Breed: Maine Coon
- Sex: Male
- Born: 2005; Hermiston, Oregon
- Died: February 4, 2013 (aged 7–8); Reno, Nevada
- Known for: Longest cat (domestic)
- Title: Longest cat (domestic)
- Term: 28 August 2010 – 4 February 2013
- Predecessor: Leo
- Successor: Lupo
- Owners: Robin Hendrickson and Erik Brandsness
- Weight: 15.7 kg (35 lb; 2 st 7 lb)

Stewie, a Maine Coon, (c. 2005 – February 4, 2013) was the world's longest domestic cat according to the Guinness Book of World Records. Stewie was measured at 123 cm (48 in) and 15.7 kg (34.6 lb) on August 28, 2010. He also has the record for the longest cat tail.

Stewie died on February 4, 2013, from cancer at his home in Reno, Nevada, at age 8.

== Early life ==
Stewie and his brother, Odin (known then as Dylan and Dallas), were born under the care of Valerie Horton at Mymains Cattery in Hermiston, Oregon. Robin Hendrickson bought them from her in 2005, who described meeting them as "love at first sight: Dallas with his fluffy full coat, and Dylan with almost no fur, and no whiskers either!" She named Stewie after Stewie Griffin, because he was always at her feet (and since she was a fan of Family Guy).

== First world record ==
Robin began to take Stewie to cat shows, who "was in his element,". Other cat owners commented on how big the Maine Coon had gotten, which intrigued Robin. When the cat was two and a half years old, she found that he was close in length to the previous world record holder, Leo. When first measured, he did not beat Leo, but in 2010, he measured again and acquired the Guinness World Record.

== Therapy work ==
After achieving his first world record, Stewie was trained and quickly certified to become a therapy cat, and visited local hospitals and a Reno, Nevada senior center. Some patients mentioned his tail length, which led Stewie to gain his second world record. Stewie also attended humane society adoption events through the Nevada Humane Society.

== Death ==
In 2012, Stewie was diagnosed with the Lymphosarcoma cancer. He was declared cancer-free after a round of chemotherapy, but soon after he died from an aggressive tumor that was found in his kidneys. His owner stated that "Stewie was always very social and loved meeting new people... he has touched many lives, and for that I am grateful."

Stewie was succeeded by Ludo, who measured 5 centimeters shorter than Stewie.

== See also ==
- List of individual cats
- Longcat, a Japanese domestic cat known for her length

Records
Preceded by Leo	Longest cat (domestic); 28 August 2010 – 4 February 2013	Succeeded by Lupo
