= Dog-like cat =

Behavioral pattern found in domestic cats

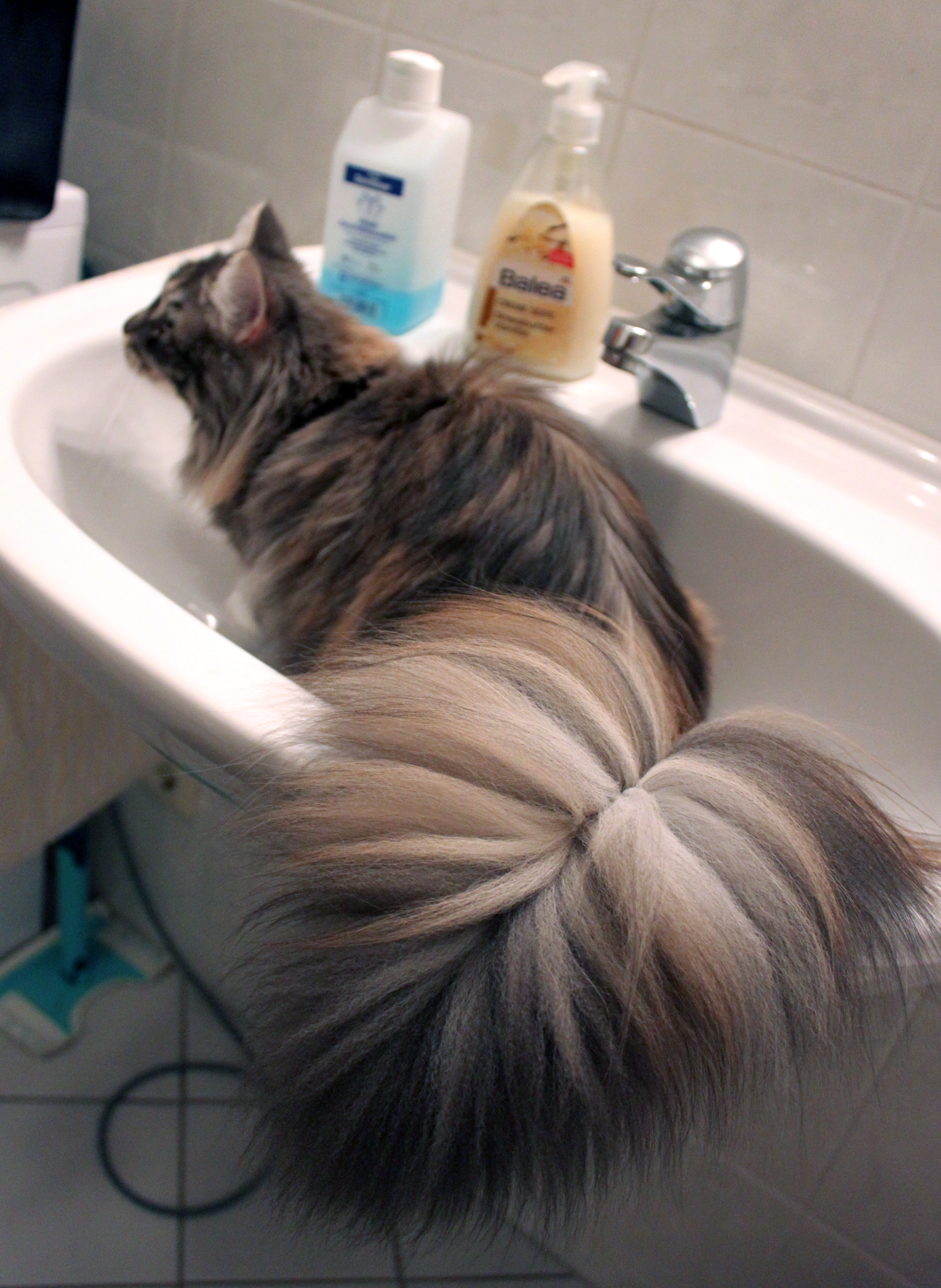
Some Maine Coon felines follow their owner from one part of a room to another, jumping onto objects such as sinks, counters, and so on in order to maintain their owner's attention.

Dog-like cat (also canine-like cat, puppy cat, puppy-like cat, and so on) is a term in popular culture that refers to specific breeds of domestic cats that have unusual behavioral tendencies reminiscent of young domestic dogs. These are within the scope of feline behavior, and may be enhanced through selective breeding. These behaviors, not specific to any breed, include following people around from room to room, the desire to receive frequent physical affection such as being held and petted, a lack of aggression toward some fellow animals, and a placid nature. Certain owners may successfully attempt to train their cats to perform on command, such as via clicker training, akin to canines and other domesticated animals.

While these attributes are found desirable for owners interacting with their cats, problems can occur when these felines are exposed to aggressive dogs and humans who wish to maliciously harm them, with the cats possibly being too trusting and too friendly for their own well-being.

Breeds known for these behaviors include the Abyssinian, Burmese, Maine Coon, Manx, and Ragdoll. However, dog-related behavior traits can appear regardless of breed.

== Breeds ==
The cultural assumption that cats are distant from people and lack affection compared to dogs is false. Animals have individual characteristics based on their environment, particularly their past interactions with people. The nature of selective breeding for both canines and felines varies dramatically across different human cultures as well, with distinctive traits (such as fertility, lifespan, speed, etc.) receiving emphasis depending on the historical context.

The feline temperament is particularly malleable to a wide set of environmental factors, especially sudden stresses. For example, after dangerous floods in Canvey Island, cats showed behaviors of psychological shock akin to human struggles. Well-raised kittens frequently demonstrate affection towards humans and a pleasant, docile nature regardless of pedigree. These broad traits are not specific to any particular breed, as the upbringing of the animal is an important factor. Positive interaction with humans in the first few months of life is particularly vital.

Most feline pets in the United States are considered to be "domestic short-haired cats", a catch-all term for those with mixed or otherwise unclear ancestries but having related appearances. These types of felines are sometimes known as "moggies" in the United Kingdom. Several of those cats, or those of the standardized American Shorthair breed, will respond differently to others despite looking very similar, displaying dog-like or otherwise unexpected tendencies. Besides breed-based generalizations, a particular cat's behavior can be assessed by its restraint in using claws during play, its tendency to follow people, and its appreciation of close, frequent human contact.

=== Abyssinian ===
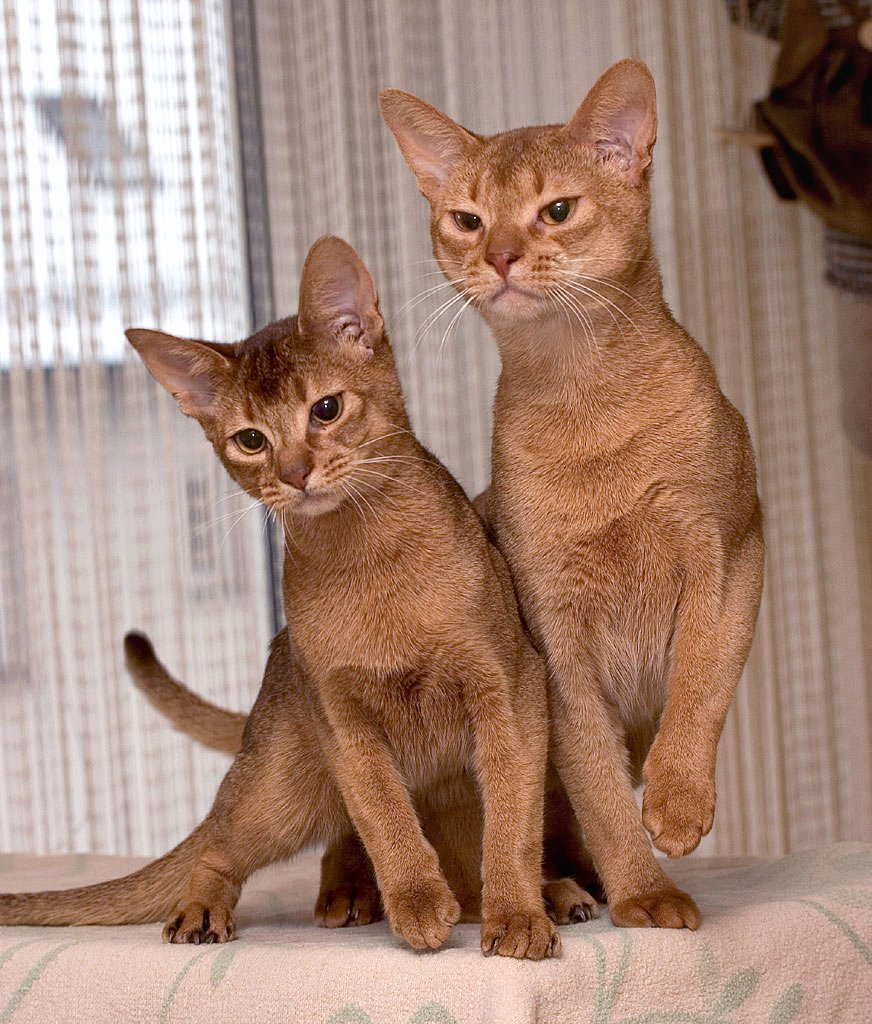
Abyssinians often crave attention and enjoy the presence of dogs.

Abyssinian cats are known for demanding attention and showing depression if left alone too often. The closeness to their owners causes some of them to respond positively to feline leash training. Unlike most cats, Abyssinians often show interest in water rather than a fear of it. A frequently active breed, Abyssinians will often climb upon their owners and perch upon their bodies to see. They also tend to welcome the company of friendly-minded dogs.

Veterinarian Joan O. Joshua has said the "dog-like attachment to the owners" of Abyssinians causes "greater dependence on human contacts". This stands in contrast to the mere "tolerant acceptance of human company" based on "comforts" that multiple other breeds display. With their interest in playing with their owners combined with their curious intelligence, Abyssinians are nicknamed the "Clowns of the Cat Kingdom."

=== Burmese ===
The Burmese breed typically displays the dog-like attachment seen in Abyssinians. They both also share the combination of high intelligence and tendency to stay close that makes training them to be on a leash practical. The Burmese are persistently more vocal than other breeds, this leading VCA Animal Hospitals to state that the typical one "enjoys engaging in conversation". Their energetic nature also encourages play to an extent far more commonly associated with dogs.

=== Maine Coon ===
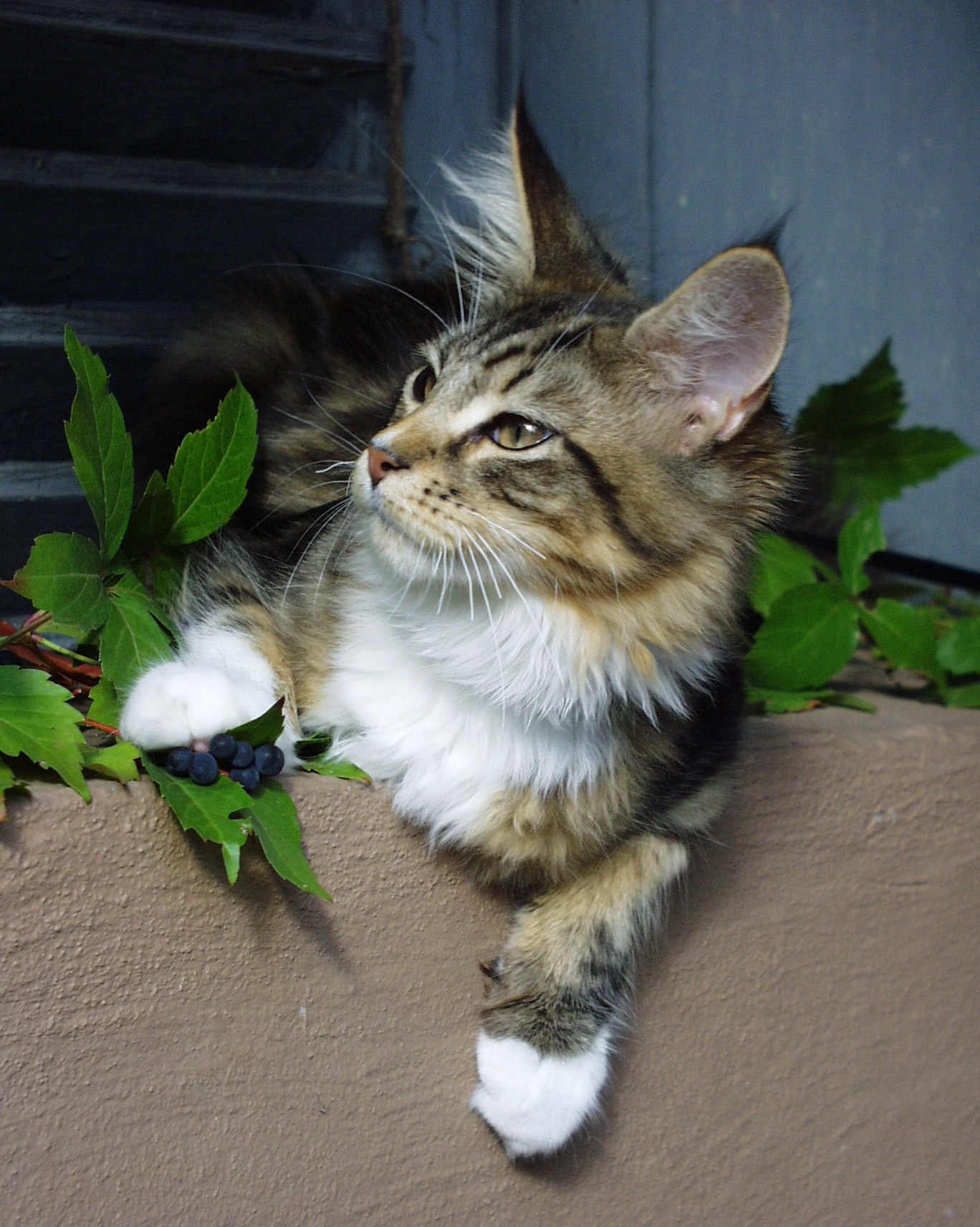
Maine Coons tag along with their owners while also being trainable.

Maine Coons are, according to Academy of Veterinary Nutrition Technicians President Kara Burns and Dr. Lori Renda-Francis, "often referred to as 'dog like'." This description is not only due to their large size and stature but also because of the cats' usually pleasant mannerisms plus their tendency to closely follow their owners and obey them. Maine Coon cats additionally are often trainable given their intelligence and affectionate nature. The felines have large and silky coats yet grooming is made easier given their desire to be frequently handled. According to the Cat Fanciers' Association, Maine Coons offer "hours of enjoyment with their antics but can at times be intrusive. Without question they want to be part of everything".

=== Manx ===
The Manx breed displays behaviors akin to puppies, such as coming when their owners whistle or call their names. They are known for jumping and climbing about obstacles as well as burying things, even collecting and burying toys at times. Manx felines will also display strong affection generally. Dr. David Taylor, writer and founder of the International Zoo Veterinary Group, has said they are "positively dog-like".

=== Ragdoll ===
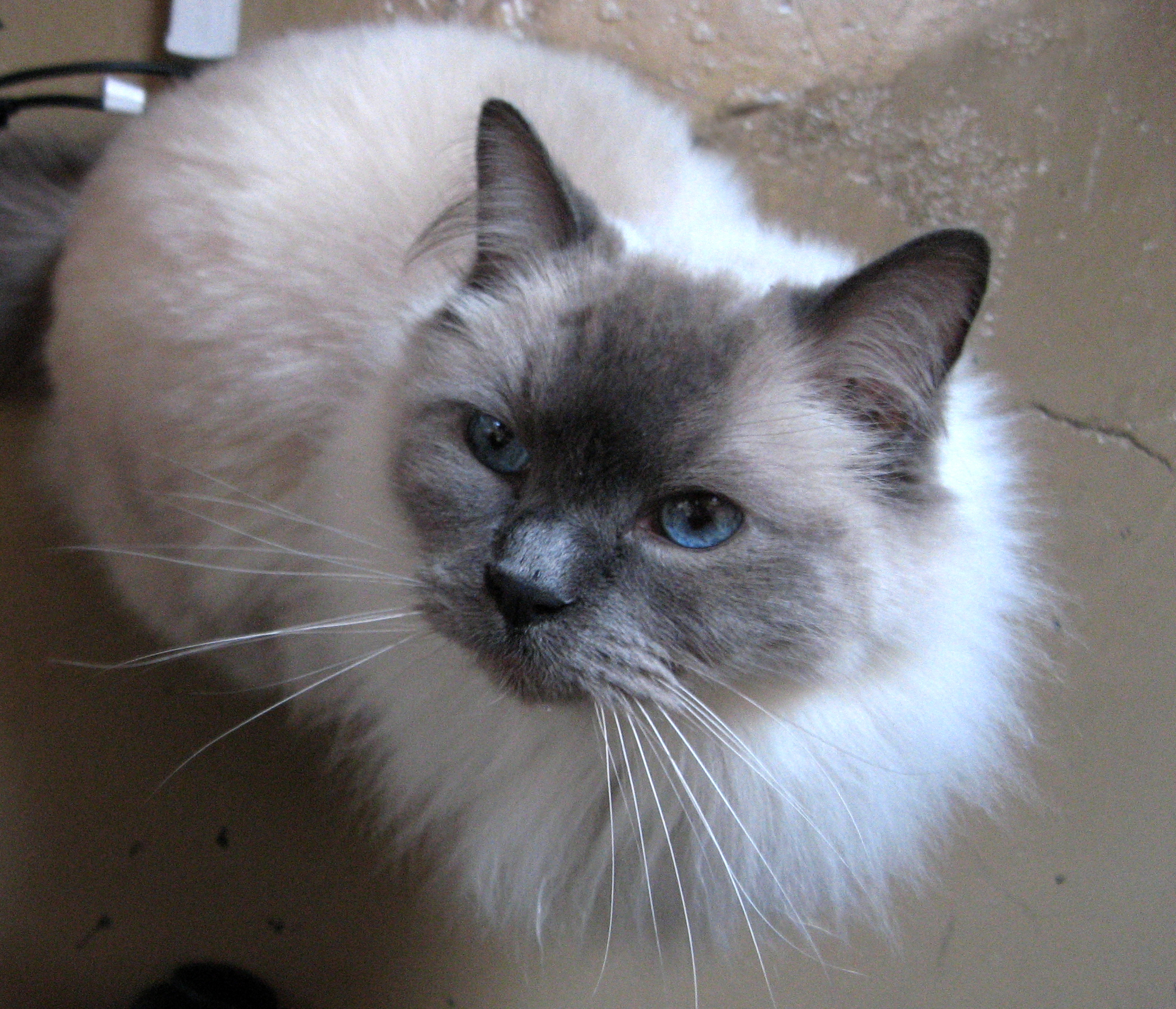
Ragdolls can play fetch.

Ragdolls are named for an earlier tendency of the breed to go limp when picked up, and their tendencies to rest in a doll-like, bent position. They usually display a calm, relaxed temperament, with the animals often seeking physical affection from owners and following owners around. They sometimes play games such as fetch.

== See also ==
- Cat behavior
- Cat communication
- Cat intelligence
- Cat culture
- Human interaction with cats
- A Kitten Named Woof
