= Human engineered cardiac tissues =

Human engineered cardiac tissues (hECTs) are derived by experimental manipulation of pluripotent stem cells, such as human embryonic stem cells (hESCs) and, more recently, human induced pluripotent stem cells (hiPSCs) to differentiate into human cardiomyocytes. Interest in these bioengineered cardiac tissues has risen due to their potential use in cardiovascular research and clinical therapies. These tissues provide a unique in vitro model to study cardiac physiology with a species-specific advantage over cultured animal cells in experimental studies. hECTs also have therapeutic potential for in vivo regeneration of heart muscle. hECTs provide a valuable resource to reproduce the normal development of human heart tissue, understand the development of human cardiovascular disease (CVD), and may lead to engineered tissue-based therapies for CVD patients.

== Generation ==
hESCs and hiPSCs are the primary cells used to generate hECTs. Human pluripotent stem cells are differentiated into cardiomyocytes (hPSC-CMs) in culture through a milieu containing small-molecule mediators (e.g. cytokines, growth and transcription factors). Transforming hPSC-CMs into hECTs incorporates the use of 3-dimensional (3D) tissue scaffolds to mimic the natural physiological environment of the heart. This 3D scaffold, along with collagen – a major component of the cardiac extracellular matrix – provides the appropriate conditions to promote cardiomyocyte organization, growth and differentiation.

== Characteristics ==
At the intracellular level, hECTs exhibit several essential structural features of cardiomyocytes, including organized sarcomeres, gap-junctions, and sarcoplasmic reticulum structures; however, the distribution and organization of many of these structures is characteristic of neonatal heart tissue rather than adult human heart muscle. Recently, the combined effects of electrical and dynamic stimulation were found to significantly enhance the functional maturation of hECTs, resulting in improved alignment, structure, and organization, enhanced calcium handling capacity, increased expression of contractile and structural protein genes, and enhanced vascular network formation, closely resembling healthy in vivo conditions. hECTs also express key cardiac genes (α-MHC, SERCA2a and ACTC1) nearing the levels seen in the adult heart. Analogous to the characteristics of ECTs from animal models, hECTs beat spontaneously and reconstitute many fundamental physiological responses of normal heart muscle, such as the Frank-Starling mechanism and sensitivity to calcium. hECTs show dose-dependent responses to certain drugs, such as morphological changes in action potentials due to ion channel blockers and modulation of contractile properties by inotropic and lusitropic agents.

== Experimental and clinical applications ==
Even with current technologies, hECT structure and function is more at the level of newborn heart muscle than adult myocardium. Nonetheless, important advances have led to the generation of hECT patches for myocardial repair in animal models and use for in vitro models of drug screening. hECTs can also be used to experimentally model CVD using genetic manipulation and adenoviral-mediated gene transfer. In animal models of myocardial infarction (MI), hECT injection into the hearts of rats and mice reduces infarct size and improves heart function and contractility. As a proof of principle, grafts of engineered heart tissues have been implanted in rats following MI with beneficial effects on left ventricular function. The use of hECTs in generating tissue engineered heart valves is also being explored to improve current heart valve constructs for in vivo animal studies. As tissue engineering technology advances to overcome current limitations, hECTs are a promising avenue for experimental drug discovery, screening and disease modelling and in vivo repair.
