= MYBPC1 =

Protein-coding gene in the species Homo sapiens

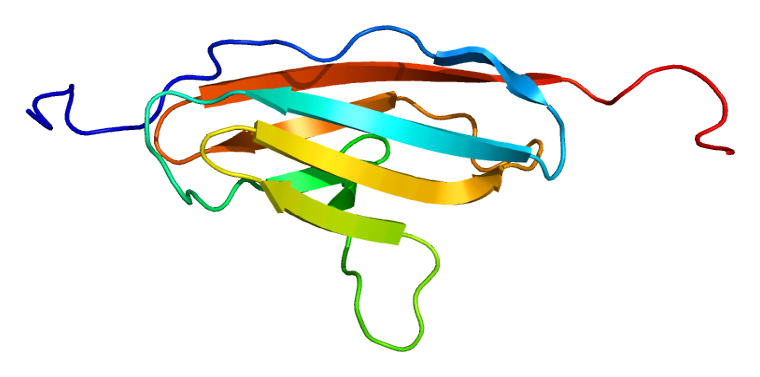

Identifiers
- Aliases: MYBPC1, LCCS4, MYBPCC, MYBPCS, myosin binding protein C, slow type, ssMyBP-C, MYOTREM, myosin binding protein C1
- External IDs: OMIM: 160794; MGI: 1336213; GeneCards: MYBPC1
Available structures
PDB	Human UniProt search: PDBe RCSB
PDB	List of PDB id codes 1X44, 2DAV, 2YUV, 2YUW, 2YUX, 2YUZ, 2YXM

Gene location (Human)
Chr.	Chromosome 12 (human)
Band	12q23.2	Start	101,568,353 bp
Band	12q23.2	End	101,686,028 bp

Gene location (Mouse)
Chr.	Chromosome 10 (mouse)
Band	10|10 C1	Start	88,354,141 bp
Band	10|10 C1	End	88,441,014 bp
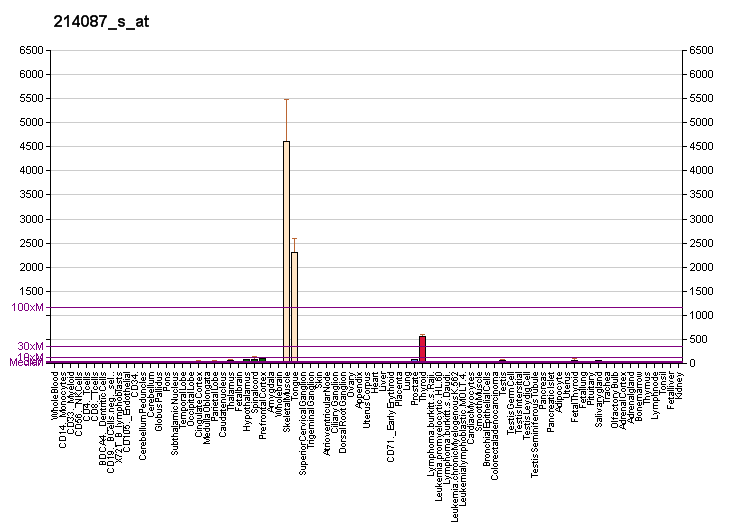
RNA expression pattern
Bgee	Human / Mouse (ortholog); Top expressed in: Skeletal muscle tissue of rectus abdominis; biceps brachii; Skeletal muscle tissue of biceps brachii; deltoid muscle; gastrocnemius muscle; glutes; vastus lateralis muscle; muscle of thigh; triceps brachii muscle; thoracic diaphragm / Top expressed in: temporal muscle; ankle; soleus muscle; sternocleidomastoid muscle; digastric muscle; tibialis anterior muscle; extraocular muscle; thoracic diaphragm; vastus lateralis muscle; gastrocnemius muscle; More reference expression data
BioGPS	More reference expression data
Gene ontology
Molecular function	actin binding; structural constituent of muscle; protein binding; titin binding; actin filament binding; muscle alpha-actinin binding; structural molecule activity conferring elasticity
Cellular component	myosin filament; cytosol; myofibril; muscle myosin complex; Z discdkac; M band; striated muscle thin filament; sarcomere
Biological process	cell adhesion; muscle contraction; muscle filament sliding; striated muscle contraction; actin filament organization; sarcomere organization; striated muscle myosin thick filament assembly; skeletal muscle thin filament assembly; skeletal muscle myosin thick filament assembly; cardiac myofibril assembly; cardiac muscle tissue morphogenesis
Sources:Amigo / QuickGO
Orthologs
Databases	NCBI: entry; OMA: entry
Species	Human	Mouse
Entrez	4604	109272
Ensembl	ENSG00000196091	ENSMUSG00000020061
UniProt	Q00872	n/a
RefSeq (mRNA)	NM_001254718; NM_001254719; NM_001254720; NM_001254721; NM_001254722 NM_001254723; NM_002465; NM_206819; NM_206820; NM_206821; NM_001404675; NM_001404676; NM_001404677; NM_001404678; NM_001404679; NM_001404680; NM_001404681	NM_001252372; NM_175418
RefSeq (protein)	NP_001241647; NP_001241648; NP_001241649; NP_001241650; NP_001241651 NP_001241652; NP_002456; NP_996555; NP_996556; NP_996557	n/a
Location (UCSC)	Chr 12: 101.57 – 101.69 Mb	Chr 10: 88.35 – 88.44 Mb
PubMed search
- Wikidata
View/Edit Human	View/Edit Mouse

Myosin-binding protein C, slow-type is a protein that in humans is encoded by the MYBPC1 gene.
