= MYBPC2 =

Protein-coding gene in the species Homo sapiens

Identifiers
- Aliases: MYBPC2, MYBPC, MYBPCF, myosin binding protein C, fast type, fsMyBP-C, myosin binding protein C2
- External IDs: OMIM: 160793; MGI: 1336170; GeneCards: MYBPC2
Available structures
PDB	Ortholog search: PDBe RCSB
PDB	List of PDB id codes 2E7C, 2EDK, 2EDN

Gene location (Human)
Chr.	Chromosome 19 (human)
Band	19q13.33	Start	50,432,892 bp
Band	19q13.33	End	50,466,321 bp

Gene location (Mouse)
Chr.	Chromosome 7 (mouse)
Band	7|7 B3	Start	44,151,123 bp
Band	7|7 B3	End	44,174,080 bp
RNA expression pattern
Bgee	Human / Mouse (ortholog); Top expressed in: vastus lateralis muscle; muscle of thigh; Skeletal muscle tissue of rectus abdominis; triceps brachii muscle; biceps brachii; Skeletal muscle tissue of biceps brachii; gastrocnemius muscle; thoracic diaphragm; glutes; body of tongue / Top expressed in: triceps brachii muscle; vastus lateralis muscle; medial head of gastrocnemius muscle; temporal muscle; knee joint; sternocleidomastoid muscle; tibialis anterior muscle; muscle of thigh; digastric muscle; skeletal muscle tissue; More reference expression data
BioGPS	n/a
Gene ontology
Molecular function	actin binding; structural constituent of muscle; protein binding; actin filament binding; muscle alpha-actinin binding; structural molecule activity conferring elasticity
Cellular component	myosin filament; cytosol; muscle myosin complex; Z discdkac; M band; striated muscle thin filament; sarcomere
Biological process	cell adhesion; muscle contraction; muscle filament sliding; striated muscle contraction; actin filament organization; sarcomere organization; striated muscle myosin thick filament assembly; skeletal muscle thin filament assembly; skeletal muscle myosin thick filament assembly; cardiac myofibril assembly; cardiac muscle tissue morphogenesis
Sources:Amigo / QuickGO
Orthologs
Databases	NCBI: entry; OMA: entry
Species	Human	Mouse
Entrez	4606	233199
Ensembl	ENSG00000086967	ENSMUSG00000038670
UniProt	Q14324	Q5XKE0
RefSeq (mRNA)	NM_004533	NM_146189
RefSeq (protein)	NP_004524	NP_666301
Location (UCSC)	Chr 19: 50.43 – 50.47 Mb	Chr 7: 44.15 – 44.17 Mb
PubMed search
- Wikidata
View/Edit Human	View/Edit Mouse

Myosin binding protein C, fast type is a protein that in humans is encoded by the MYBPC2 gene.

== Function ==
This gene encodes a member of the myosin-binding protein C family. This family includes the fast-, slow- and cardiac-type isoforms, each of which is a myosin-associated protein found in the cross-bridge-bearing zone (C region) of A bands in striated muscle. The protein encoded by this locus is referred to as the fast-type isoform. Mutations in the related but distinct genes encoding the slow-type and cardiac-type isoforms have been associated with distal arthrogryposis, type 1 and hypertrophic cardiomyopathy, respectively.
