= Turkish cat =

Turkish cat may refer to:

- Turkish Van, formerly "Turkish cat", a standardised breed of domestic cat developed in modern times in the UK from Turkish stock
- Turkish Angora, a now-standardised domestic cat breed that developed in Turkey from the Early Modern period on
- Van cat, a landrace (or "natural breed") of mostly free-roaming domestic cats in the Lake Van region of Turkey, believed by some to be ancestral to the Turkish Van
