= Turkish Van =

Breed of domestic cat

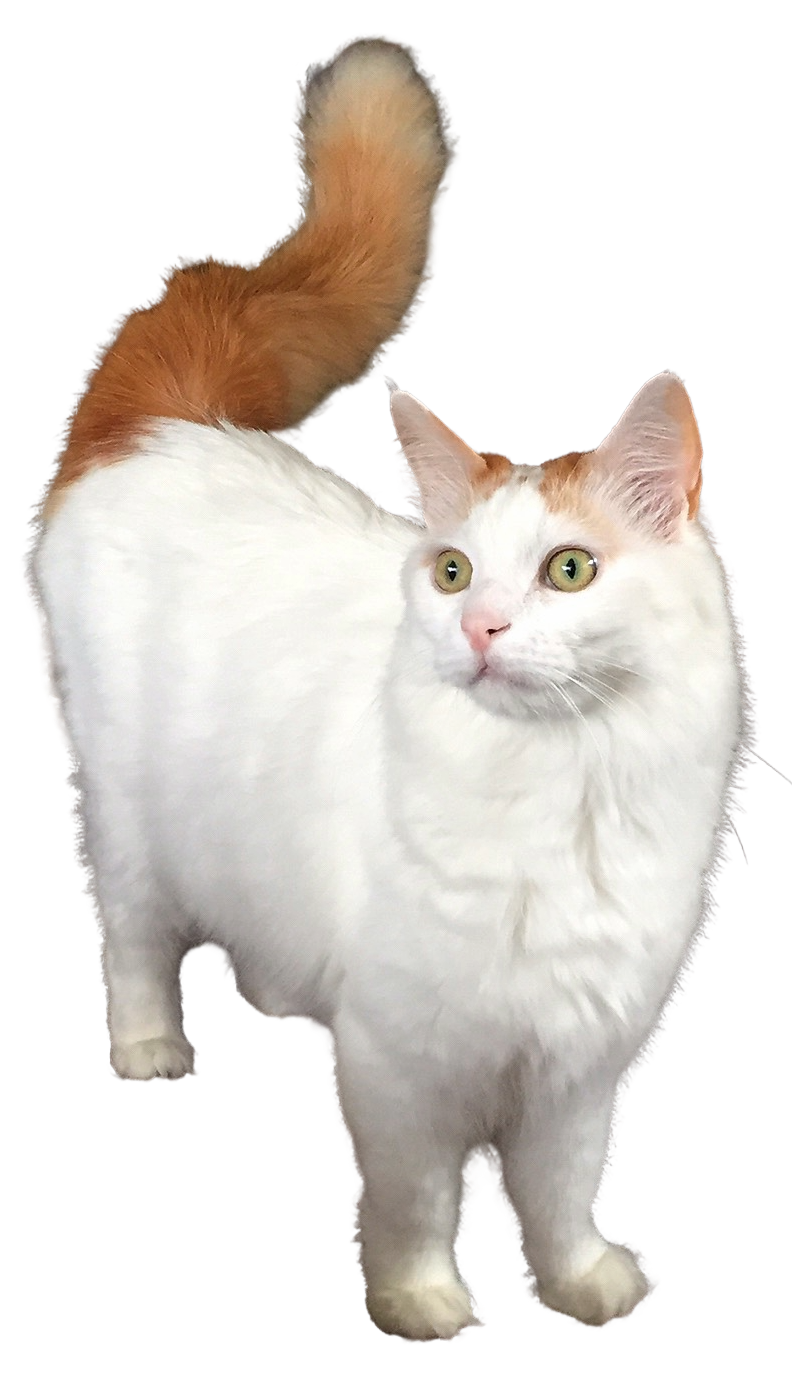
- Red tabby and white male
- Other names: Turkish cat (obsolete)
- Common nicknames: Swimming Cat
- Origin: United Kingdom
- Foundation bloodstock: Turkey Van-patterned landrace

Breed standards
- CFA: standard
- FIFe: standard
- TICA: standard
- ACF: standard
- ACFA/CAA: standard
- GCCF: standard
- Other: AACE standard

The Turkish Van (Turkish: Türk Vanı) is a semi-long-haired, standardised breed of domestic cat, which was developed during the 1950s in the United Kingdom from a selection of cats obtained from various cities of modern-day Turkey, especially southeast Turkey. This rare cat breed is one of the larger ones, and is distinguished by the Van pattern (named after the breed), where the colour is restricted to the head and the tail, and the rest of the cat is white; this is due to the expression of the white spotting gene, a type of partial leucism. A Turkish Van may have blue or orange eyes, or be odd-eyed (having one eye of each colour).

The breed was initially registered under the name Turkish cat in 1969 by UK-based Governing Council of the Cat Fancy (GCCF). It was later renamed Turkish Van to better distinguish it from the Turkish Angora breed. The Turkish Van has been claimed to be descended from (and is often confused with) the landrace of usually solid white Van cats, mostly found near Lake Van, though one of the two original breeders' own writings indicate clearly that none of the Turkish Van's foundation cats came from the Van area.

== History ==
Van Iskenderun Guzeli, one of the founders of the breed, was imported from Hatay Province in 1955 by Laura Lushington; with her kitten Van Kehribar

In 1955, two British photographers, Laura Lushington and Sonia Halliday, while on assignment in Turkey for the Turkish Ministry of Tourism, were given two unrelated cats in Turkey, which Lushington took home with her and allowed to mate. When the offspring came out identical to their parents – chalk white with dark tail and head markings – she set to establishing a standardised breed, originally named Turkish cat, later Turkish Van, and having it recognised by the British cat fancy organisations. Lushington returned to Turkey to find another pair, with the goal of breeding to the standard "three clear generations".

According to Lushington, her original imported cats were: Van Iskenderun Guzelli (female), a cat that came from Hatay Province, Iskenderun, and Stambul Byzantium (male), a cat given by a hotel manager in Istanbul, both in 1955. Two later additions to the gene pool were Antalya Anatolia (female), from the city of Antalya, and Burdur (male), from Burdur city, both in 1959. Lushington did not see Van city before 1963, and only stayed there "for two days and two nights". It is unclear why the name "Turkish Van" was chosen, or why one of the original 1955 kittens was named Van Iskenderun Guzelli, given their provenance. Of the founding 1955 pair, Lushington wrote, in 1977:

I was first given a pair of Van kittens in 1955 while travelling in Turkey, and decided to bring them back to England, although touring by car and mainly camping at the time – the fact that they survived in good condition showed up the great adaptability and intelligence of their breed in trying circumstances. Experience showed that they bred absolutely true. They were not known in Britain at that time and, because they make such intelligent and charming pets, I decided to try to establish the breed, and to have it recognised officially in Britain by the GCCF.

It is unclear whether Lushington was intending to imply that the Hatay and Istanbul kittens had originally come from the Lake Van region, or was simply referring to the Turkish Van foundation stock as "Van kittens" for short. Neither city is near Van Province, and there is no evidence that specimens of the Van cat landrace were ever among the foundation stock.

== Breed registration ==
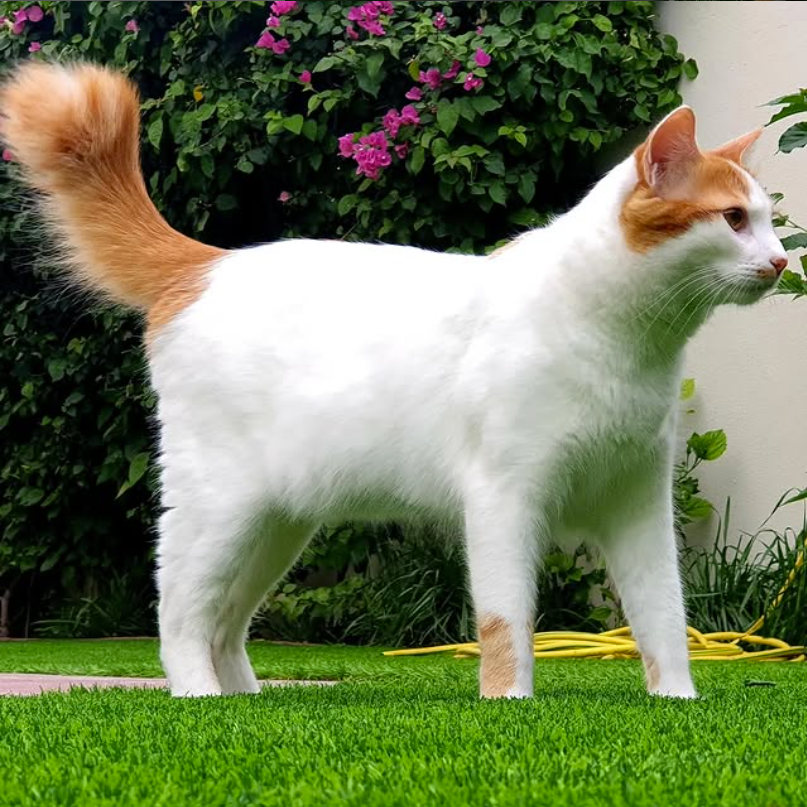
Red tabby and white male outdoors

The Turkish Van was given full pedigree status in 1969 by the GCCF. Called simply the Turkish cat at this point, the name was changed in 1979 in the UK (1985 in the US) to Turkish Van to better distance the breed from the Turkish Angora cat (originally called simply Angora, an old spelling of Ankara).

The Turkish Van began to be imported into the US in the 1970s. Beginning in 1983, two Florida breeders, Barbara and Jack Reark, worked to popularise this breed, and in 1985, The International Cat Association (TICA) granted the Turkish Van championship status. In 1988, the Cat Fanciers' Association (CFA) accepted the breed for registration in the miscellaneous class. The CFA later bestowed provisional status to the Van in 1993, and championship status in 1994. In that first year, four Turkish Vans attained the grand title.

=== Popularity ===
The breed is considered relatively rare. In 2024, only 49 Turkish Van kittens —representing approx. 0,1% of their total registrations, or rank 40 out of 54 breeds— were registered with the Fédération Internationale Féline (FIFe), one of the major global cat registries.

== Conservation in Turkey ==
In Turkey, the native all-white Van cat (Van kedisi) is regarded as a national treasure and is the focus of a conservation program at Van Yüzüncü Yıl University in the city of Van, which operates a Van Cat Research and Application Center to protect the cat and preserve its original genetic characteristics. The centre keeps the cats at a dedicated "Van Cat House" (Van Kedi Evi), where kittens are raised and offered for adoption; it reported around 120 births in 2025.

== Characteristics ==
=== Appearance ===
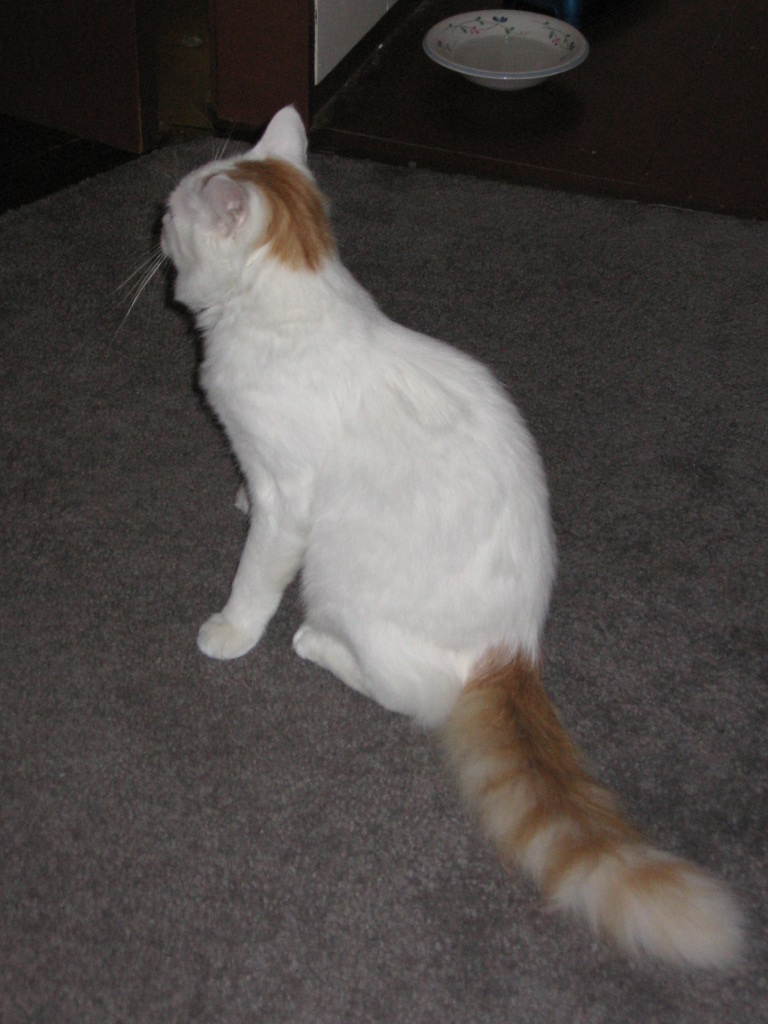
"Ringed" tail pattern

The Turkish Van is a large, muscular cat with a moderately long body and tail. It has strong, broad shoulders and a short neck; the jock of the cat world. The body of a Van should neither be stocky, or thin. It should call to mind the body build of an athlete, and indeed, it is one of the largest cats. They take from 3 to 5 years to reach their full maturity and when they do males range in weight from 5–9 kg (10–20 lb) with females ranging from 3–5 kg (7–12 lb).

The coat on a Turkish Van is considered semi-long-haired. While many cats have three distinct hair types in their coat – guard hair, awn hair, and down hair – the Turkish Van has no evident undercoat; only one coat layer. This makes their coat feel like cashmere or rabbit fur. The lack of an undercoat gives a sleek appearance and a smooth, cottony texture, which sets it apart from other breeds. The coat is uncommonly water repellent, which makes bathing these cats a challenge, though the coat dries quickly. The aforementioned Angora-like texture of the fur also makes it densely clump when groomed, and in larger quantities can be used as a yarn or fabric substitute if properly prepared for such, with 'cat-gora' wool being a humane, sustainable alternative to Angora rabbit fur. The breed actually has two lengths of hair, determined by season, and sheds its fur continuously. In the winter, the hair is thick and long. In the summer, the hair sheds to leave a shorter, lighter coat. The coat begins short and faintly coloured at birth and grows in gradually over a period of three to five years, so that the kittens may be short-haired in appearance, with thin tails, but as they mature, the fur on the chest will fill out, and the tail will thicken into a full brush tail, which often features a ringed pattern. The tail does not shed hair or change according to the season, but remains long and full. The ears remain feathered with fur, so that even with its summer coat, the Van looks soft and fluffy.

The Turkish Van is one of the larger cat breeds. Ideal type should feature broad shoulders with a body that is "top-heavy", that is, a cat with its centre of gravity forward. The cat is moderately long, and its back legs are slightly longer than its front legs, but neither the cat itself nor its legs are so long as to be disproportionate. They have large paws and rippling hard muscle structure which allows them to be very strong jumpers. Vans can easily hit the top of a refrigerator from a cold start on the floor. They are slow to mature and this process can take 3 years, possibly longer. Vans have been known to reach 1 m (3 ft) long from nose to tip of tail.

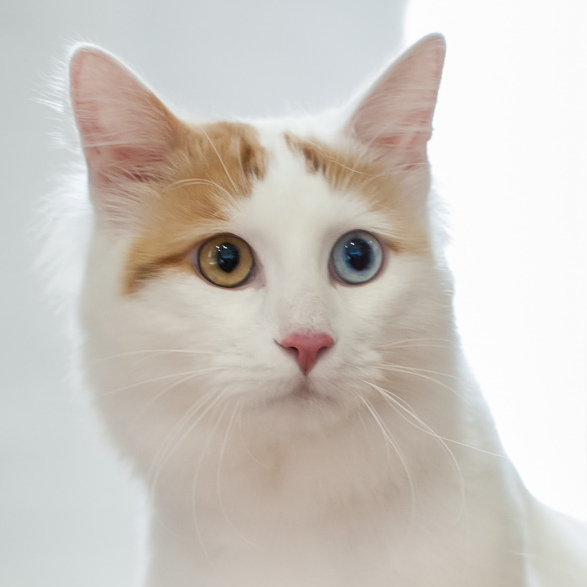
Red tabby and white odd-eyed male

A Turkish Van may have blue, deep-warm copper-orange, or odd eyes (having one eye of each colour, a condition known as heterochromia iridis).

The breed typically has very large ears when it is a kitten, growing into its ears over time. The nose is straight and Asiatic, considered long for a semi-longhair, and with its high cheek bones, and startlingly bright eyes, it gives off quite an exotic appearance.

==== Colour varieties ====
Breed standards allow for one or more body spots as long as there is no more than 20% colour and the cat does not give the appearance of a bicolour. A few random spots are acceptable, but they should not detract from the pattern. The rest of the cat is white. Although red tabby and white is the classic Van colour, the colour on a Van's head and tail can be one of the following:

- red,
- cream,
- black,
- blue.

All these base colours are allowed in combination with tabby and tortoiseshell patterns. Colourpoints are not allowed. Not all registries recognise all of these colour variations.

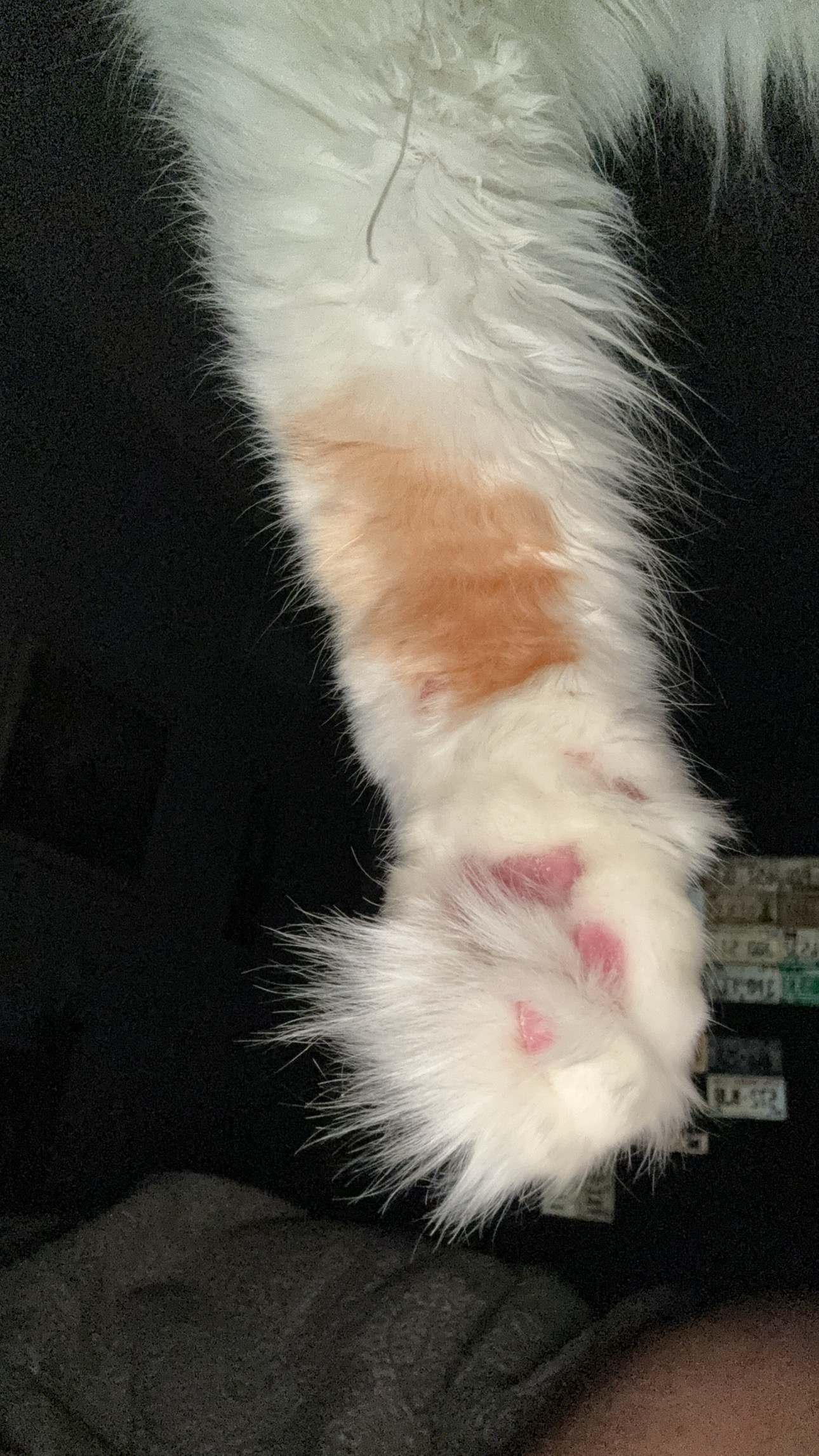
Paw — note the tufts of fur between the digits.

While some registries recognise solid white specimens as Turkish Vans, most do not. The US-based CFA (the world's largest registry of pedigreed cats) and Fédération Internationale Féline (FIFe, the largest international cat fancier organisation) recognise only Van-patterned specimens, as they define the breed by both its type and pattern. The Germany-based but international World Cat Federation (WCF) and British GCCF consider the solid white specimens a separate breed, called the Turkish Vankedisi in the WCF and Turkish Van Kedisi in GCCF, names that are easily confused with the solid white landrace Van cat from Turkey, which is called Van kedisi (two words) in Turkish. In other registries, the solid white cats are not considered show quality and are therefore actively bred against. They are prone to deafness; this is a common defect with many solid white animals, and negative BAER-test results are mandatory for registration in some registries.

=== Behaviour ===
The TICA standard notes several characteristics, including their high intelligence, energy and playfulness – also making them somewhat mischievous. Muscular and highly driven, they like to climb and perch high up, to study their environment, and they get around their domain with impressive athleticism. They make quite successful hunters as a consequence. Their drive makes them easily trainable with positive reinforcement – to play fetch, do tricks or walk on a leash. Although there may be efforts to move the breed towards greater sociability. A 2021 study in Finland did find that the Turkish Vans in their research showed higher than average tendencies towards fearfulness, aggression towards humans, as well as a lower stress tolerance (notable excessive grooming and litter-box problems), and lower sociability to humans and cats.

Curious, Turkish Vans want to be with their owner participating in whatever is happening, and so they may follow a person from room to room. While Turkish Vans are affectionate towards their family members, they are not normally lap cats. They may lie next to their owners and will happily allow themselves to be petted, but this is not a breed that tolerates being picked up and often wants to be near their owner, not on their owner.

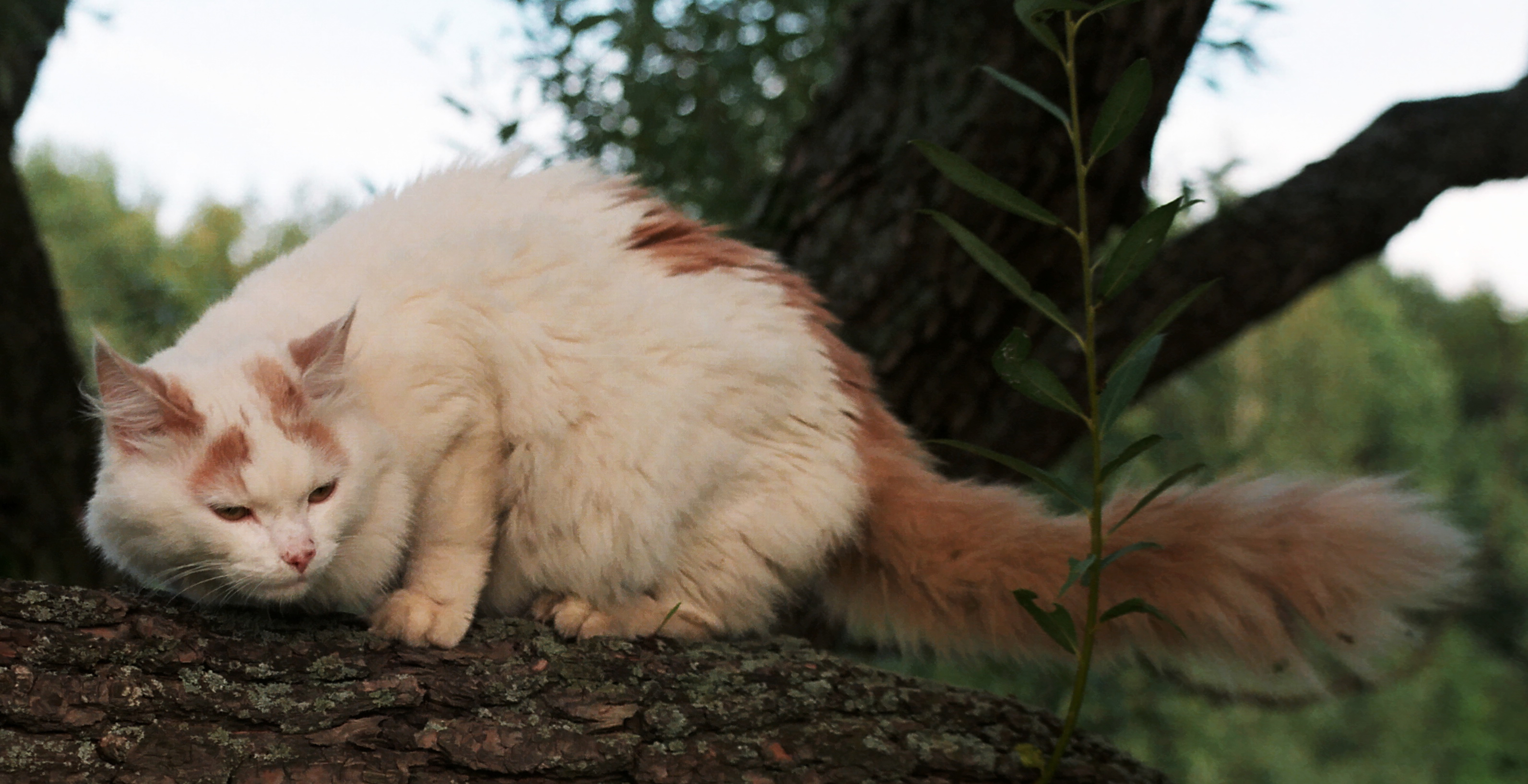
Turkish Van cats may have random, roughly coin-sized spots over their body, but not as large as on their head and tail.

When it comes to families, Turkish Vans are happy to play with children, but care must be taken to make sure small ones are reminded that the breed may not enjoy being held, and may strike out if forced into such a situation. The native Van cats of Turkey have been nicknamed the "swimming cats", due to an unusual fascination with water. Despite the modern Turkish Van breed consisting almost entirely of pedigreed, indoor-only cats with no access to large bodies of water, and despite dubious connections between them and the cats of the Lake Van area, some feel that the Turkish Van has a notable affinity for water; for example, instead of swimming in a lake, they may stir their water bowls or play with water in the toilet, and some may even follow their owners into water. However, the idea that the breed likes water more than other cats may be mistaken according to some pet writers.

== Genetics ==
Van pattern white spotting diagram degree (8–9) has coloured tail and head spots

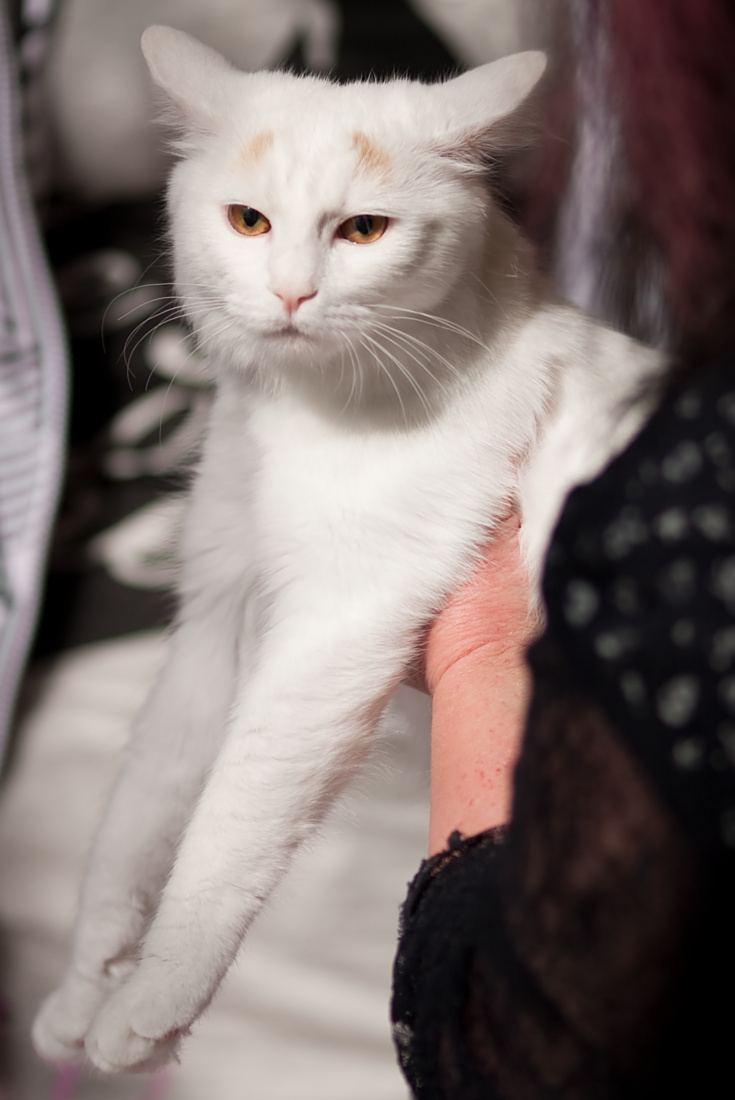
Red tabby male with a high degree white spotting and orange eyes

The white spotting gene ("piebald"; partial leucism) appears in other different species (like the horse and the ball python). It also shows up in other breeds of cat, since the Van pattern is merely an extreme expression of the gene.

The breed's variability of eye colour is genetically caused by the white spotting factor, which is a characteristic of this breed. The white spotting factor is the variable expression of the white spotting gene that varies from the minimal degree (1), as in the blue-eyed cats with white tip on the tail to the maximal degree (8–9) that results in a Van-patterned cat, when coloured marks occupy at most 20% of the white background, but the white background in the breed covers about 80% of the body. Breeding two cats together with the same level of white spotting will produce cats with a similar degree of spotting.

== Health ==
Van-patterned Turkish Vans are not prone to deafness, because their phenotype is associated with the Van pattern (S^{v}) semi-dominant gene. Solid-white Turkish Angoras carry the epistatic (masking) white colour (W) dominant gene associated with white fur, blue eyes, and often deafness. Solid white cats of Turkish Van stock may share this gene. All three types of cat may exhibit eye colours that are orange, blue or odd (one orange and one blue eye). Deafness is principally associated with white cats having two blue eyes.

== See also ==
- Cat coat genetics
- Piebald
