= Clouded tiger =

Clouded tiger may refer to:

- Clouded leopard, Neofelis nebulosa
- Marbled cat, Pardofelis marmorata
- Calico cat, a domestic cat of any breed with a tri-color coat
- Tortoiseshell cat, a domestic cat coat coloring named for its similarity to tortoiseshell material
