= Ojos Azules =

Breed of cat

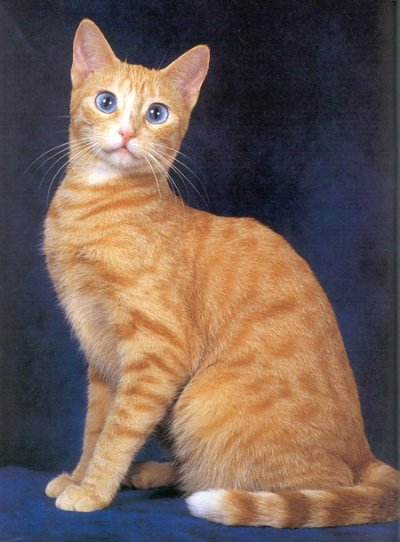
- Red broken mackerel tabby Ojos Azules cat
- Common nicknames: Ojos
- Origin: United States
- Foundation bloodstock: Feral cat population
- Variety status: Extinct. Not recognized as a standardized breed by any major breed registry.

Breed standards
- TICA: historical standard

Ojos Azules (Spanish: [ˈoxos aθˈules], 'Blue Eyes') was a breed of shorthaired domestic cat originating in the USA, with unusual blue or odd eyes caused by a dominant blue eye (DBE) genetic mutation. The breed came in all coat colors; however, only particolors (bicolors and tricolors), colorpoints, and intermediate colors with a characteristic white tail tip were permitted. The breed also had a semi-longhaired coat variety, the Ojos Azules Longhair. Due to the lethal side effects of the Ojos Azules gene, breeders stopped working with this blue eye mutation and the breed became officially extinct.

== History ==
In the 1980s cats with dark blue eyes were discovered among feral cat populations in New Mexico, USA. The first cat with the characteristic, discovered in 1984, was a tortoiseshell named Cornflower. She was bred to males without the trait, which proved to be dominant, as all her kittens showed it. The breed was founded and named Ojos Azules, Spanish for 'Blue Eyes'.

== Breed registration ==
=== Registration and popularity ===
Ojos Azules have always been a very rare breed. In 1992, only ten cats were known. The breed, in both short and long hair variety, was accepted for registration by TICA in 1991. The TICA Ojos Azules Breed Group Standard is dated 5 January 2004. Only cats descending from the original foundation female Cornflower and expressing the deep blue eye gene have been called Ojos Azules.

=== Extinction ===
It was discovered that cranial defects may be linked to the gene, and breeding was temporarily suspended. Eventually, breeders stopped working with cats bearing this blue eye mutation and the breed became officially extinct.

Although the Ojos Azules is considered extinct, and was returned to registration-only status by TICA in 2014, some descendants of Solveig Pflueger's breeding program were still bred by Sherri Mcconnell at that time; these may have been the last true Ojos Azules. As of 2026, Mcconnell breeds Munchkin cats instead and is a chair member of the TICA Munchkin Breed Committee. No other breeding programmes of Ojos Azules descendants are known.

== Characteristics ==
=== Appearance ===
The medium-sized Ojos Azules was known for its bluish eyes, which were large and round. The neck was arched. The tail was proportionate to the cat's body. The head was somewhat triangular in inscribe. It had a slightly rounded forehead and an angular muzzle. The nose had a slight break. The coat was short, fine, soft, silky, and shiny. The undercoat was not particularly developed, but most were dense in color. All colors were allowed. However, only particolors (bicolors and tricolors), colorpoints, and intermediate colors with a white tail tip were permitted. White markings were common on most extremities (tip of the tail, muzzle, and paws). However, belly spots or chest spots were not acceptable and were considered faults. Solid white coats were not desirable, as they could only be distinguished from common white blue-eyed cats with genetic tests. Solid white blue-eyed Ojos Azules were susceptible to deafness, as is common in white blue-eyed cats without the mutation.

== Ojos Azules gene ==
Ojos Azules were remarkable for their deep blue eyes. The color is described as having a greater depth than that seen in Siamese cats. However, many show cats (Siamese, blue-eyed whites) have equally deep blue eyes. The depth of color is due to polygenetic variations.

Unlike the blue eyes linked to solid white, bicolor, and colorpoint genes, which typically suppress pigmentation, the Ojos Azules gene is not linked to any specific fur color or pattern, allowing for cats with dark coats and blue eyes. The eye color is due to the same physical phenomenon seen in other blue-eyed breeds, the absence of melanin in the iris. The mutation is not associated with strabismus (crossed eyes) or deafness, though light sensitivity and pupil contraction issues have been observed in heterozygous individuals. A flattened, white tail-tip is a common indicator of the gene.

Genetic investigation by Solveig Pflueger revealed that the gene is lethal when homozygous, causing cranial deformities, white fur, a small curled tail, and stillbirth. These lethal mutations do not manifest in heterozygous cats. Breeders crossed blue-eyed cats with non-blue-eyed cats to produce litters of approximately 50% blue-eyed kittens.

== Revival of dominant blue eyed breeds ==
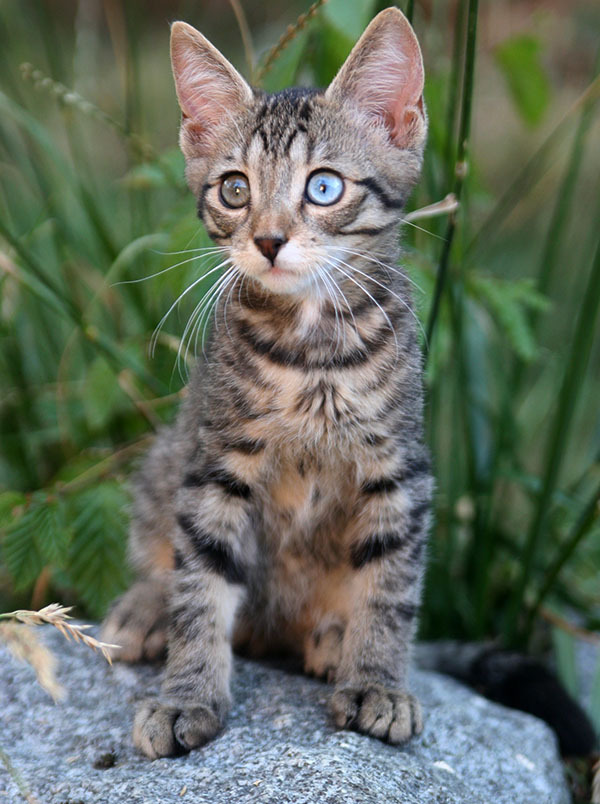
Modern dominant blue-eyed black tabby kitten of the Celestial experimental breed, which is approved by Livre officiel des origines félines (LOOF)

Besides the Ojos Azules gene, three other DBE genes (PAX3-gene variants linked to the phenotype) have also been identified in cats worldwide. Cats carrying these mutations were discovered among random-bred domestic cats in Kazakhstan and Russia, and have since formed the basis of the developing Altai, Topaz, and Celestial breeds, and have been recognised by some registries as eye-colour variants within existing breeds. These cats are not considered Ojos Azules, however, because that breed is defined by descent from the foundation cat Cornflower.
