= Congenital sensorineural deafness in cats =

High rates of congenital deafness in white cats

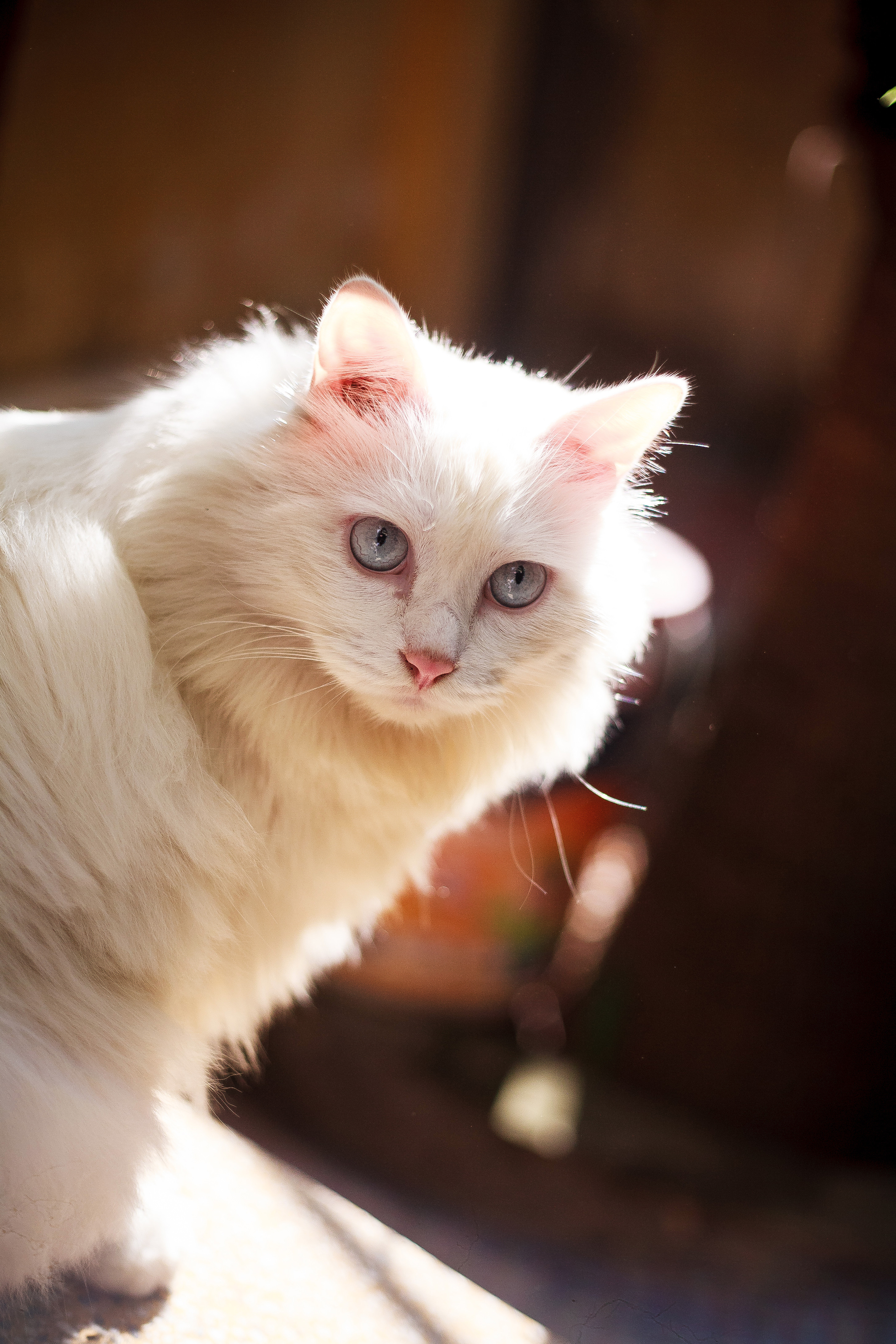
- A completely deaf, solid white, blue-eyed cat
- Specialty: Veterinary medicine
- Symptoms: Congenital hearing loss
- Usual onset: Congenital
- Causes: Genetic factors associated with white pigmentation
- Diagnostic method: Brainstem auditory evoked response (BAER) testing
- Differential diagnosis: Acquired hearing loss

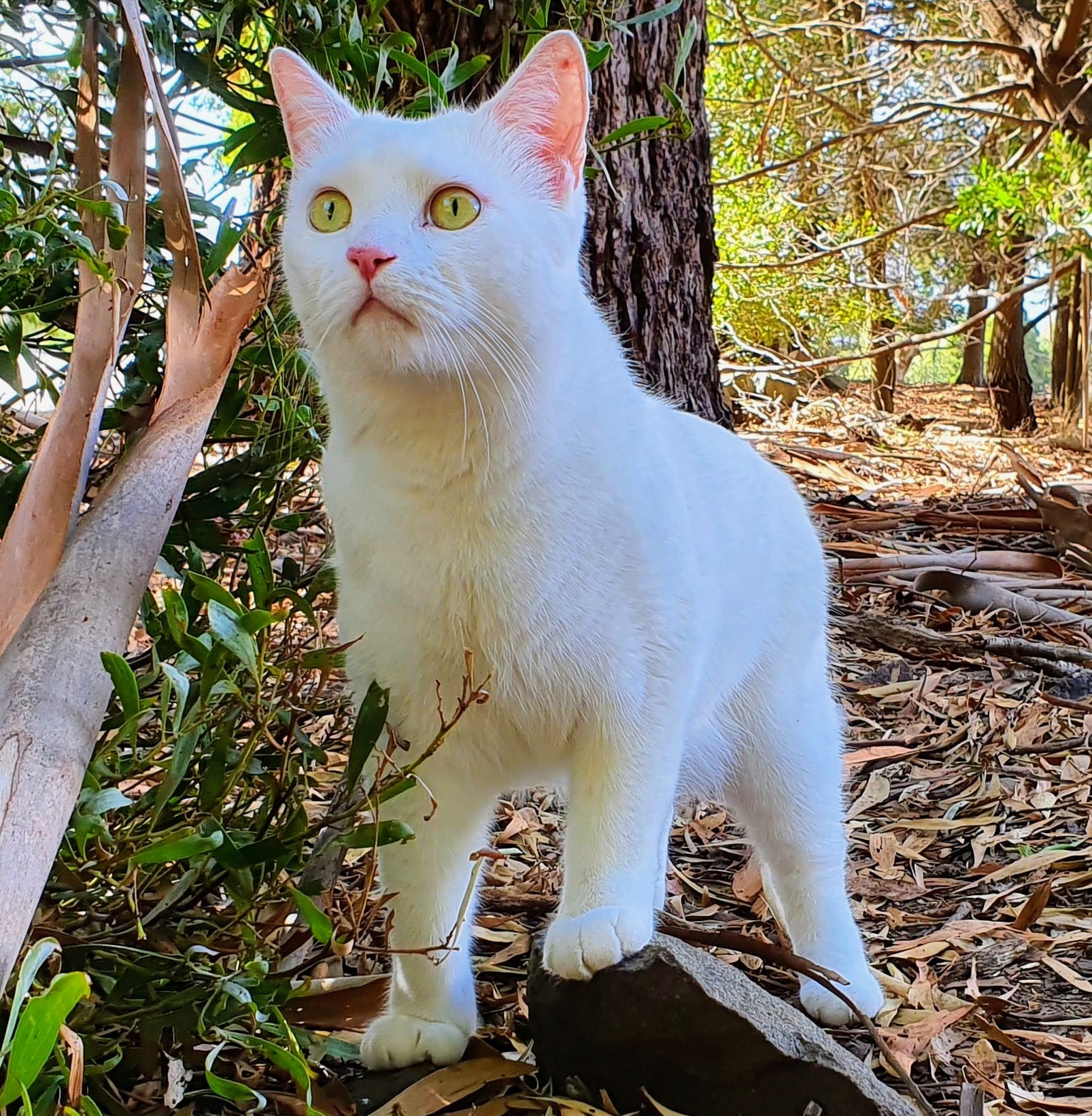
A deaf white cat with yellow eyes

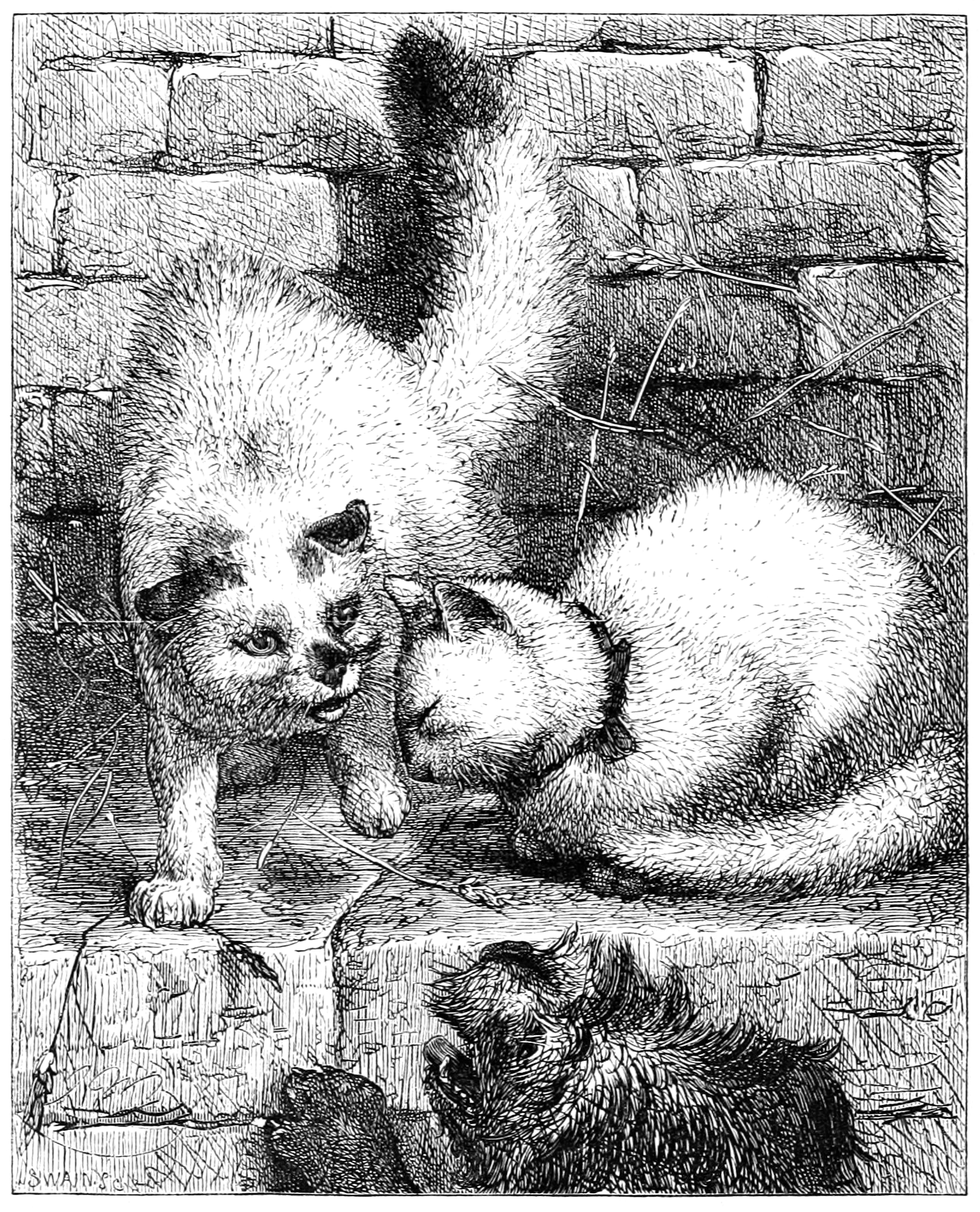
This engraving depicts two cats on a wall with a dog barking below them. The spotted cat hisses at the dog while the deaf white cat dozes, unaware of the barking.

Congenital sensorineural deafness occurs commonly in domestic cats with a white coat. It is a congenital deafness caused by a degeneration of the inner ear. Deafness is far more common in white cats than in those with other coat colours.

== Occurrence ==
Domesticated cats with blue eyes and white coats are often completely deaf. Charles Darwin mentions this phenomenon in his book, On the Origin of Species, to explain correlated variation. Deafness can occur in white cats with yellow, green or blue irises, although it is mostly likely in white cats with blue irises. In white cats with one blue eye and one eye of a different color (odd-eyed cats), deafness is more likely to affect the ear on the blue-eyed side. Approximately 50% of white cats have one or two blue eyes.

According to the ASPCA Complete Guide to Cats, "17 to 20 percent of white cats with non-blue eyes are deaf; 40 percent of "odd-eyed" white cats with one blue eye are deaf; and 65 to 85 percent of blue-eyed white cats are deaf."

In one 1997 study of white cats, 72% of the animals were found to be totally deaf. The entire organ of Corti in the cochlea was found to have degenerated in the first few weeks after birth; however, even during these weeks no brainstem responses could be evoked by auditory stimuli, suggesting that these animals had never experienced any auditory sensations. It was found that some months after the organ of Corti had degenerated, the spiral ganglion of the cochlea also began to degenerate.

Brainstem Auditory Evoked Response (BAER) testing is the standard objective method for assessing hearing in cats. The test measures electrical responses in the auditory pathways following sound stimulation and can identify unilateral and bilateral hearing loss. Behavioural assessments are less reliable because they are subjective and may fail to detect deafness affecting only one ear.

=== Prevalence ===
Studies have reported varying prevalence rates of congenital sensorineural deafness among white cats. A 2019 study of 193 client-owned purebred kittens in the United Kingdom found deafness in 30.3% of the 132 solid-white kittens examined. Of these, 15.9% had bilateral deafness and 14.4% had unilateral deafness. No cases were identified among the 61 coloured kittens included in the study. The prevalence was higher among white kittens with blue irises, affecting 50% of those with two blue irises and 44.4% of those with one blue iris, compared with 22.2% of kittens without blue irises.

A 2022 study examining 72 client-owned purebred white cats in Poland reported a prevalence of 16.7%, with unilateral deafness identified in 11.1% of the cats and bilateral deafness in 5.6%. Unlike some earlier findings, the researchers found no statistically significant association between blue iris colour and deafness in their study population. They also found no significant association between the condition and any particular breed, although the relatively small sample size limited the assessment of breed-specific differences.

== Genetics ==
Although few studies have been done to link this to genes known to be involved in human Waardenburg syndrome, a syndrome of hearing loss and depigmentation caused by a genetic disruption to neural crest cell development, such a disruption would lead to this presentation in cats as well. Waardenburg syndrome type 2A (caused by a mutation in MITF) has been found in many other small mammals including dogs, minks and mice, and they all display at least patchy white depigmentation and some degeneration of the cochlea and saccule, as in deaf white cats.

A major gene that causes a cat to have a white coat is a dominant masking gene, an allele of KIT which suppresses pigmentation and hearing. The cat would have an underlying coat colour and pattern, but when the dominant white gene is present, that pattern will not be expressed, and the cat will be deaf. A cat that is homozygous (WW) or heterozygous (Ww) for this gene will have a white coat despite the underlying pattern/colour. A cat that lacks this dominant masking gene (ww) will exhibit a coat colour/pattern. KIT mutations have also led to patchy depigmentation and different coloured irises in humans, and KIT has been found to increase MITF expression, the gene involved in human Waardenburg syndrome type 2A.

=== Non-deaf blue-eyed white cats ===
The established link between deafness and blue eyes is found in the link between deafness, blue eyes, and solid white coats. However, it is a common misconception that all white cats with blue eyes are deaf. It is possible to have a cat with a white coat without this gene as an extreme form of white spotting, though this is rare; some small non-white patch usually remains.

Furthermore, there are multiple genes responsible for blue eyes, and several of these genes are not linked to masking, white coats or deafness, such as the dominant blue eye (DBE) gene carried by Ojos Azules. Another example is a mutation in the TYR gene causing point coloration, a form of partial albinism seen in Siamese cats and related breeds. This form of pigmentation is not associated with deafness. However, Foreign White cats, which combine the Siamese colorpoint genotype with the dominant white allele of the KIT gene, remain susceptible to congenital sensorineural deafness associated with the KIT allele.

== In popular culture ==
- The character Snowkit in the Warriors series book A Dangerous Path has congenital sensorineural deafness. His condition leads to his death as he fails to hear his mother's warning of the appearance of a predator.

== See also ==
- Cat coat genetics
- Merle (dog coat)
- Pleiotropy
- Van cat
- Waardenburg syndrome
