= Odd-eyed cat =

Cat with eyes of different colours

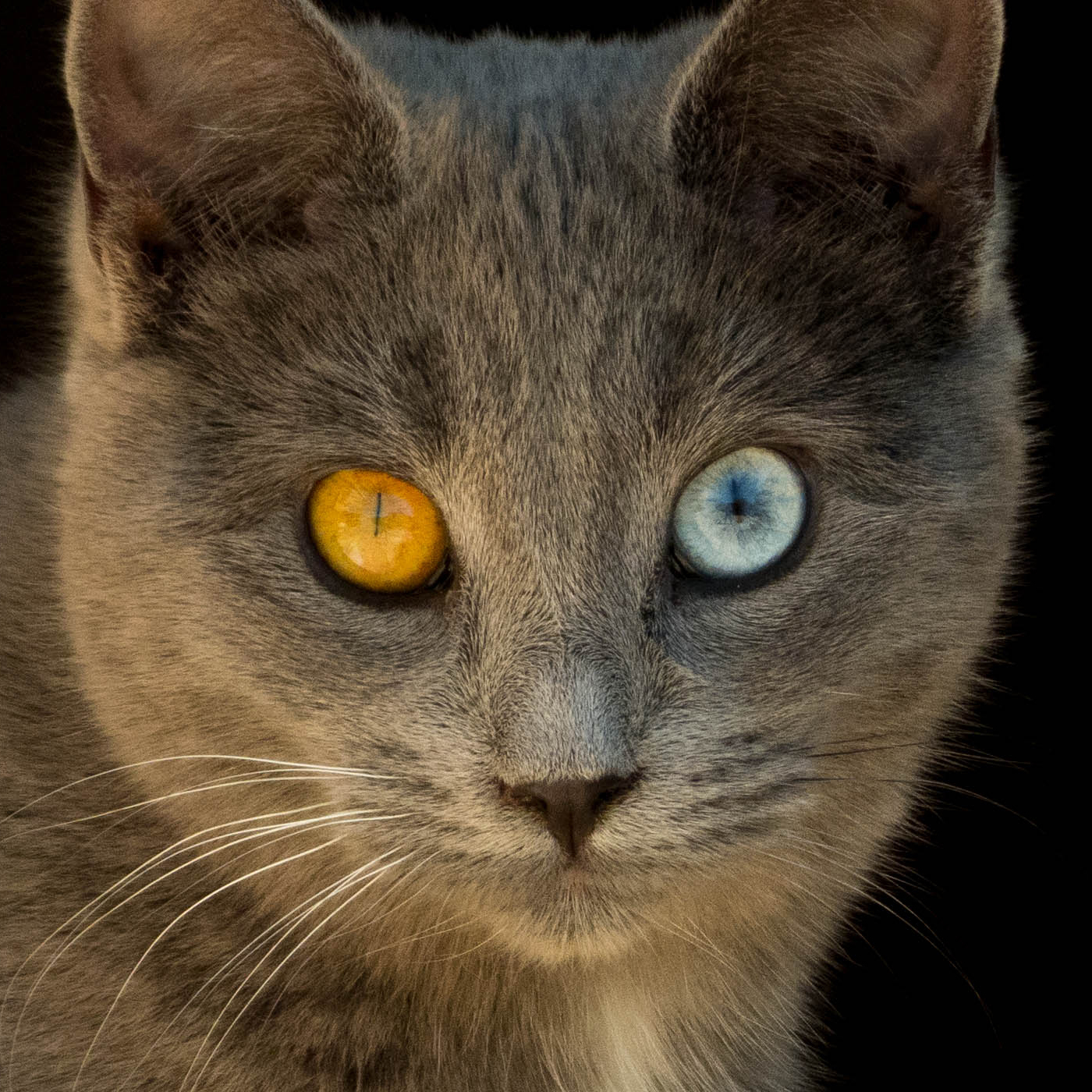
An odd-eyed blue and white cat

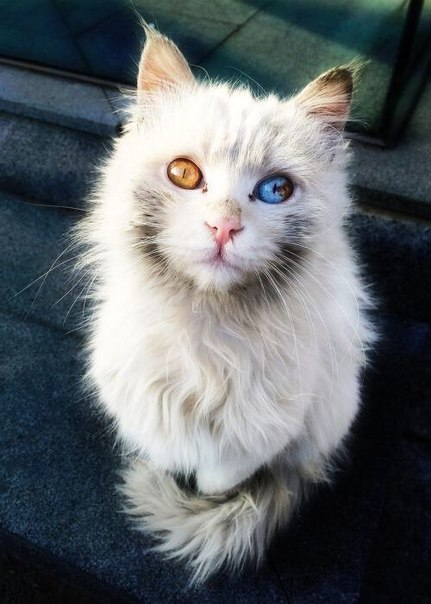
An odd-eyed cat showing complete heterochromia (amber and blue eye) and sectoral heterochromia in the blue eye (partially brown-coloured)

An odd-eyed cat (also known as heterochromic cat) has one blue eye and one eye either green, yellow, amber, or brown. This is a feline form of complete heterochromia, a condition that occurs in some other animals, including humans. There is also sectoral (partial) heterochromia, where two different colours occur within the same iris. The condition most commonly affects solid white cats, but may be found in cats of any coat colour.

== Genetics ==
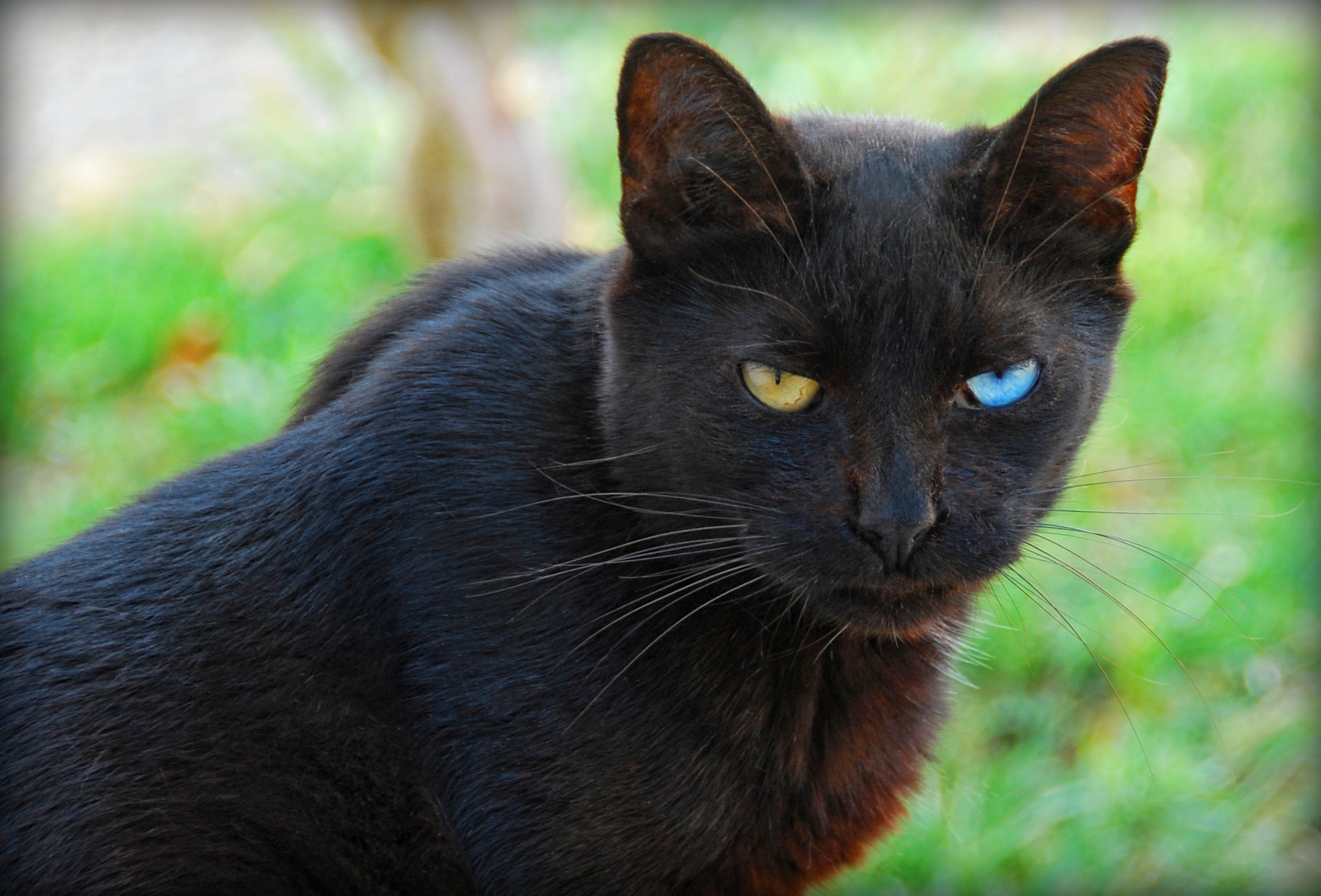
A rare predominantly black cat with odd eyes

The odd-eyed colouring is caused when either the epistatic (recessive) white gene or dominant white (which masks any other colour genes and turns a cat completely solid white) or the white spotting gene (which is the gene responsible for bicolour coats) prevents melanin (pigment) development, resulting in a cat with one blue eye and one green, yellow, amber, or brown eye. Approximately 15–40% of the solid white cats have one or two blue eyes.

The odd-eye condition only rarely occurs in cats that lack both the dominant white and the white spotting gene. These cats carry a dominant blue eye-gene, which is not linked to coat colouration. A famous example of this case is the extinct Ojos Azules cat.

== Cat breeds ==
Odd-eyes are found in all domestic cats, and are not linked to a specific breed. However, odd-eyed cats are popular within several breeds, including Van cat, Turkish Van, Turkish Angora, Sphynx, Persian, Oriental Shorthair, Japanese Bobtail and Khao Manee. In the Japanese Bobtail, odd-eyed cats are most frequently found in calico individuals.

== Kittens ==
As with some other newborn mammals, all cats are blue-eyed as kittens, and may change as the newborn ages. The differences in an odd-eyed kitten's eye colour might not be noticeable, except upon close inspection. Odd-eyed kittens have a different shade of blue in each eye. The colour of the odd eye changes over a period of months, for example, from blue to green to yellow or from green to blue to yellow, until it reaches its final, adult colour.

== Deafness in odd-eyed cats ==
A typical example of an odd-eyed solid white cat

There is a common misconception that all odd-eyed cats are born deaf in one ear. This is not true; however, solid white (completely white) cats with one or two blue eyes do have a higher incidence of genetic deafness, with the white gene occasionally causing the degeneration of the cochlea, beginning a few days after birth. In odd-eyed white cats, the ear on the blue-eyed side may be deaf, while the other ear usually has normal hearing.

The established link between deafness and odd-eyes is found in the link between deafness, blue eyes and solid white coats. There are multiple different genes responsible for blue (incl. odd eyes), and several of these genes are not linked to white coats or deafness (e.g., "Siamese" colourpoint-gene, Ojos Azules-gene, etc.). For example solid white blue-eyed Foreign White or Ojos Azules cats are not linked to deafness. Deafness depends on the cat's genotype (genetic make-up), and not its phenotype (physical appearance). Therefore, not all solid white cats with one or two blue eyes are deaf. It is not advisable to breed from deaf white cats, as this would pass the trait along. BAER-testing (Brainstem Auditory Evoked Response) is used to test deafness in cats.

Scientists estimate that about 10–20% of non-blue-eyed solid white cats of are born deaf, or become deaf as part of the feline aging process, while about 30–40% of the solid white odd-eyed cats are deaf. For solid white cat with two blue eyes, 60–80% are deaf. Cats are classified as deaf, when one or both ears are affected by deafness.

== Eyeshine and red-eye effect ==
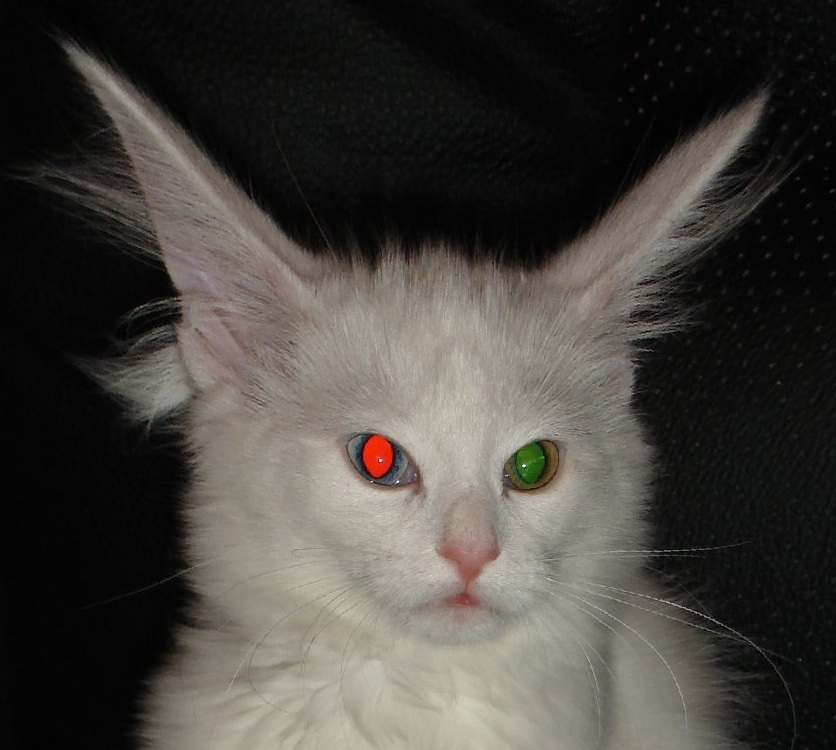
Flash photography red-eye effect in the blue eye, but not in the yellow eye of an odd-eyed cat

In flash photographs, odd-eyed cats typically show a red-eye effect in the blue eye, but not in the other eye. This is due to the combined effect of the (normal) presence of a tapetum lucidum in both eyes and the absence of melanin in the blue eye. The tapetum lucidum produces eyeshine in both eyes, but in the non-blue eye a layer of melanin over the tapetum lucidum selectively removes some colours of light.

== Cultural reactions and folklore ==
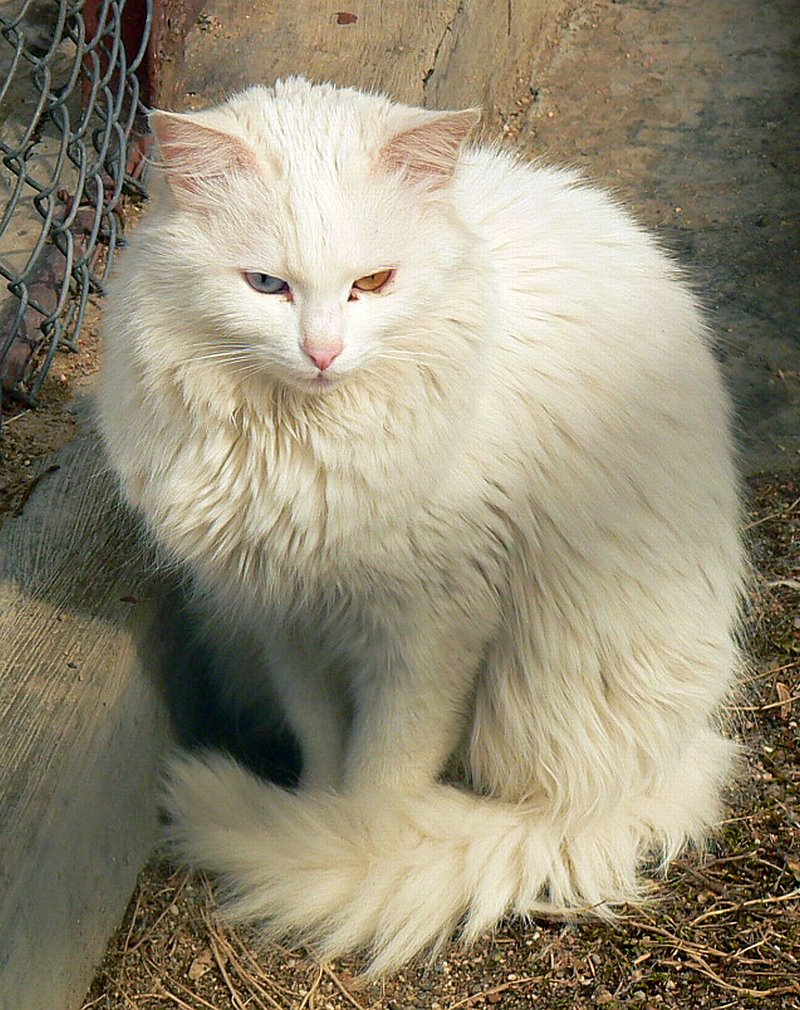
Odd-eyed white Turkish Angora cat with a blue and an amber eye from Ankara Zoo

The Atatürk Forest Farm and Zoo in Ankara has a breeding program to preserve pure solid white Turkish Angora cats. The zoo specifically prized the odd-eyed Angoras, as the Turkish folklore suggests that "the eyes must be as green as the lake and as blue as the sky".

Prophet Muhammad's pet Angora, Muezza, was reputed to be an odd-eyed cat.

The mascot of the 2010 FIBA World Championship, hosted by Turkey, was an anthropomorphised odd-eyed Van cat named "Bascat".

Raymond, an Animal Crossing villager introduced in Animal Crossing: New Horizons, is an anthropomorphic cat with a green left eye and brown right eye.
