= Tortoiseshell cat =

Multi-coloured fur in cats

A black tortoiseshell moggy with a brindled coat

Tortoiseshell is a coat colouration in domestic cats named for its similarity to tortoiseshell pattern. The coats of tortoiseshell cats, or torties for short, are two colours other than white in an asymmetrical distribution, either closely mixed ('brindled') or in larger patches. The two colours always consist of one eumelanistic (black, blue, chocolate, lilac, cinnamon or fawn) and one phaeomelanistic (red or cream) colour. The most common tortoiseshell colouration is black tortoiseshell (black and red). Tortoiseshell can occur in combination with other cat coat patterns, such as tabby and colourpoints. Tortoiseshell cats with the tabby pattern in their eumelanistic colour are tortoiseshell tabby cats, sometimes referred to as torbies.

Like the tricoloured tortoiseshell-and-white or calico (in North American English) cats, tortoiseshell cats are almost exclusively female. Male tortoiseshells are rare and are usually sterile. Tortoiseshell markings appear in many different cat breeds, as well as in non-purebred domestic cats. This pattern is especially preferred in the Japanese Bobtail breed.

== Pigmentation ==
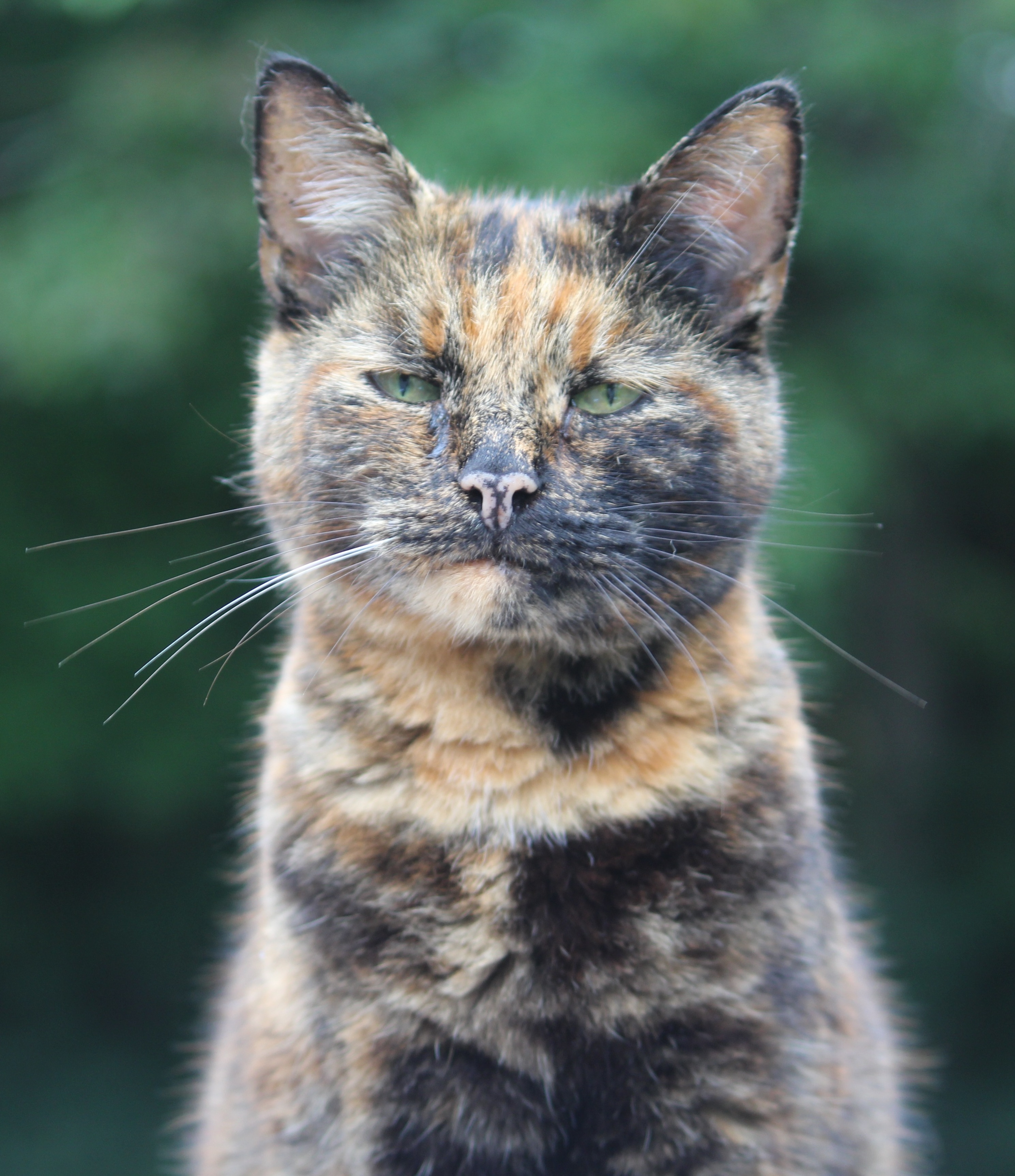
A black tortoiseshell moggy cat

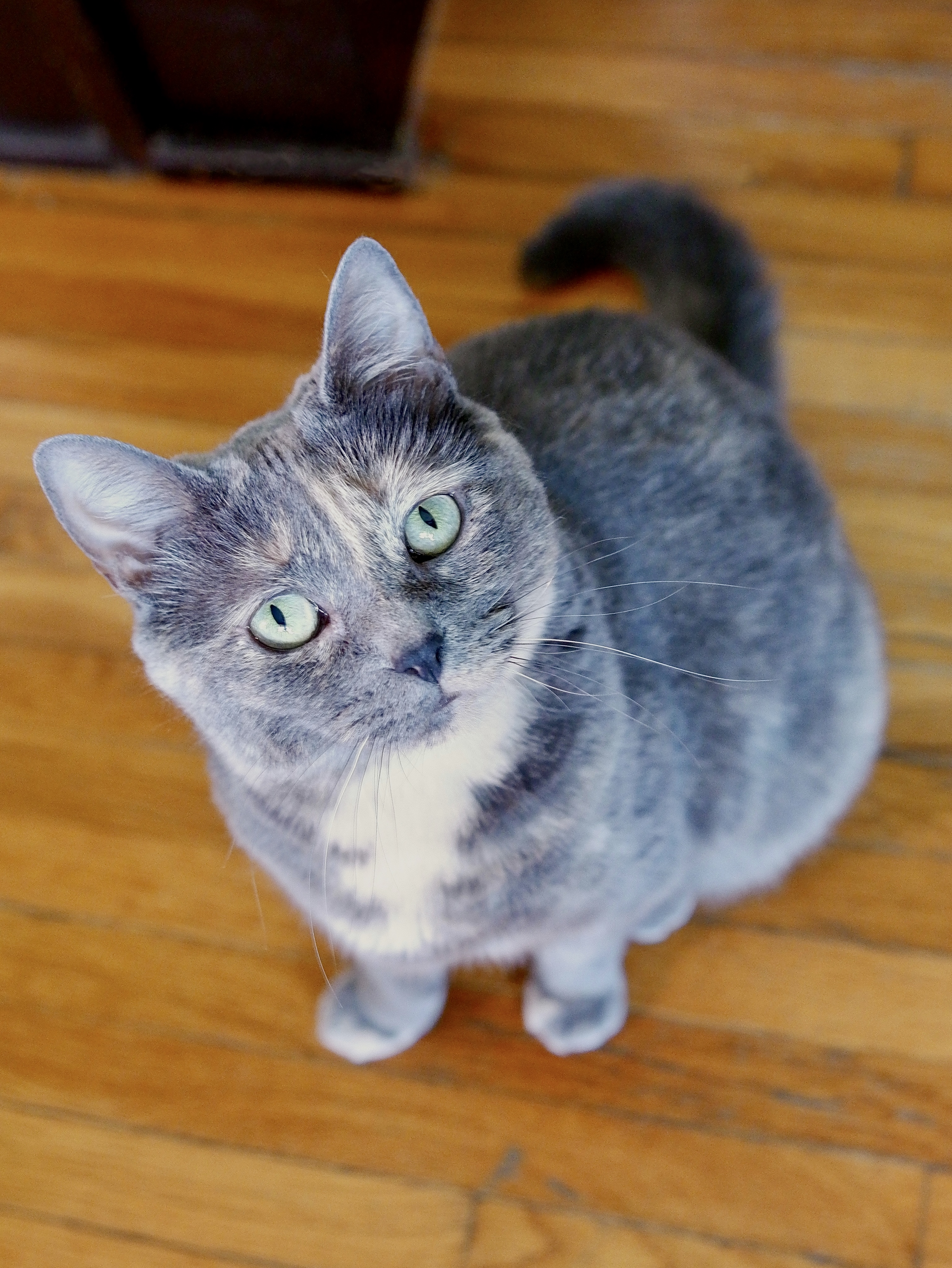
Cat with a blue ("dilute", "grey") tortoiseshell coat

Tortoiseshell coats result from an interaction between genetic, developmental, and environmental factors. Coat colours in domestic cats are produced by the interaction of orange-based phaeomelanin (O) and black-based eumelanin (B) pigments. Tortoiseshell cats are bicoloured and expresses a combination of both next to each other in their coat. The primary gene for cat coat colouration (B) produces the brown-toned colours — black, blue, chocolate, lilac, cinnamon, and fawn. This gene can be masked by the co-dominant gene for the orange colour (O), which produces the orange-toned colours — red and cream. The orange gene is located on the X chromosome and has two alleles: orange (X^{O}) and non-orange (X^{o}), that produce the orange phaeomelanin and black eumelanin pigments, respectively. Typically, the alleles are notated as an uppercase O for orange, or a lowercase o for non-orange.

Pigment colour overview
| Pigment | Allele | | Gene | Basic (D) | Dilution (d) |
|---|---|---|---|---|---|
| phaeomelanin | orange | O | | red | cream |
| eumelanin | non-orange | o | B | black | blue |
| eumelanin | non-orange | o | b | chocolate | lilac |
| eumelanin | non-orange | o | b^{l} | cinnamon | fawn |

The (B) and (O) genes can be further modified by a recessive dilute gene (dd) which softens the basic colours. Red becomes cream, black becomes blue, chocolate becomes lilac, and cinnamon becomes fawn. All tortoiseshells form a combination of either two basic colours — red combined with black, chocolate or cinnamon — or two dilute colours — cream combined with blue, lilac or fawn. Therefore, a tortoiseshell cat may be a chocolate tortoiseshell (chocolate and red) or a blue tortoiseshell (blue and cream) or the like, based on the alleles for the (B) and (D) genes. However, due to genetic dominance, the most common tortoiseshell colouration is black tortoiseshell (black and red). Various terms are colloquially used for specific colours; for example, black is also called "brown", blue is also called "grey", red is also called "orange", "ginger", and "yellow". Even though there exist three dilute tortoiseshell colours, blue is sometimes colloquially referred to as "dilute", which is the most common dilute colouration.

=== Sex linkage ===
Female cats are homogametic (XX) and undergo the phenomenon of X-inactivation, in which one of the X chromosomes is turned off at random in each cell in very early embryonic development. The inactivated X becomes a Barr body. Cells in which the chromosome carrying the orange (O) allele is inactivated express the alternative non-orange (o) allele, determined by the (B) gene. Cells in which the non-orange (o) allele is inactivated express the orange (O) allele. Pigment genes are expressed in melanocytes that migrate to the skin surface later in development. In bicoloured tortoiseshell cats, the melanocytes arrive relatively early, and the two cell types become intermingled; this produces the characteristic brindled appearance consisting of an intimate mixture of orange and black cells, with occasional small diffuse spots of orange and black. Tortoiseshell cats have a combination of orange-based O and black-based o on two XX-chromosomes; labelled as X^{O}X^{o}, indicating O-gene heterozygosity. Orange and black females have homozygous O-genes; labelled as X^{O}X^{O} (orange) and X^{o}X^{o} (black).

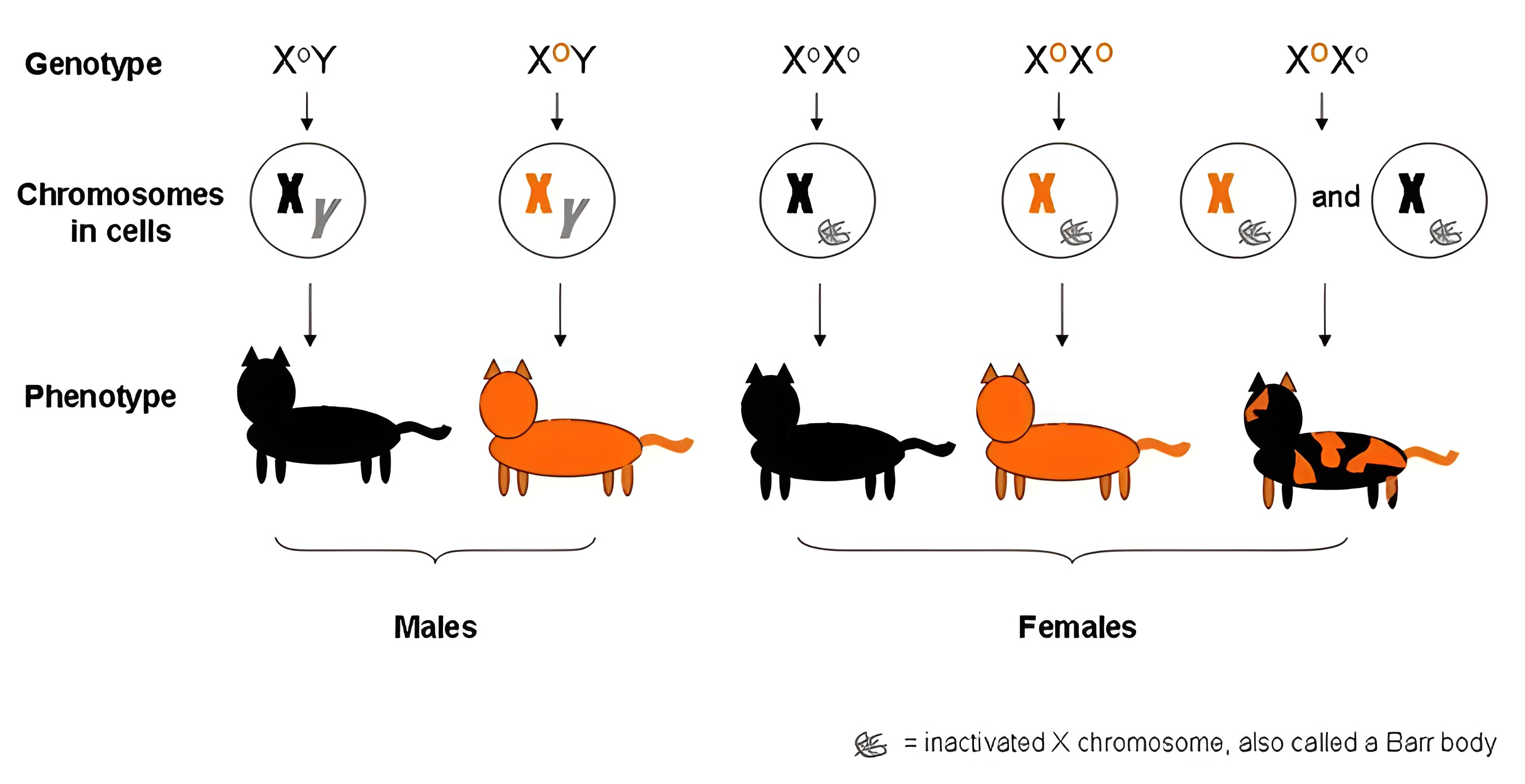
Schematic overview of the sex linkage of the orange (O) and non-orange (o) allele

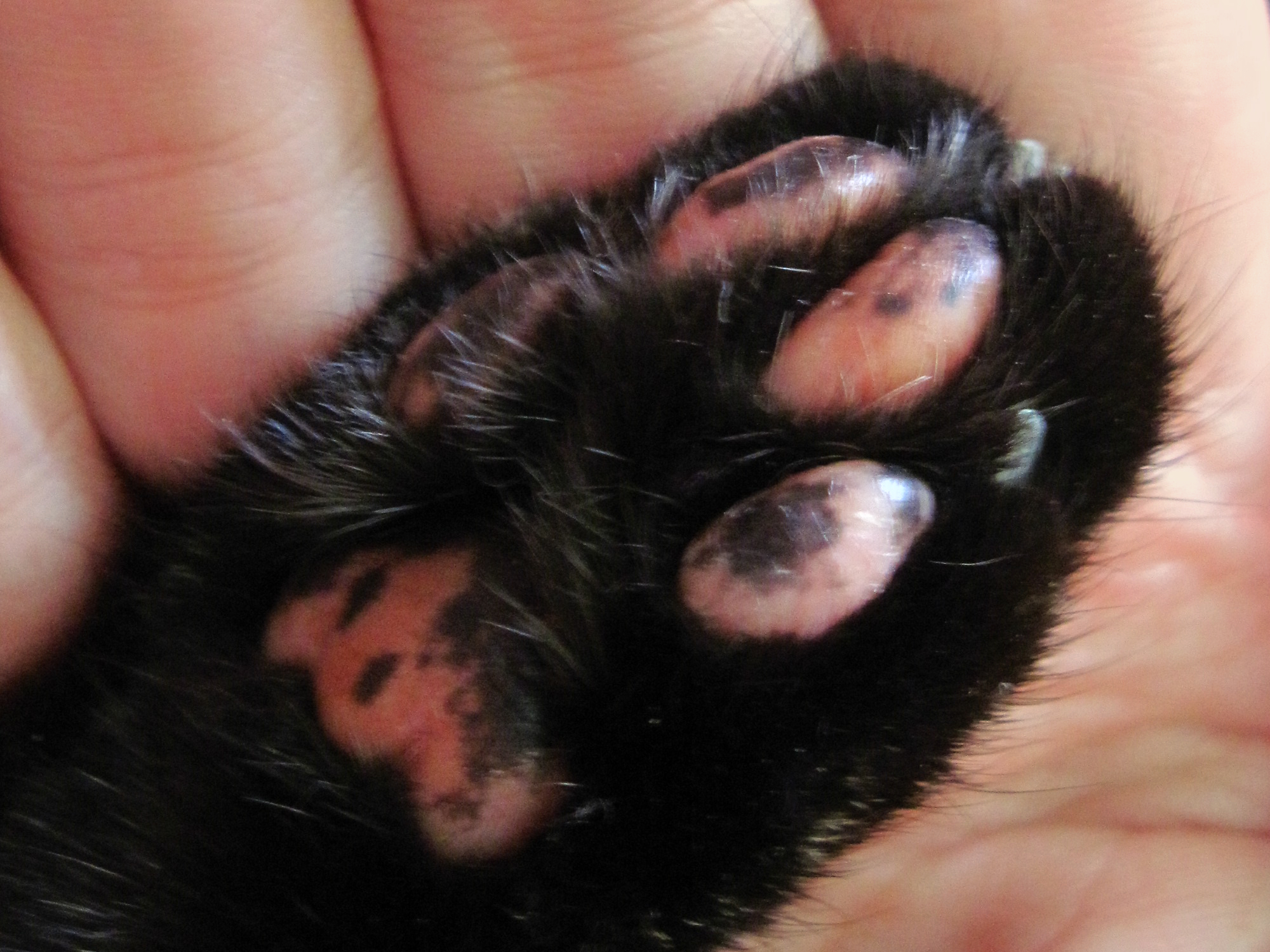
Typical combination of black- and red-based areas on the paw-pads of a tortoiseshell cat, in this case, in a mottling pattern

Male cats, like males of other therian mammals, are heterogametic (XY). The single X chromosome does not undergo X-inactivation, ergo coat colour is determined by which O-gene allele is present. Accordingly, the male cat's coat will be either entirely orange (O; X^{O}Y ) or melanistic black (o; X^{o}Y).

Leonard Doncaster was the first to prove sex linkage of the tortoiseshell coat colouration; i.e. that tortoiseshell is the female heterozygote of orange and black (X^{O}X^{o}) with the corresponding male being orange (X^{O}Y). In the course of his studies he discovered that the rare tortoiseshell male is often sterile.

Very rarely (approximately 1 in 3,000) a male tortoiseshell is born; these typically have an extra X chromosome (XXY), a condition known in humans as Klinefelter syndrome, and their cells undergo an X-inactivation process like in females. As in humans, these cats often are sterile because of the imbalance in sex chromosomes. Some male tortoiseshell cats may be chimaeras, which result from fusion in early development of two (fraternal twin) embryos with different colour genotypes; these torties can pass only one colour to their offspring, not both, according to which of the two original embryos its testes are descended from. Others are mosaics, in which the XXY condition arises after conception and the cat is a mixture of cells with different numbers of X chromosomes.

== Variations ==
=== Colour and distribution ===
Tortoiseshell cats have particoloured coats; either bicoloured with parts of various shades of orange and non-orange pigments, or tricolour in which tortoiseshell is combined with white spotting. The size of the patches can vary from a fine brindled pattern to large patched areas of colour. Typically, the higher degree of white spotting a cat has, the more distinct the different coloured patches are. In general, the markings on tortoiseshell cats are asymmetrically distributed. Dilution genes modify the colouring, lightening the coat colouration from red with either black, chocolate or cinnamon to a mix of cream with either blue, lilac or fawn. These three dilute tortoiseshell colours can be affected by a dilute modifier resulting in apricot mixed with their three caramel variants. Furthermore, the all tortoiseshell colours can occur in combination with the silver inhibitor gene, resulting in their respective silver tabby or smoke versions.

=== Tricolour (tortoiseshell-and-white) ===
Black tortoiseshell cats sporting different pigment distributions

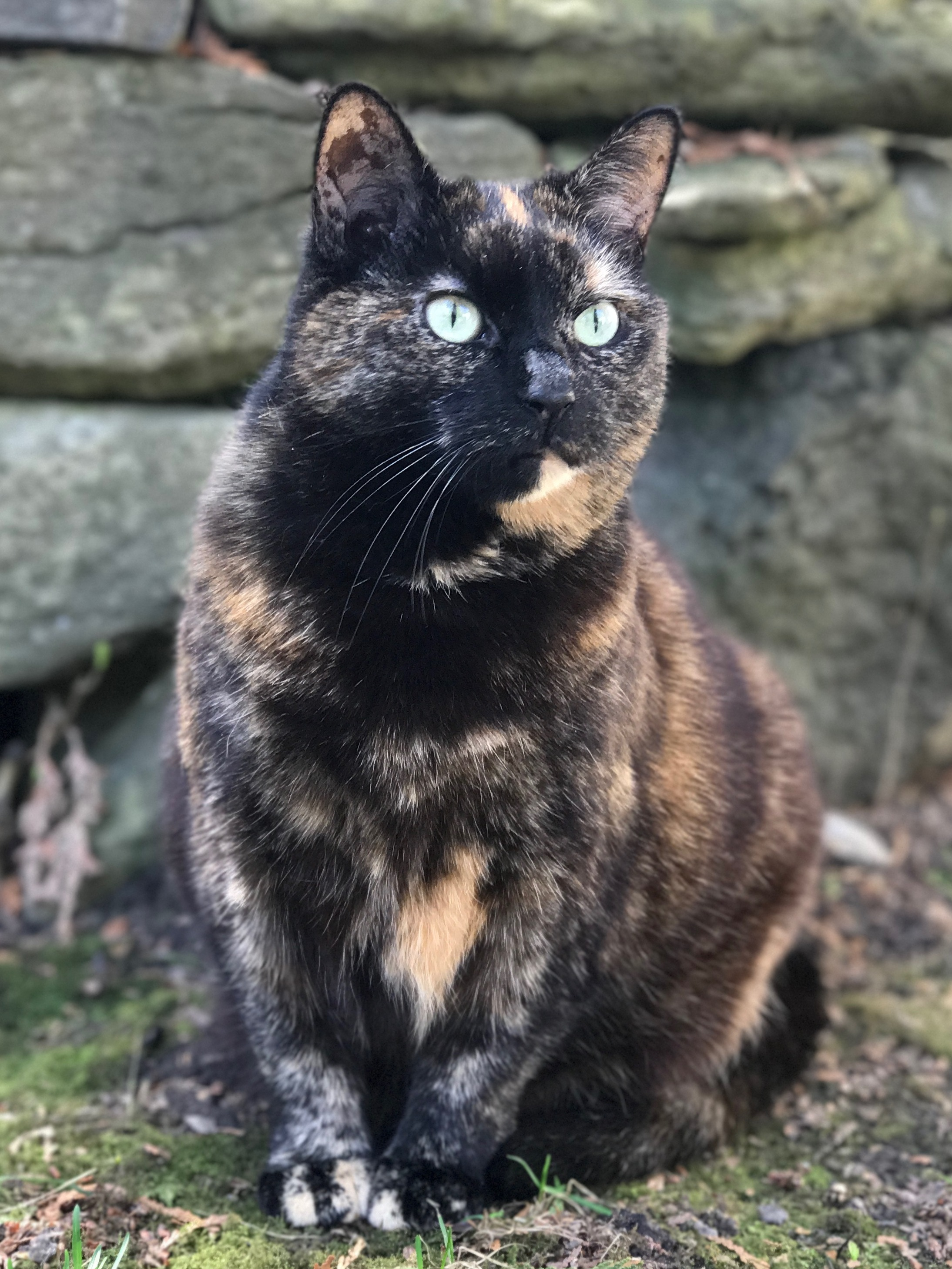
"brindled"

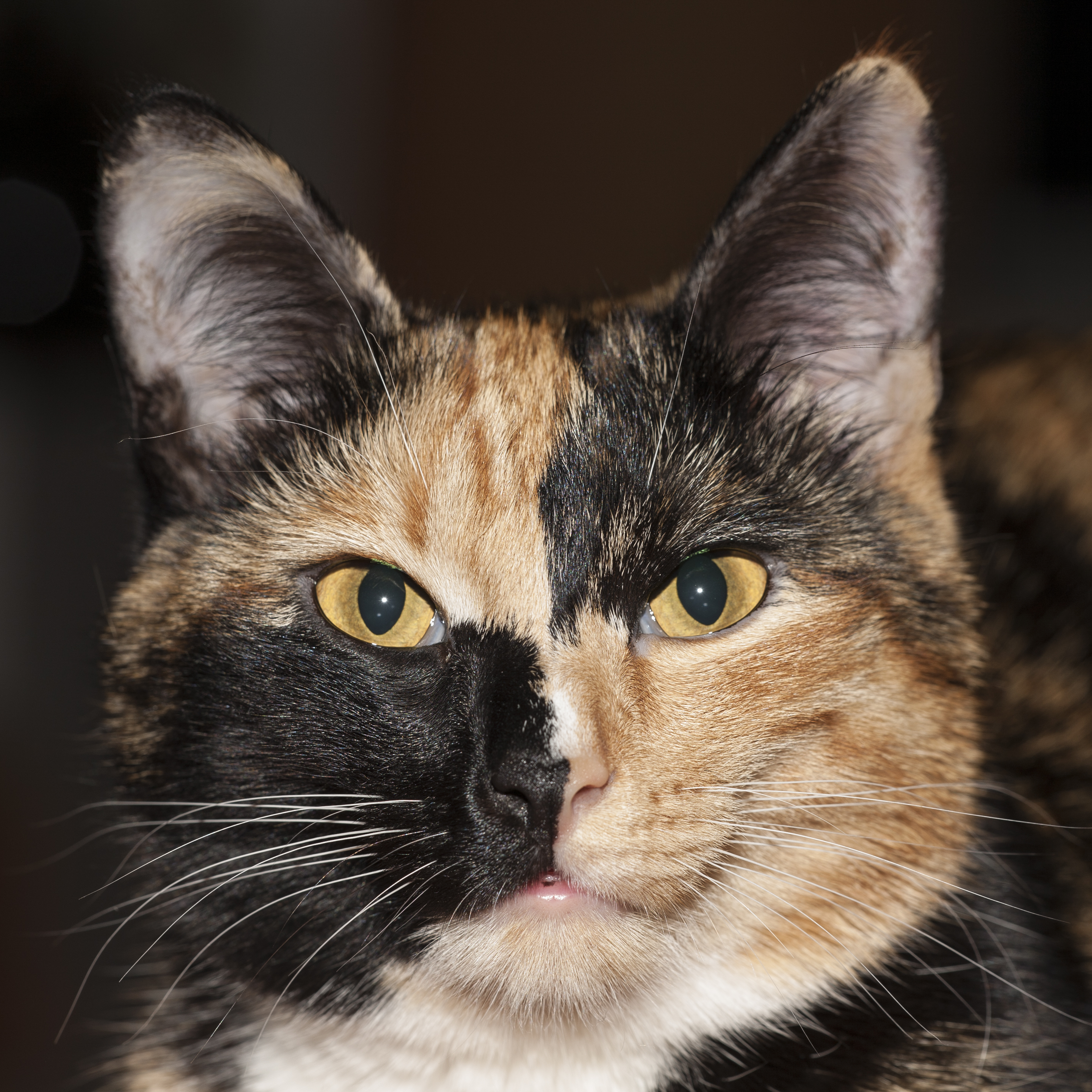
"patched"; In this case, the patches resulted in a double-centrefold face marking resembling a checkerboard pattern. Centrefold markings are often confused with chimaerism; however, in most cases, it is rather a less typical distribution of the tortoiseshell pattern.

In tricolour cats, also known as tortoiseshell-and-white or in North American English as calico, a separate gene interacts developmentally with the tortoiseshell coat colour genes. This white spotting gene produces white, unpigmented patches by delaying the migration of the melanocytes to the skin surface. There are a number of alleles of this gene that produce greater or lesser delays. The amount of white is divided by cat registries into the categories mitted, true bi- or tricolour, harlequin, and van, going from almost no white to almost completely white. In the extreme case, no melanocytes make it to the skin and the cat is entirely white, known as "epistatic" or "dominant white" (genetically different from albinism). In intermediate cases, melanocyte migration is slowed, so that the pigment cells arrive late in development and have less time to intermingle. Observation of tricolour cats will show that, with a little white colour, the orange and black patches become more defined, and with still more white, the patches become completely distinct. Each patch represents a clone of cells derived from one original cell in the early embryo.

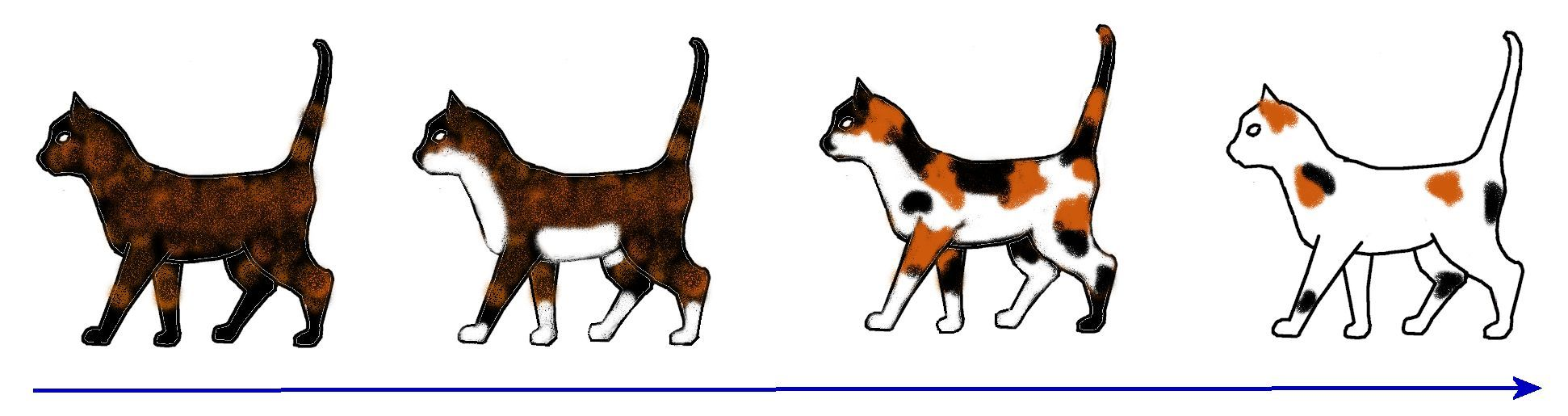
Schematic presentation of how white spotting affects tortoiseshell colour distribution. As the amount of white spotting increases, the tortoiseshell colour becomes less brindled and forms distinct patches of colour. This is related to the migration rates of pigment cells across the surface of the embryo.

=== Pattern ===
Apart from the different colour combinations the tortoiseshell pattern also occurs in combination with other genetic cat coat patterns. The phaeomelanistic red and cream colours will always show a tabby pattern, even if they are genetically "solid" or "self" (meaning non-agouti, i.e. non-tabby). The eumelanistic colour (black, blue, chocolate, lilac, cinnamon, and fawn) makes it possible to visibly determine whether a tortoiseshell cat is tabby or solid. The tortoiseshell tabbies are often called tortie-tabby, or torbie/y for short. In North America the combination of calico and torby, caliby, is used for tortoiseshell tabbies with large white areas. Tortoiseshell colouring can also be expressed in combination with one of the colourpoint restriction patterns, colloquially referred to as a tortie point.

== Folklore ==
In the folklore of several cultures, cats with tortoiseshell colouration are believed to bring good luck. In Ireland, tortoiseshell cats are considered to bring good luck to their owners. In the United States, tortoiseshells are sometimes referred to as money cats. In Japan, tortoiseshell cats are considered to bring good luck against shipwrecks. There are some additional interpretations of the luck of tortoiseshell cats, such as the one in England that describes an announcement of misfortune when a strange tortoiseshell cat enters a house. In England, if a woman dreams of a tortoiseshell cat, it can be interpreted as a warning that she should take care around her so-called friends.

== Behaviour ==
Some studies have found that people believe tortoiseshell cats are more likely to be aggressive and with stronger prey interest—the slang term "tortitude" was coined in reference to this perceived behaviour. There is, however, little existing scientific evidence on the matter. One study found that there was not a relationship between coat colour and tameness. Based on various study results, assumptions cannot be made between cat coat colour and personality or temperament.

== Gallery ==
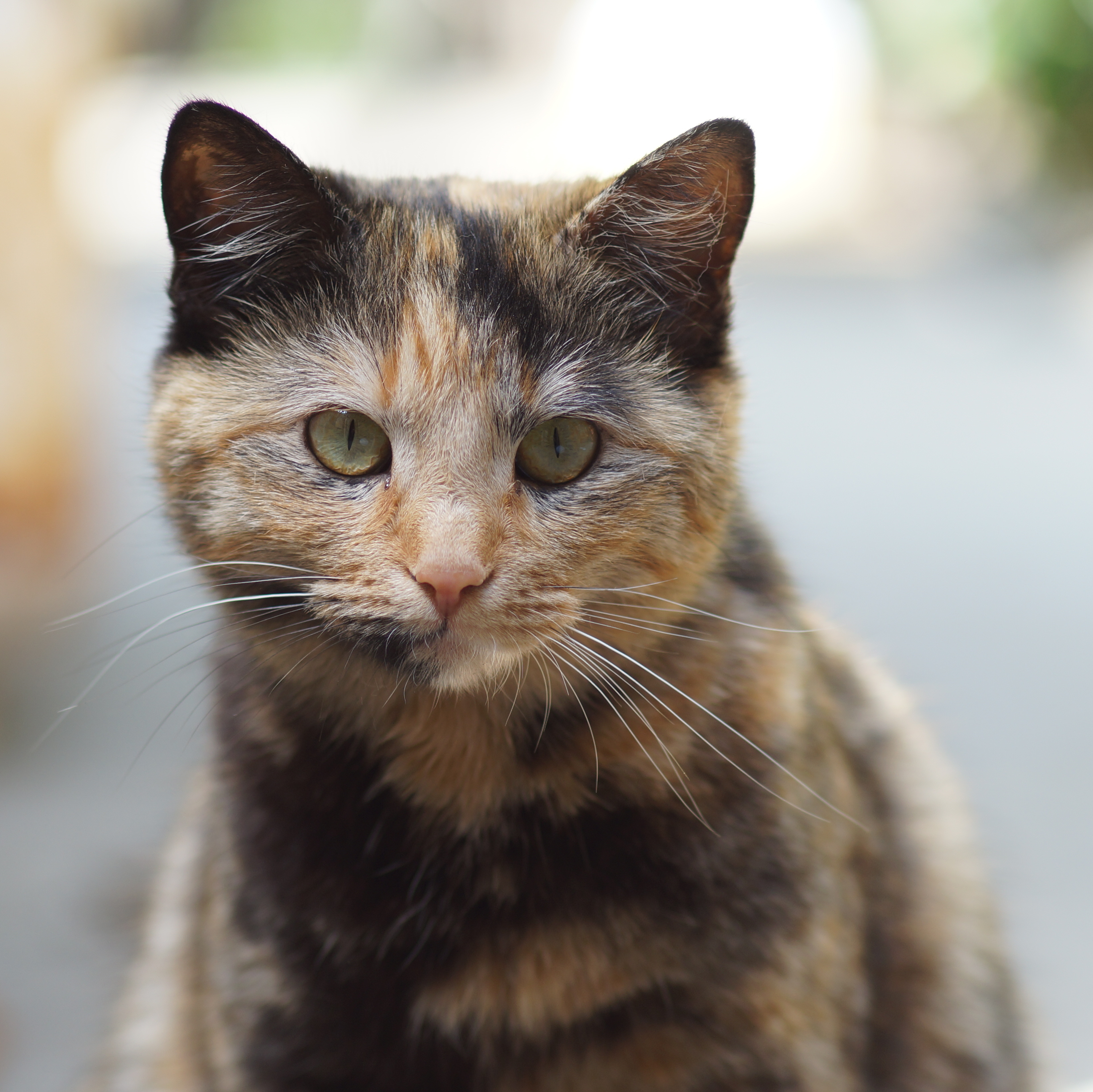
Black tortoiseshell ("tortie")

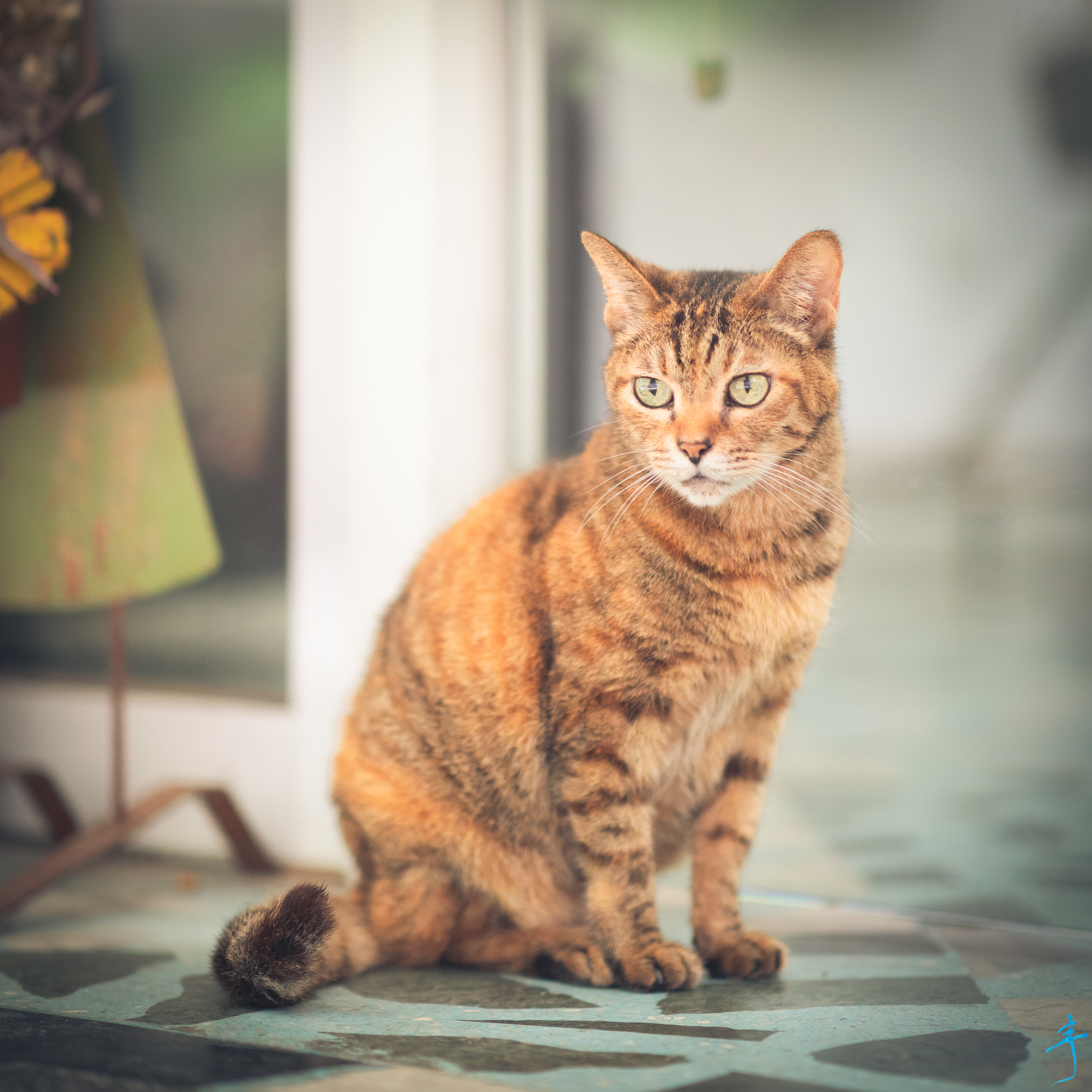
Black tortoiseshell tabby ("torbie/y")

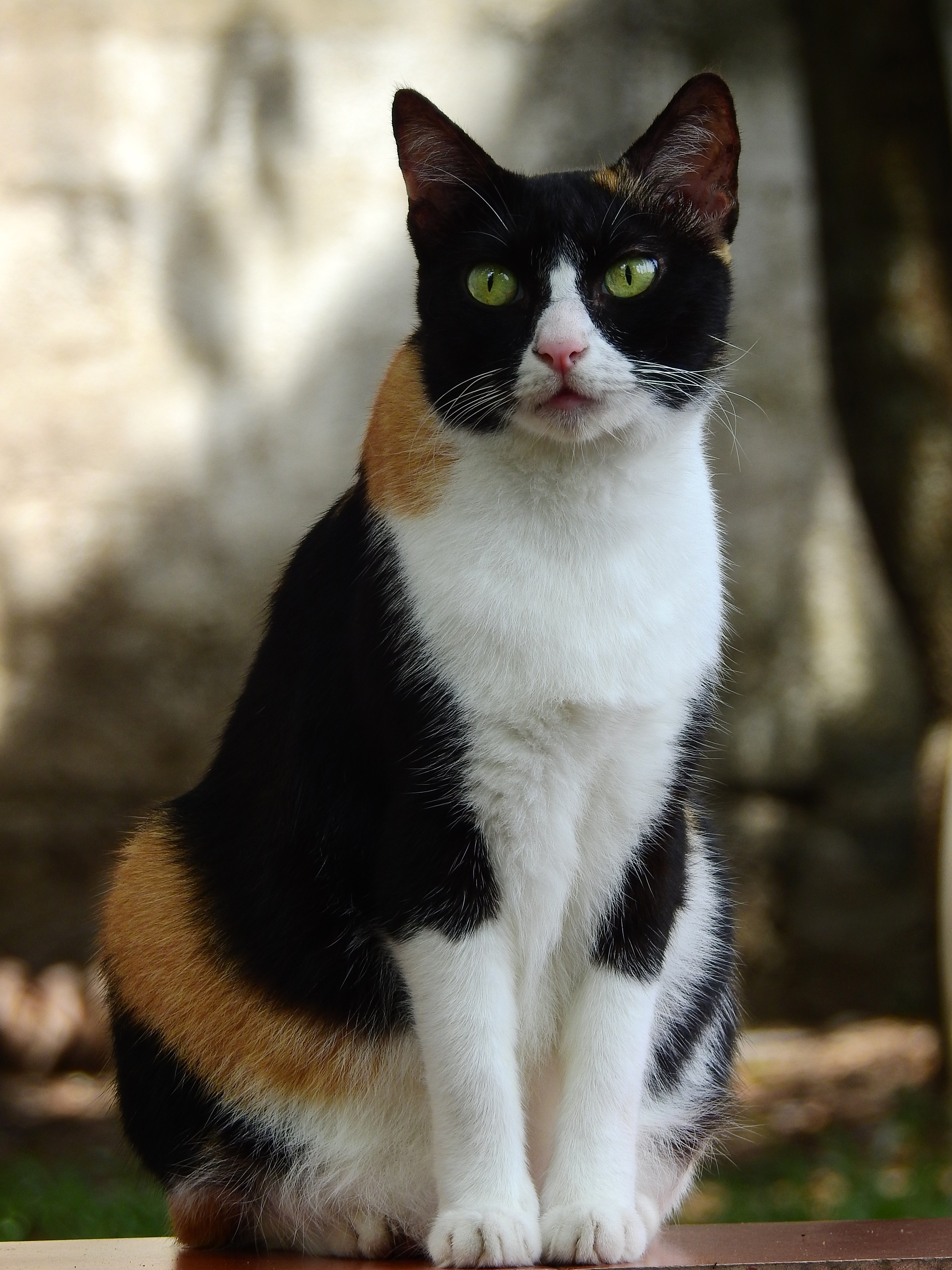
Black tortoiseshell-and-white tricolour ("calico")

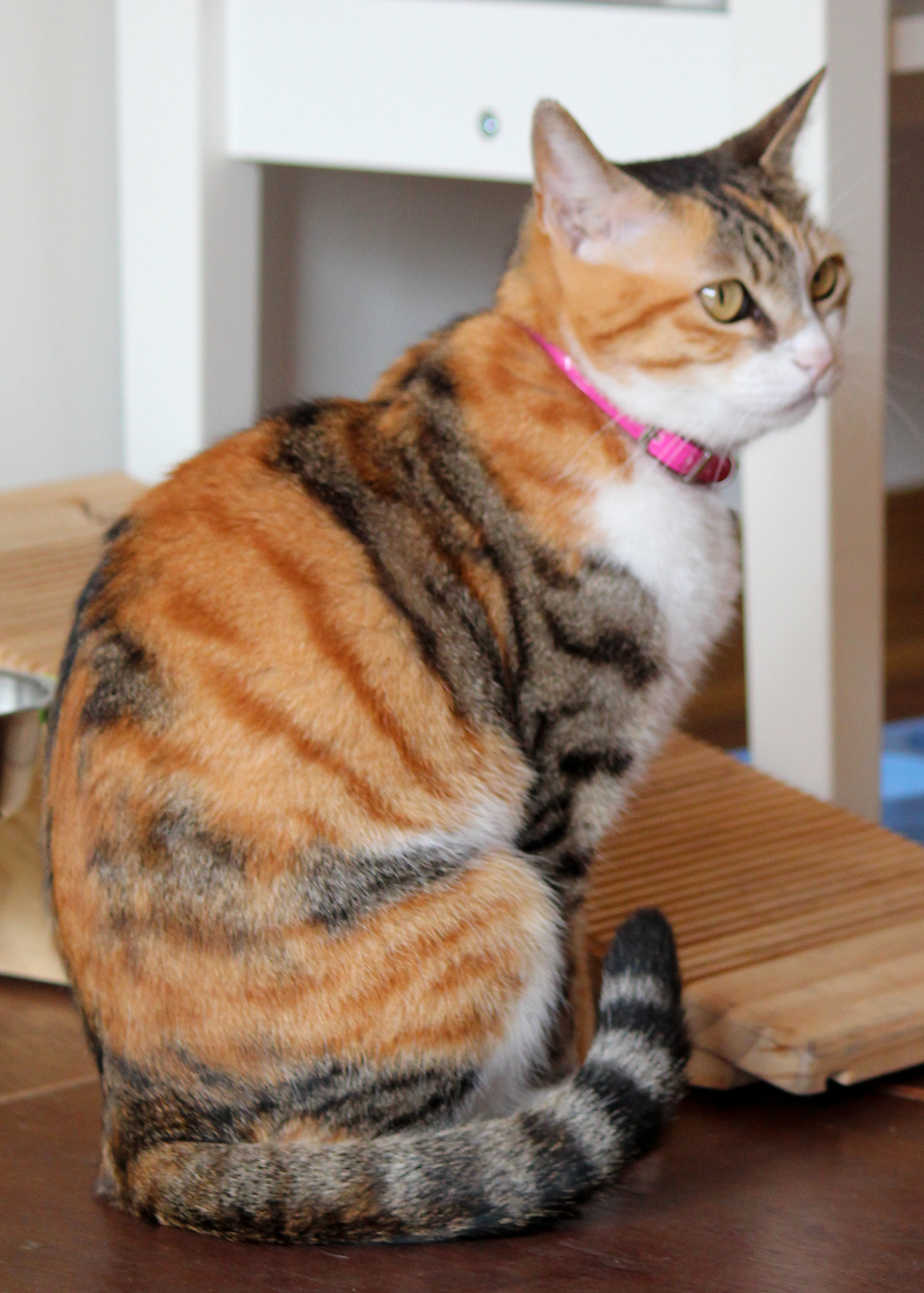
Black tortoiseshell tabby-and-white tricolour ("caliby"/"torbico")

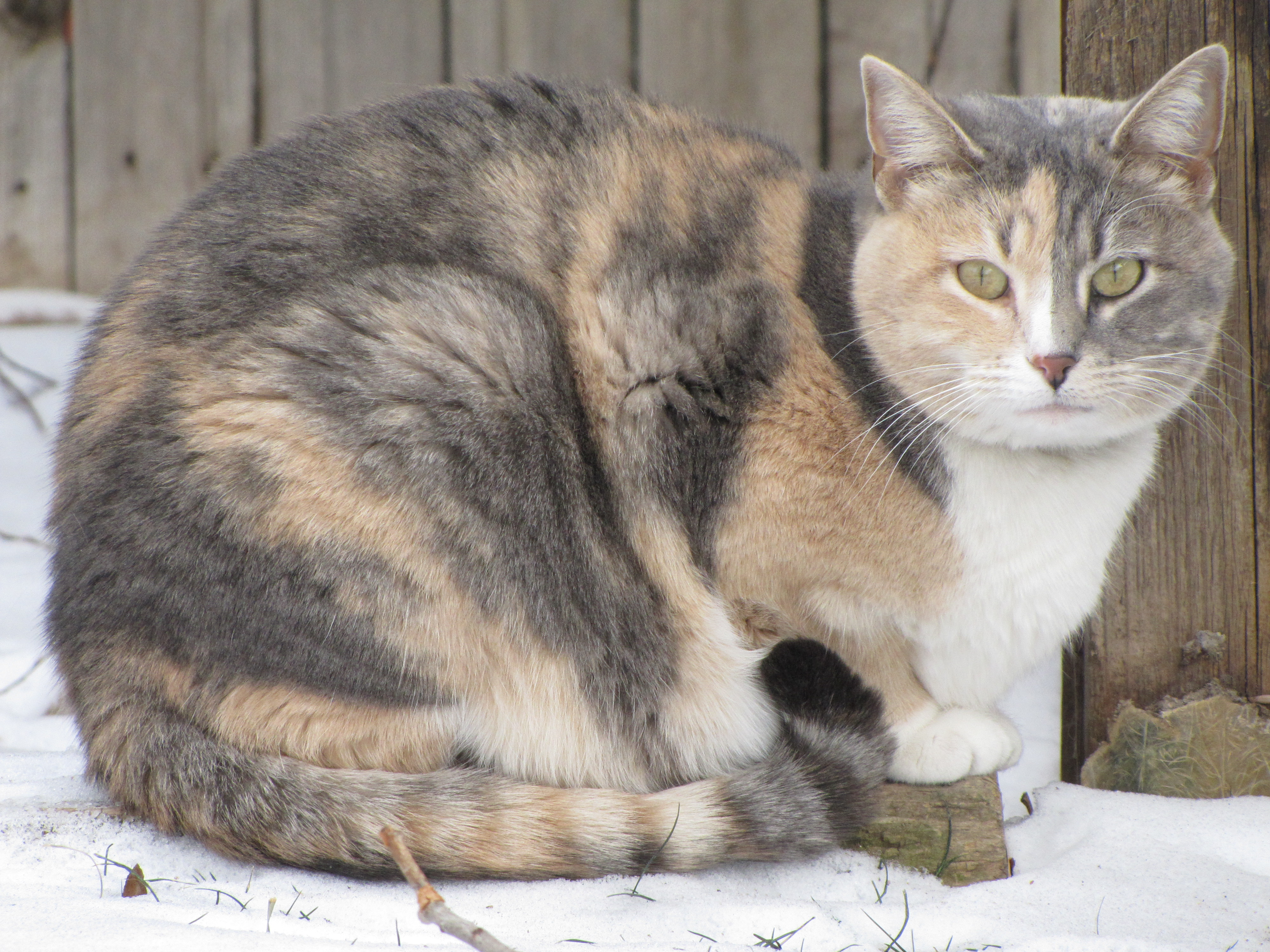
Blue tortoiseshell tabby and white

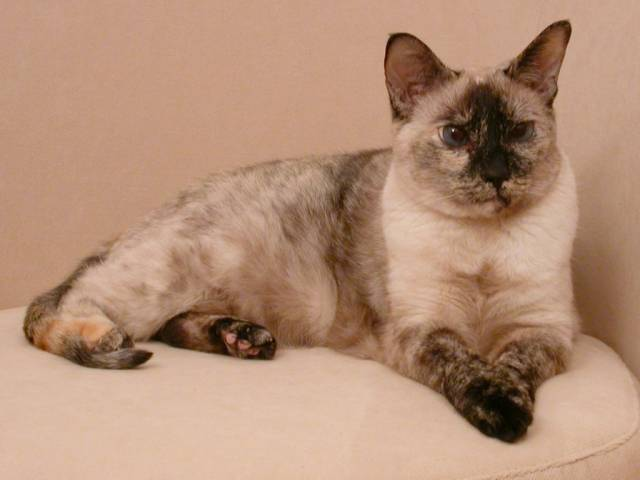
Black colourpoint tortoiseshell ("tortie point")

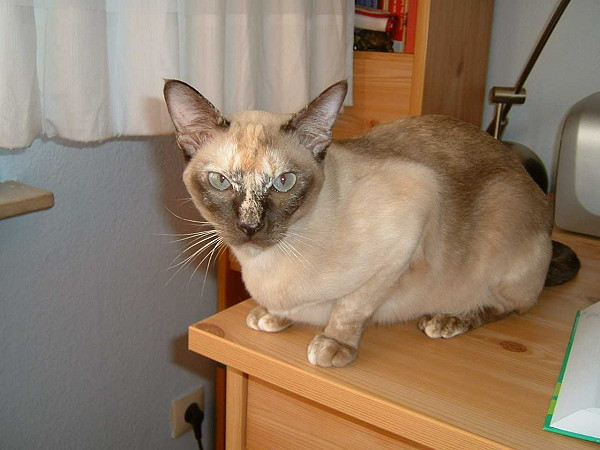
Chocolate tortoiseshell mink Tonkinese cat

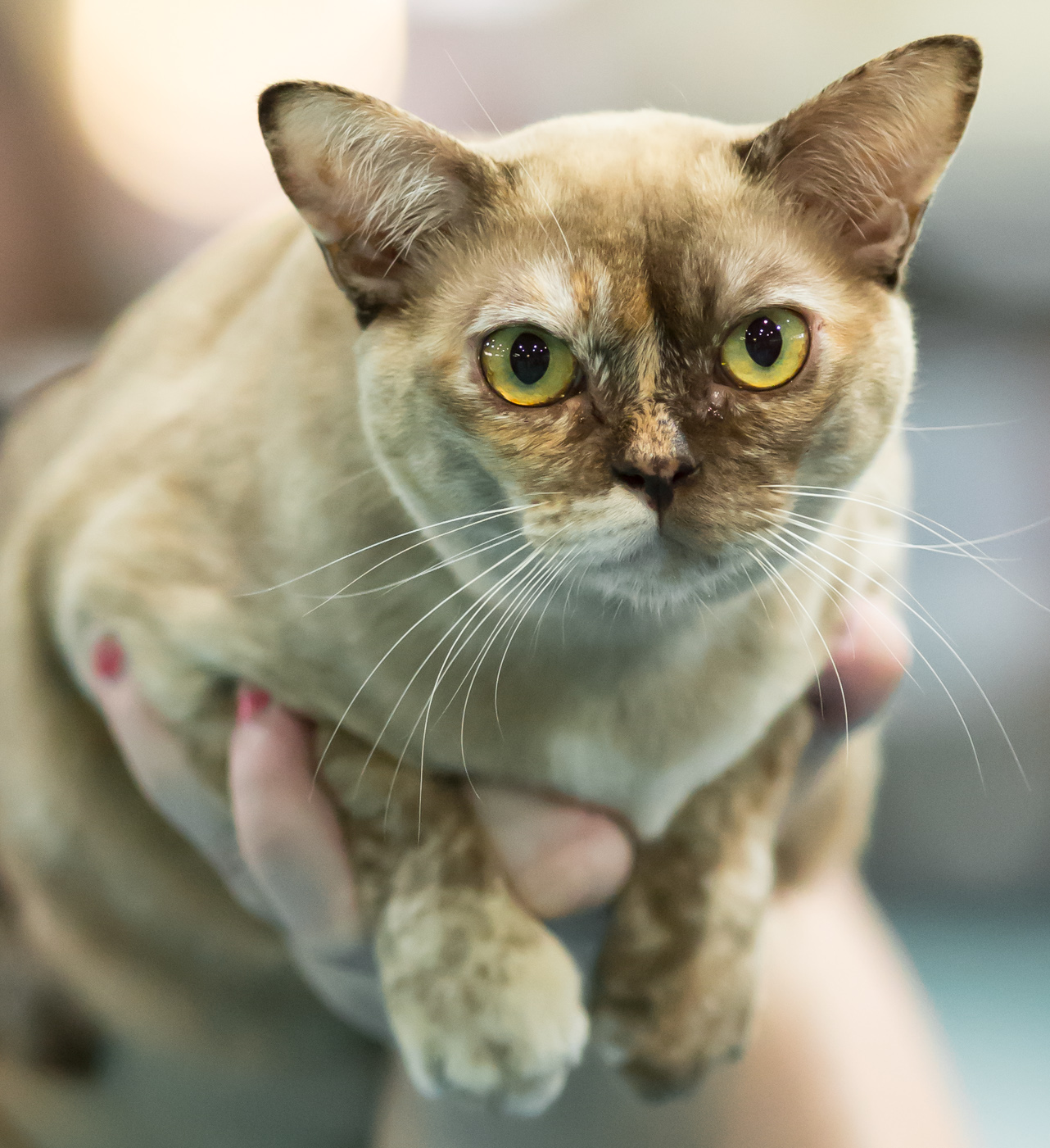
Chocolate tortoiseshell sepia Burmese

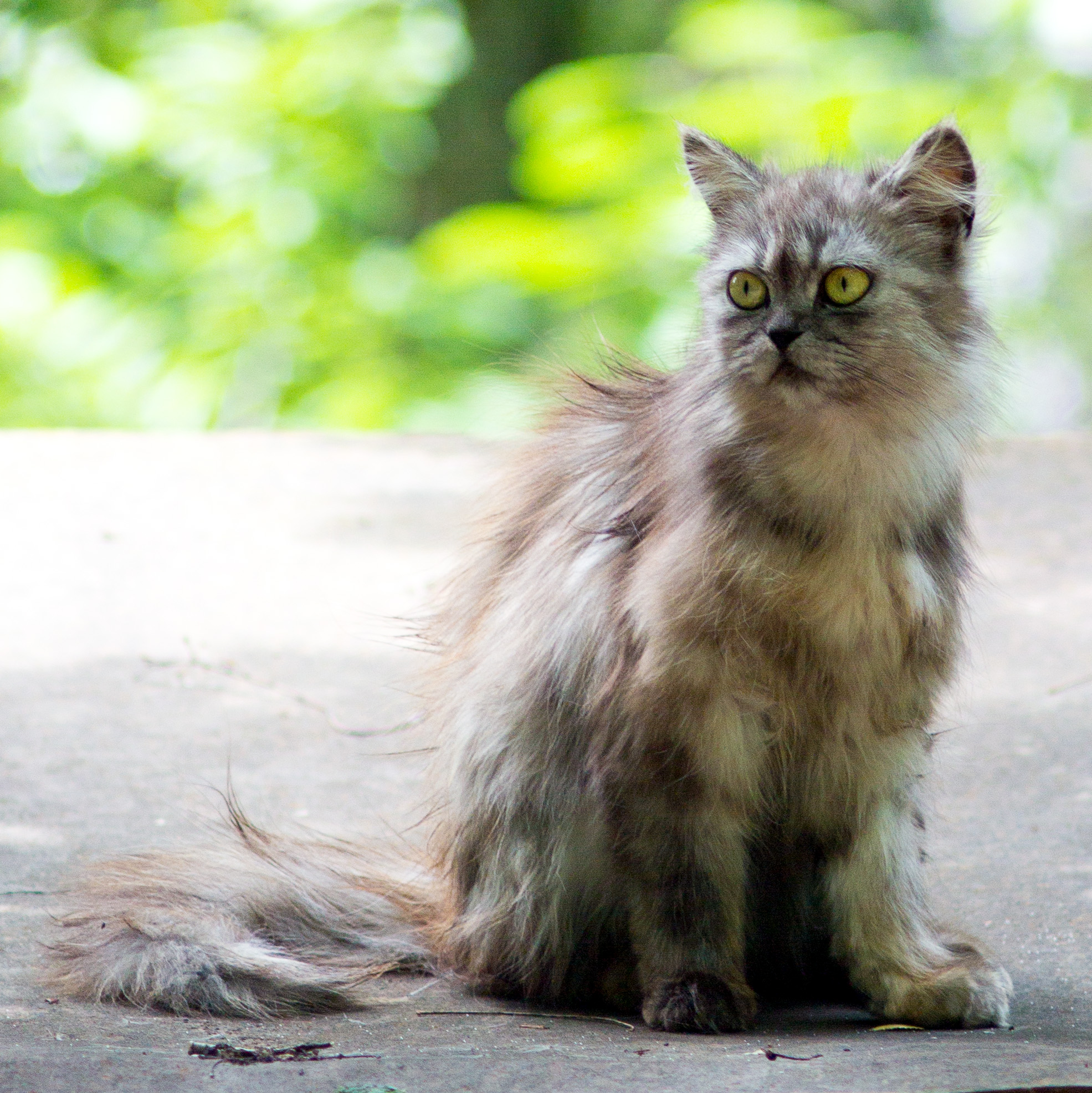
Black smoke tortoiseshell domestic longhair

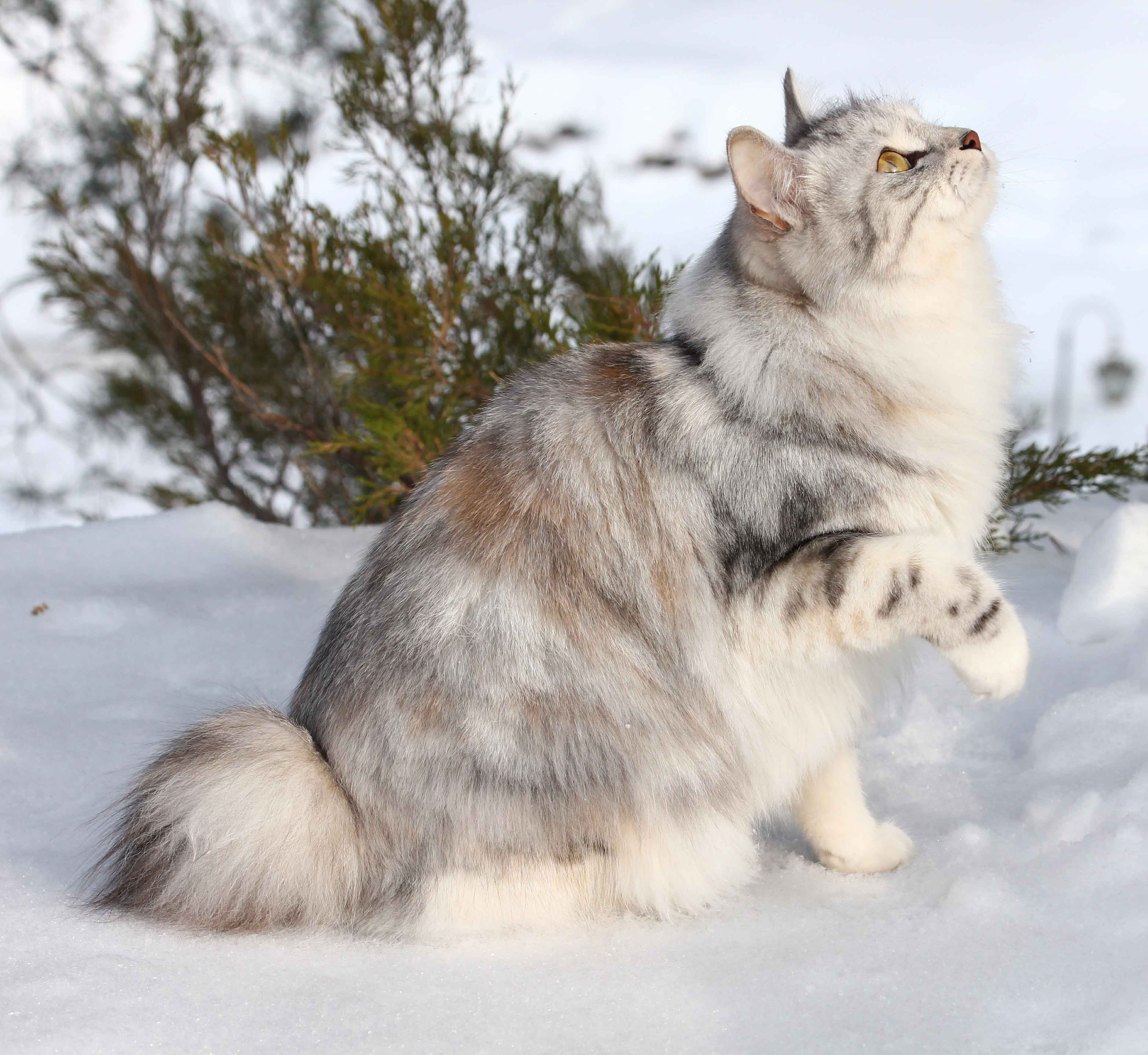
Black tortoiseshell silver blotched tabby Kurilian Bobtail Longhair

A female tortoiseshell cat with high black fur content

== See also ==
- Calico cat
- Deaf white cat
- Tabby cat
