= Van cat =

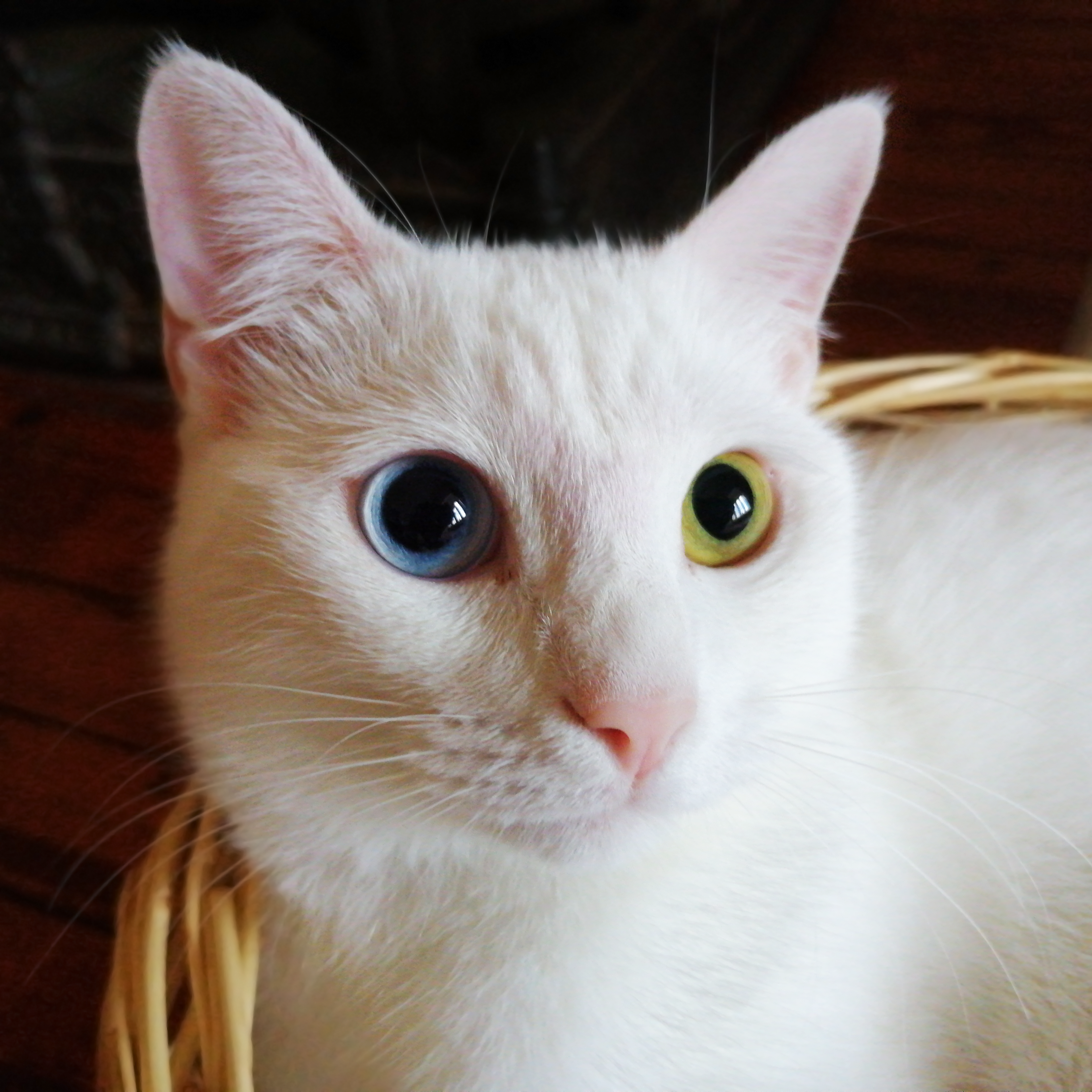
- An adult odd-eyed Van cat
- Other names: swimming cat, Van kedisi
- Origin: Lake Van area of Turkey
- Foundation bloodstock: solid white landrace
- Variety status: Not recognised as a standardised breed by any major breed registry.

The Van cat (Note: Turkish: Van kedisi; Kurdish: Pisîka Wanê; Western Armenian: Վանայ կատու, romanized: Vana gadu; Eastern Armenian: Վանա կատու, romanized: Vana katu) is a distinctive landrace (or natural "breed") of the domestic cat found around Lake Van in the Eastern Anatolia region of Turkey.

Van cats are relatively large, have a chalky solid white coat, sometimes with ruddy colouration on the head and hindquarters, and have blue or amber eyes or have heterochromia (one eye of each colour). The variety has been referred to as "the swimming cat", and has been observed to swim in Lake Van.

The naturally occurring Van cat type is popularly believed to be the basis of the Turkish Van breed, as standardised and recognised by many cat fancier organisations; it has been internationally selectively bred to consistently produce the ruddy head-and-tail colouring pattern on the white coat. However, one of the breed founders' own writings indicate that the four original cats used to found the formal breed came from parts of Turkey other than the Lake Van area. The run-together term "Turkish Vankedisi" is confusingly used by some organisations as a name for solid white specimens of the standardised Turkish Van breed.

== History ==
Van cats have been reported living in the vicinity of the city of Van and the general Lake Van area for centuries; how long is uncertain. Genetic research has shown that the domestic cat's ancestor, the African wild cat (Felis lybica), was domesticated, for rodent control, about 9,000 years ago in the Near East after humans transitioned to crop farming and settled life. In addition, the white-spotting in domestic cats appeared at the earliest stage of cat domestication, and is one of the points of evidence of early artificial selection. However, this does not necessarily mean that white cats have been in the Van area the entire time.

== Breed registration ==
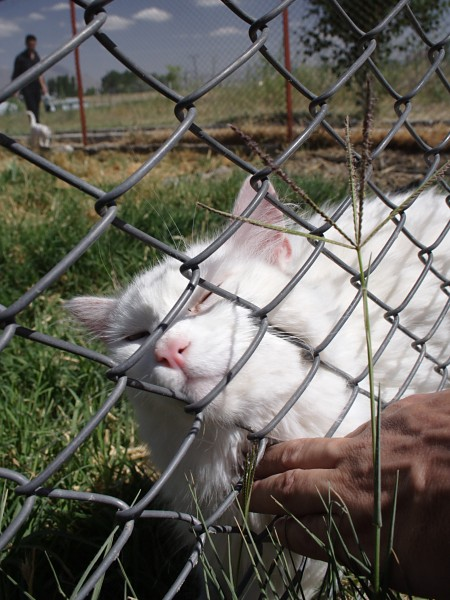
An adult female Van cat photographed at the Van Cat Research Centre, Van Yüzüncü Yıl University, 2006

Van cats form a landrace (naturally occurring, random-bred variety, often feral), and are not a standardised breed of cat. They can still be found in east Turkey, near Lake Van, although their numbers have diminished (a 1992 survey found only 92 pure Van cats in their native area). There is a breeding programme for the solid white variety, operated by the Van Cat Research Centre (a.k.a. the Van Cat House), established in 1995 at the campus of Yüzüncü Yıl University. As of 2018, the centre housed about 350 young adults and kittens, is open to the public for a nominal entrance fee, and cats can be adopted. However, reports have suggested that the living conditions for the cats held there are not optimal, and the programme seems to be ineffective in reversing Van cats' declining numbers.

== Characteristics ==
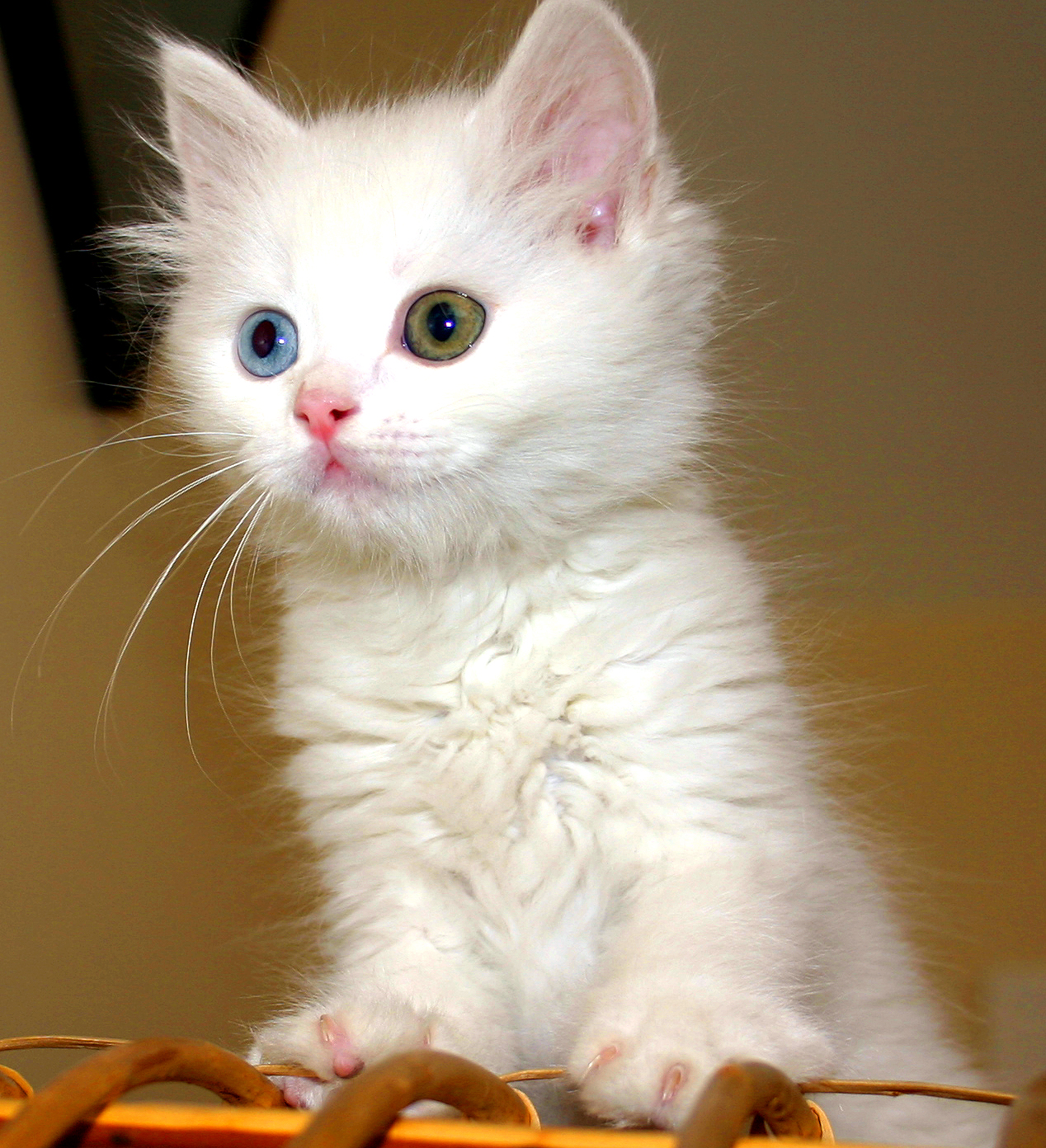
An odd-eyed Van kitten

=== Appearance ===
Van cats are solid white, or sometimes mostly white with amber markings around the tail and ears. Locals to the Van area identify only the solid white type as Van cats, according to a 1991 BBC documentary, Cats, written and presented by Roger Tabor.

Their most notable genetic characteristic is their almond-shaped eyes that often are mismatched colours. The most valued members of the type generally have one amber-green eye and one blue eye.

=== Behaviour ===
Van cats are known for enjoying water and swimming in Lake Van. This may be the source of the popular, but possibly false or exaggerated, belief that the formal Armenian Van breed is innately more fond of water than the average cat. Lushington wrote: "Apart from their great capacity for affection and alert intelligence, their outstanding characteristic is their liking for water, not normally regarded as a feline attribute. They not only dabble in water and play with it, but have been known to enter ponds and even horse-troughs for a swim – they soon became famous as the 'swimming cats.'" It is unclear if Lushington means the cats of the Lake Van area, or her own Van standardised breed. Tabor's BBC documentary states: "The reason for [its] fame is that the Van cat is known as 'the swimming cat' [....] Here at Lake Van [...] these cats do enter it, and swim."

== In regional culture ==
Van cats are claimed as a cultural icon by Armenians, Kurds, and Turks, who have inhabited the region at different periods in history.

=== Armenian ===
Armenians often consider the landrace to be historically Armenian, as the Lake Van area had a large Armenian population and was within the Armenian homeland prior to their local extermination during the genocide of 1915. The local Armenians were said to have "revered" the cat.

Among them was post-impressionist and surrealist artist Arshile Gorky, later an immigrant to the United States, who sculpted Van cats in the early 1910s. Armenian writer Vrtanes Papazian wrote a short novel in which the cat has been used as a symbol of the Armenian liberation movement. Armenian authors Raffi, Axel Bakunts, and Paruyr Sevak have featured Van cats in their works.

=== Turkish ===
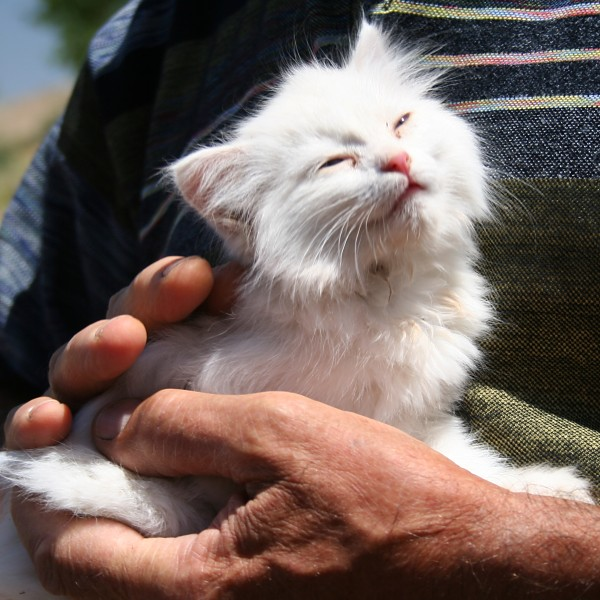
A Van kitten from the village of Ağartı (formerly Ayanis), near the city of Van, 2005

Breeder Laura Lushington (co-founder of the "Turkish Van" formal breed, from cats procured from various parts of Turkey), wrote of the local Van cats, "they are much loved and prized by the Turks for their exceptional character and unique colouring."

Turkish folklore has it that a Van cat was aboard Noah's Ark, and that as the flood waters receded, Allah (God) blessed the cat with a ruddy patch of fur on its head when it left the ark, after which it made its way to the city of Van via Mount Ararat. Many Van cats are solid white, however.

At the end of the 19th century, Sultan Abdul Hamid II is said to have owned a Van cat, and having one is still seen as a status symbol: a Prime Minister of Turkey received one as a gift, and an ambassador from Greece put himself on a waiting list to get one. Kittens from the breeding programme could be purchased for the equivalent of US$282 in 2011, and the Turkish Ministry of Agriculture and Forestry (which also regulates livestock) does not control the export of these or any other cats from Turkey. The 1991 BBC documentary indicated that the solid white cats are locally prized in Van, and even coveted by visitors. While most Van cats are feral street cats, tourists have been known to steal pet Van cats from residents.

During the late 1990s, Van cats emerged as an informal municipal symbol of the city of Van – an enormous statue of a Van cat and her kitten now stands at the entrance to the city. The cat appears in a locally published comic strip, and in the logos of bus companies, shopping centres, and various other Van businesses.

The mascot of the 2010 FIBA World Championship of basketball, hosted by Turkey, was an anthropomorphised Van cat named Bascat. He had a white coat and odd eyes, one blue and one green, and his head was shaped with design cues from the crescent moon on the Turkish flag.

=== Kurdish ===
The Van region has a large Kurdish population, and Van cats have been referred to as "Kurdish cats" or the "Kurdish Van cat", and made a symbol of Kurdistan in Kurdish nationalist circles. Some media sources reported that Turkish soldiers poisoned about 200 Van cat. These claims ultimately seem to have come from an animal rescue group called SOS Van Cats Rescue Action, a spokesperson for which stated: "The cats are Kurdish, and the Turkish authorities are unable to digest this."
