= Cat coat genetics =

Genetics responsible for the appearance of a cat's fur

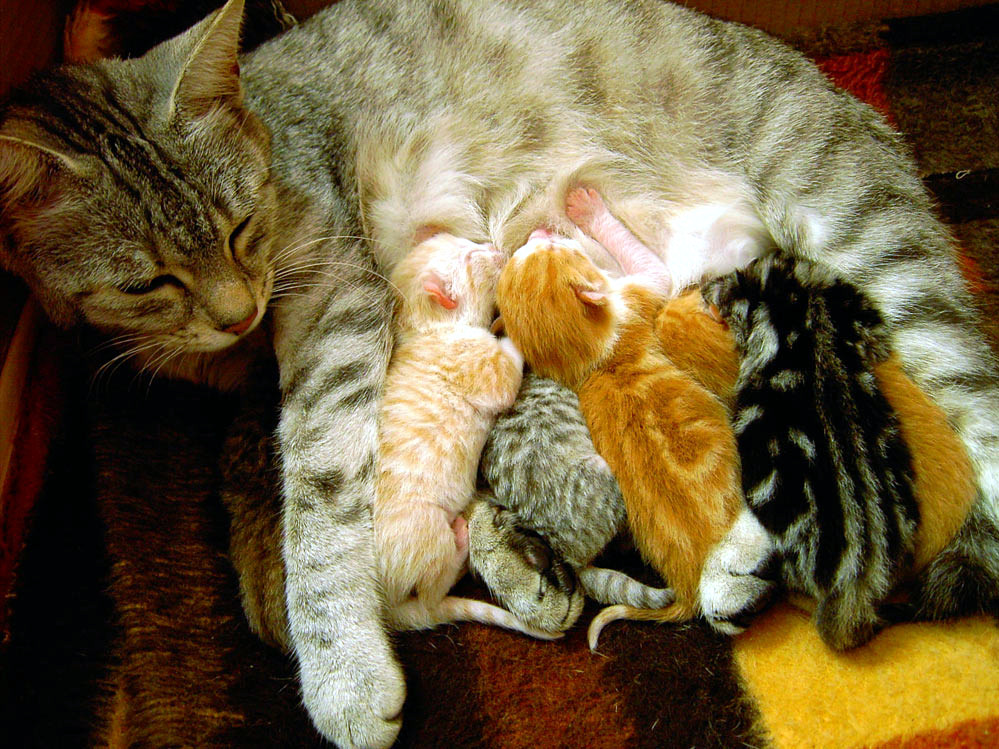
A tabby mother and her kittens, showing different colourations

Cat coat genetics determine the colouration, pattern, length, and texture of feline fur. The variations among cat coats are physical properties and should not be confused with cat breeds. A cat may display the coat of a certain breed without actually being that breed. For example, a Neva Masquerade (Siberian colourpoint) could wear point colouration, the coat typically associated with a Siamese.

== Solid colours ==
=== Eumelanin and phaeomelanin ===
==== Eumelanin ====
The browning gene B/b/b^{l} codes for TYRP1 (Q4VNX8), an enzyme involved in the metabolic pathway for eumelanin pigment production. The dominant form, B, will produce black eumelanin. It has two recessive variants, b (chocolate) and b^{l} (cinnamon), (Note: Cinnamon may also be written as 'b1' or 'bl', depending on the source.) with b^{l} being recessive to both B and b. Chocolate is a rich dark brown colour, and is referred to as chestnut in some breeds. Cinnamon is a light brown which may be a reddish colour.

==== Sex-linked red ====
Basic colours

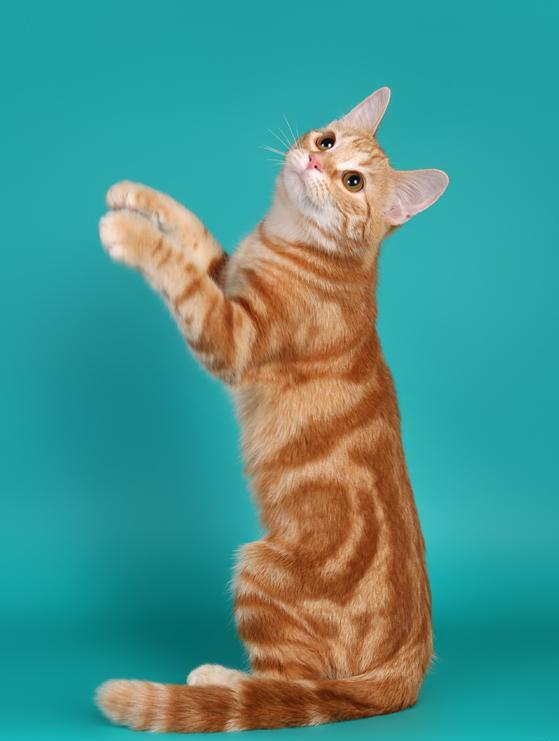
A male red tabby showing the X^{O}Y-phenotype

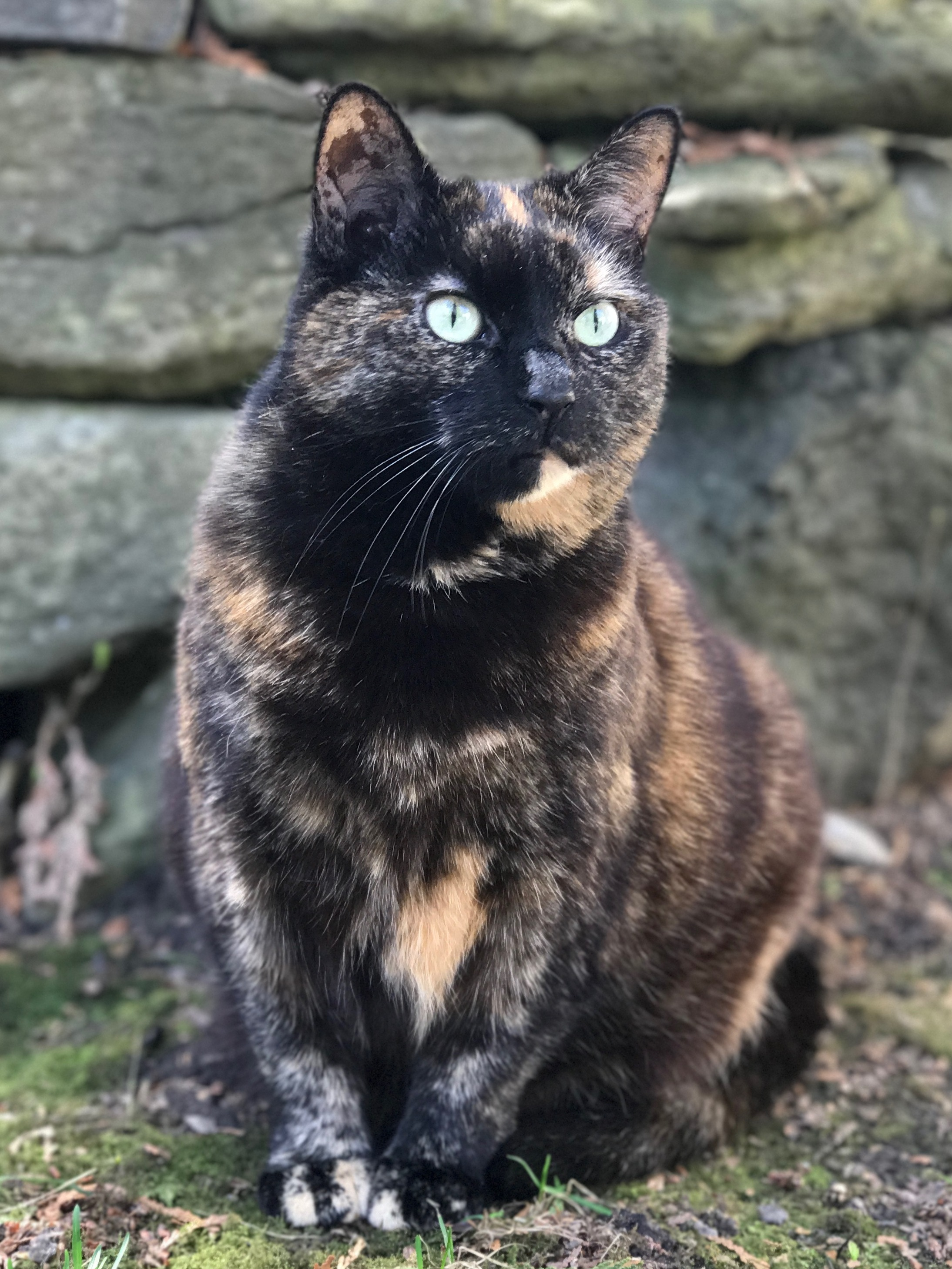
A female black tortoiseshell cat showing the X^{O}X^{o}-phenotype

The sex-linked red "Orange" locus, O/o, determines whether a cat will produce phaeomelanin. In cats with orange fur, phaeomelanin (red pigment) completely replaces eumelanin (black or brown pigment). This gene is located on the X chromosome. The orange allele is O, and non-orange is o. Males are typically only orange or non-orange due to only having one X chromosome. Since females have two X chromosomes, they have two alleles of this gene. OO results in orange fur, oo results in fur without any orange (black, brown, etc.), and Oo results in a tortoiseshell cat, in which some parts of the fur are orange and other areas non-orange. One in three thousand tortoiseshell cats are male, making the combination possible but rare - however, due to the nature of their genetics, male tortoiseshells often exhibit chromosomal abnormalities. In one study, less than a third of male tortoiseshells had a simple XXY Klinefelter's karyotype, slightly more than a third were complicated XXY mosaics, and about a third had no XXY component at all (XX/XY or XY/XY mosaics).

The coat colour commonly referred to as "orange" is scientifically known as red. Other common names include yellow, ginger, and marmalade. Red show cats have a deep orange colour, but it can also present as a yellow or light ginger colour. Polygenes that control the amount of phaeomelanin, known as "rufousing polygenes", are theorised to be the reason for this variance. Orange is epistatic to non-agouti, so all red cats are tabbies. Red cats that appear solid are usually low contrast ticked tabbies.

The identity of the gene at the Orange locus was narrowed down to a 3.5 Mb stretch on the X chromosome in 2009. In 2024 it was discovered that the dominant orange colour associated with the Orange locus is the result of a genomic deletion in a regulatory region of ARHGAP36, a Rho GTPase activating protein. The deletion results in a 13-fold increase in expression of the protein in melanocytes.

=== Dilution ===
Diluted colours

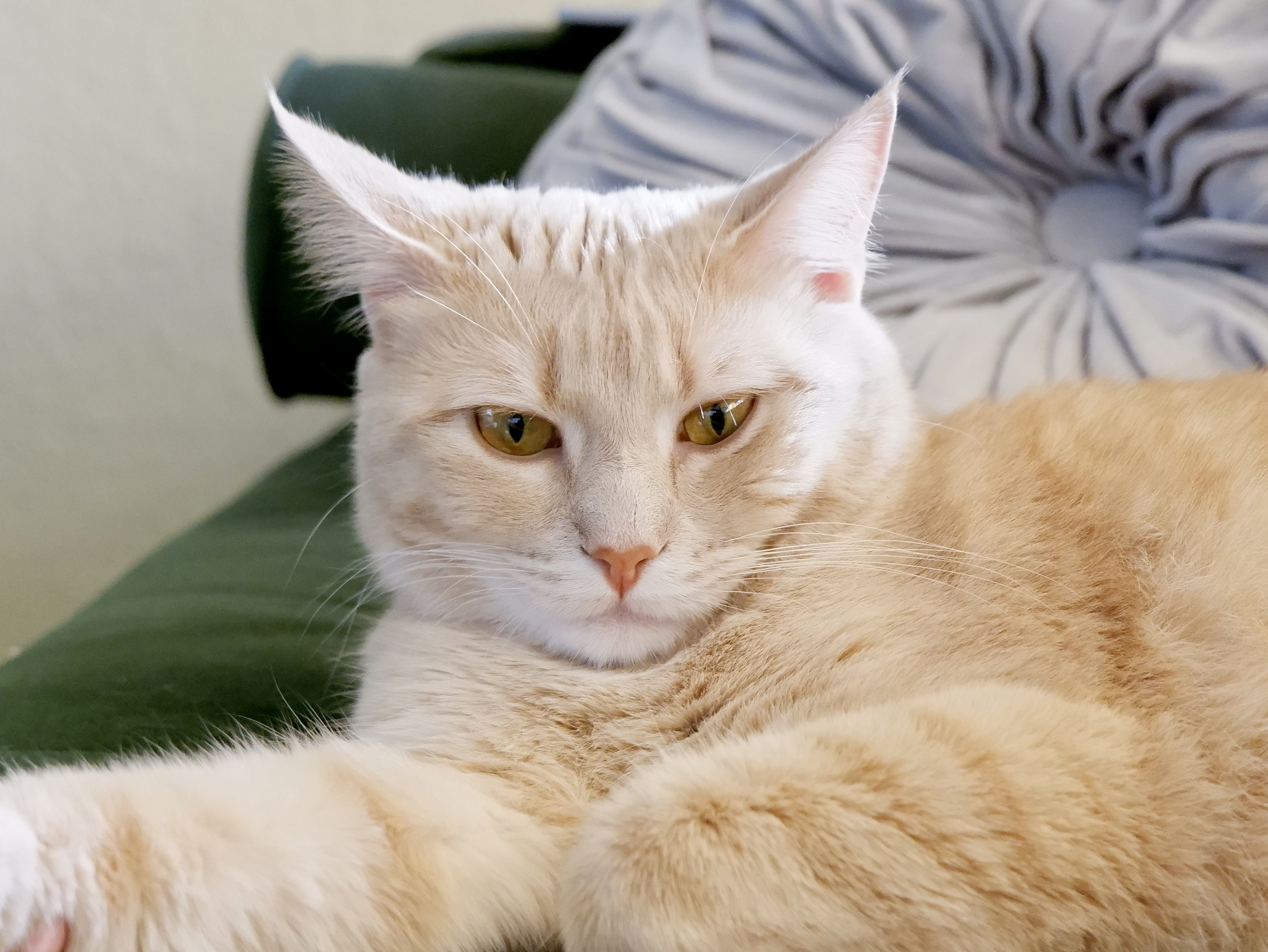
A cream (diluted red) tabby cat

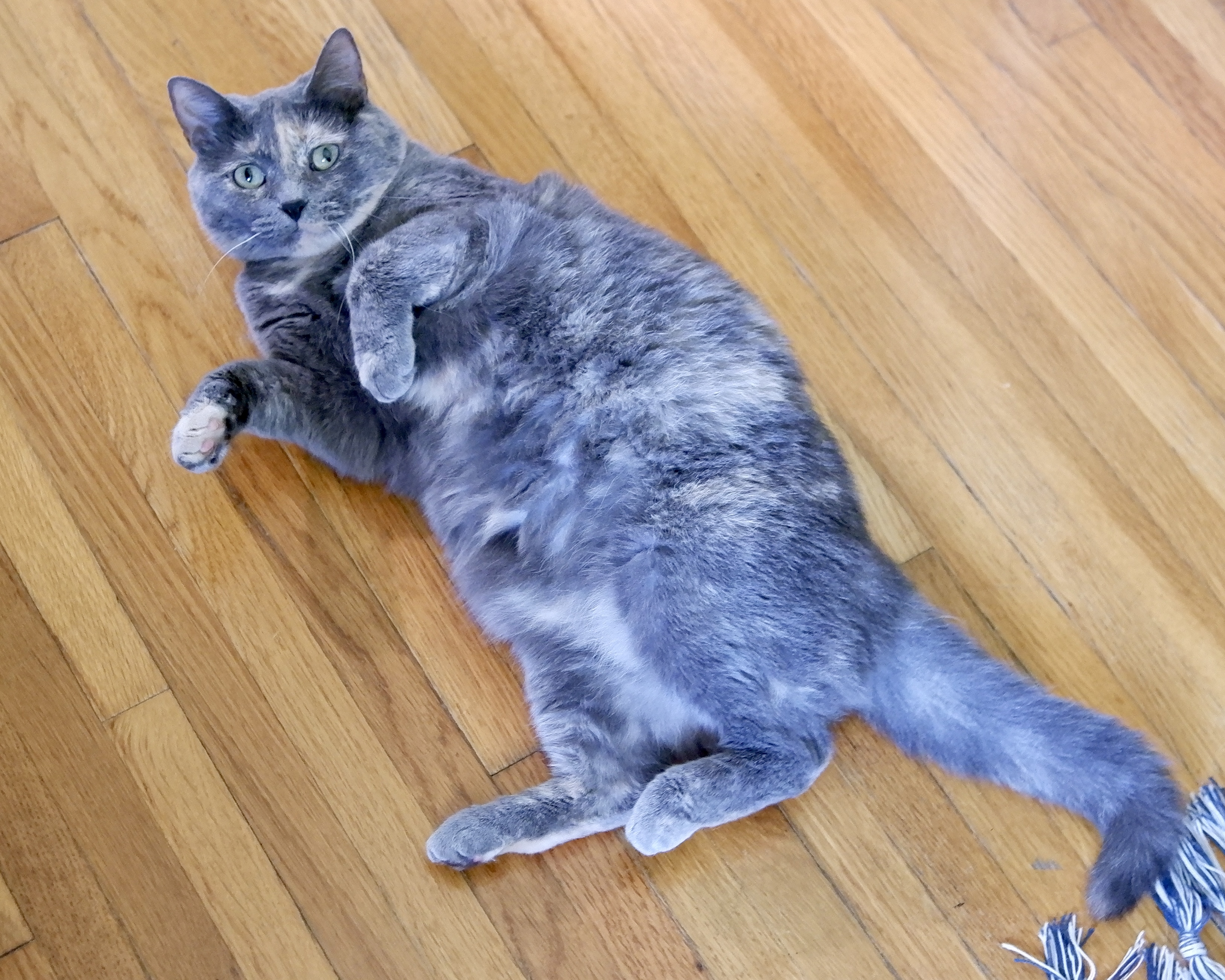
A blue (diluted black) tortoiseshell cat

The Dense pigment gene, D/d, codes for melanophilin (MLPH; A0SJ36), a protein involved in the transportation and deposition of pigment into a growing hair. When a cat has two of the recessive d alleles (Maltese dilution), black fur becomes "blue" (appearing grey), chocolate fur becomes "lilac" (appearing light, almost greyish brown-lavender), cinnamon fur becomes "fawn", and red fur becomes "cream". Similar to red cats, all cream cats are tabbies. The d allele is a single-base deletion that truncates the protein. If the cat has d/d genes, the coat is diluted. If the genes are D/D or D/d, the coat will be unaffected.

Overview of dilutions in cat coat colours
Basic colour	Dilution	Dilute modifier, double dilution
Black ("brown")	Blue ("grey")	Caramel, blue-based caramel (UK)
Chocolate	Lilac	Taupe, lilac-based caramel (UK)
Cinnamon	Fawn	Fawn-based caramel (UK)
Red ("orange")	Cream	Apricot
Amber	Light amber	Unknown
White	N/A	N/A

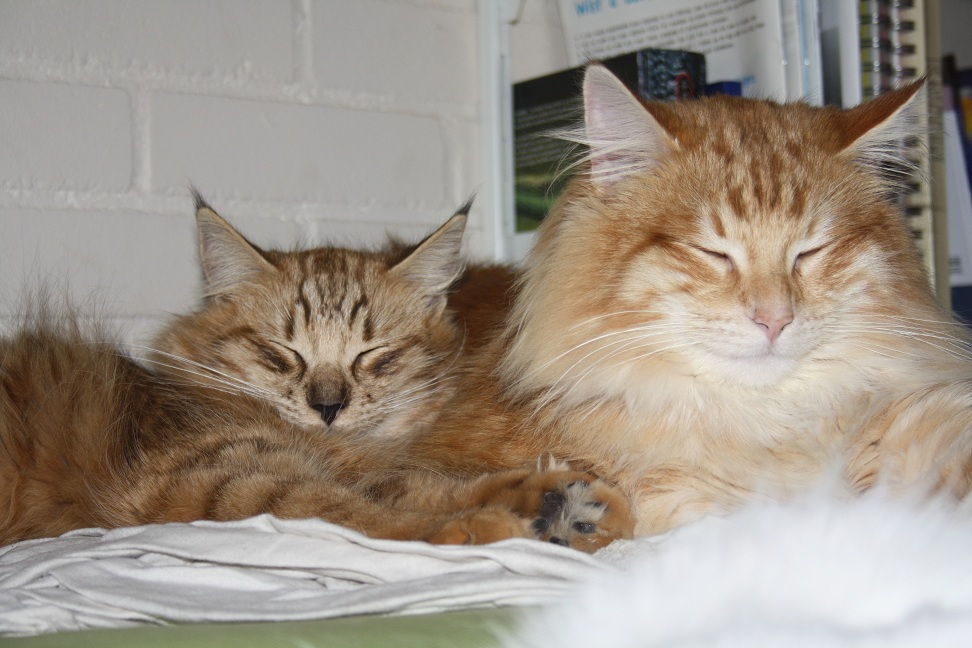
Two amber tabby Norwegian Forest Cats, showing the colour difference with age. On the left a female kitten, on the right a male adult.

=== Other genes ===
- Barrington Brown is a recessive browning gene that dilutes black to mahogany, brown to light brown and chocolate to pale coffee. It is different from the browning gene and has only been observed in laboratory cats.
- The Dilution modifier gene, Dm, "caramelises" the dilute colours as a dominant trait. The existence of this phenomenon as a discrete gene is a controversial subject among feline enthusiasts.
- Amber, a mutation at the extension locus E/e (the melanocortin 1 receptor; MC1R) changes black pigment to amber or light amber, similar in appearance to red and cream. Kittens are born dark but lighten up as they age. Paws and nose still exhibit the original undiluted colour in contrast to other diluted colours, where paws and nose have the diluted colour. This phenomenon was first identified in Norwegian Forest Cats.
- Another recessive mutation at extension was discovered which causes the "russet" colour in Burmese cats. It is symbolised as e^{r}. Like amber cats, russet cats lighten as they age.
- A modifying factor has also been hypothesised in shaded silver and chinchilla Persians whose fur turns pale golden in adulthood, due to low levels of phaeomelanin production. These cats resemble shaded or tipped goldens, but are genetically shaded or tipped silvers. This is probably related to the phenomenon known as "tarnishing" in silvers.

== Tabbies ==
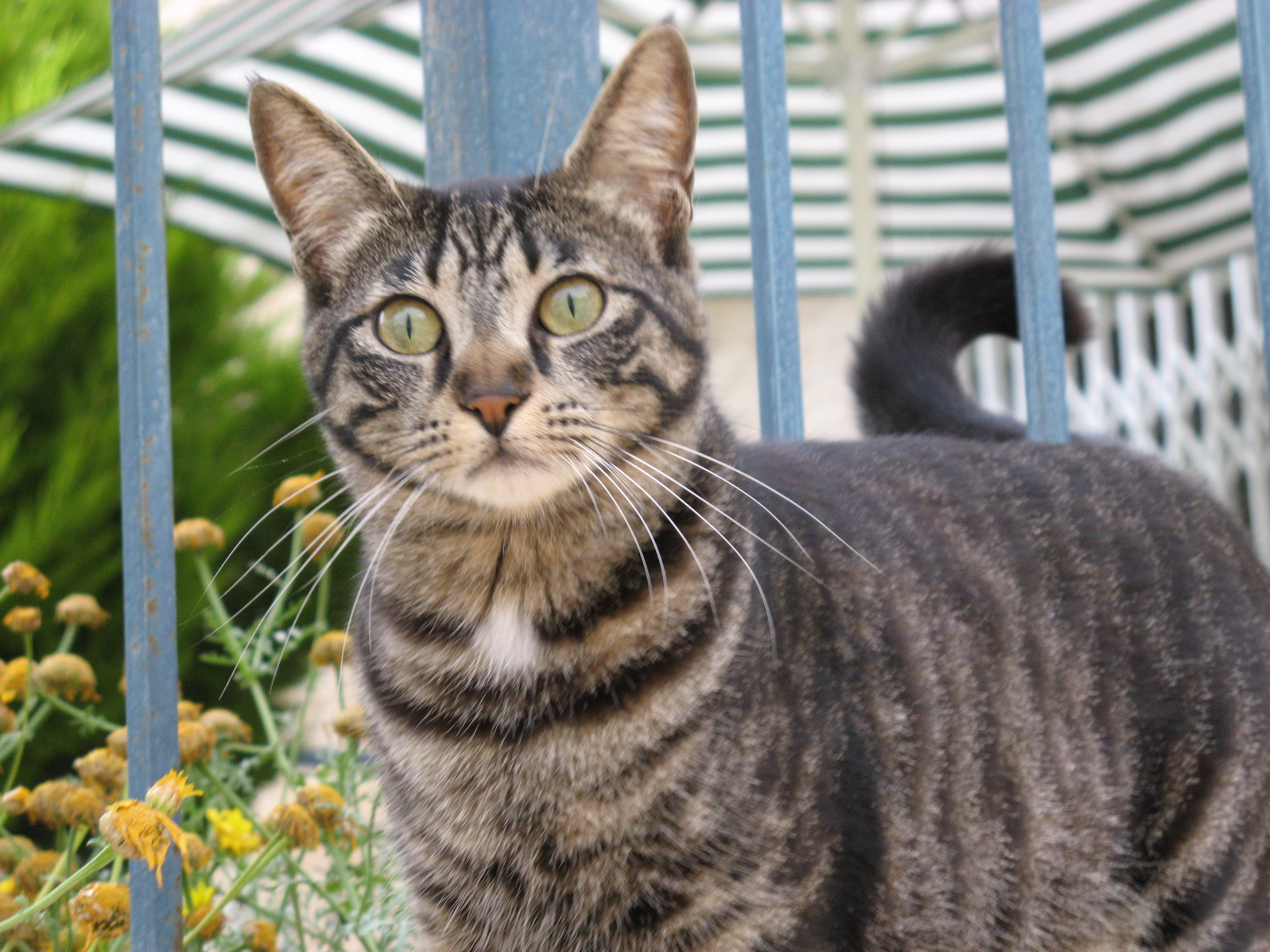
A mackerel black tabby with the classic "M" on the forehead

Tabby cats have a range of variegated and blotched coats, consisting of a dark pattern on a lighter background. This variety is derived from the interplay of multiple genes and resulting phenotypes. Most tabbies feature thin dark markings on the face, including the 'M' on the forehead and an eyeliner effect, pigmented lips and paws, and a pink nose outlined in darker pigment. The following tabby coat patterns are all naturally found in the domestic cat:

- Mackerel: Thin, dark stripes (sometimes called "tiger stripes").
- Blotched/Classic: Thicker bands or whorls of dark pigment.
- Spotted: Broken bands that look more like individual spots. The flanks only contain spots, no stripes.
- Ticked: No distinct stripes, spots, or blotches on the body—though some may be visible on the legs, face, and tail.
Tabby patterns

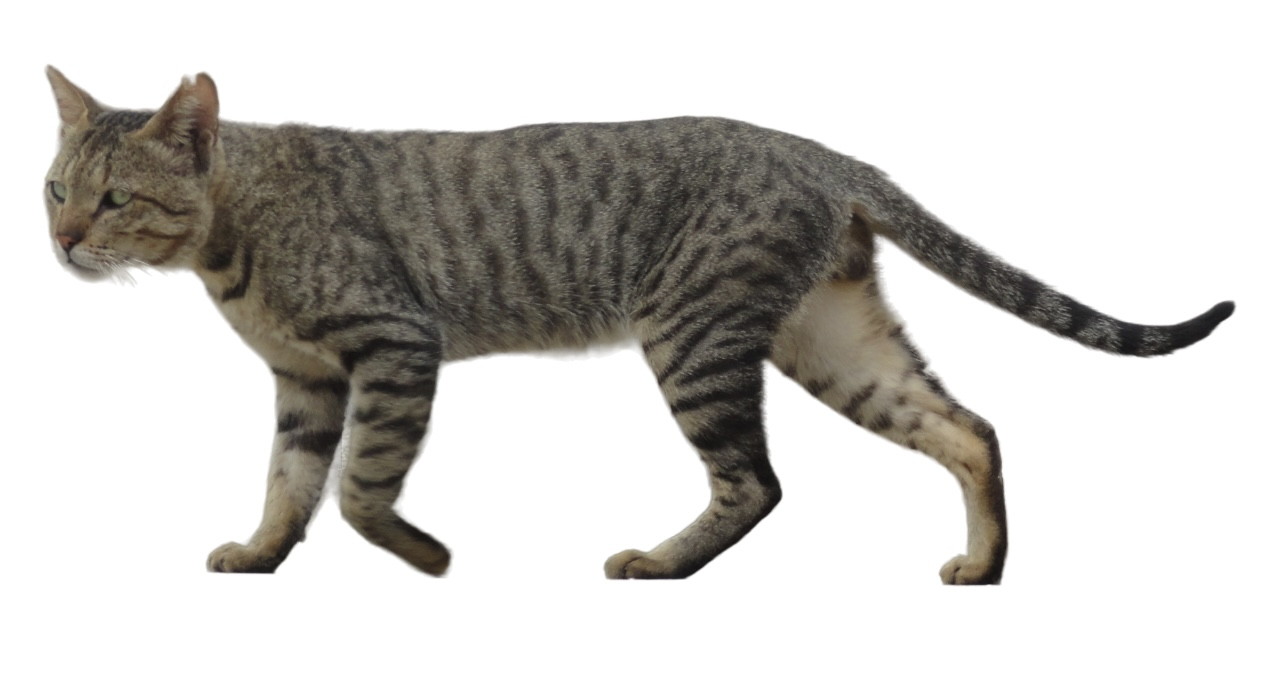
Mackerel

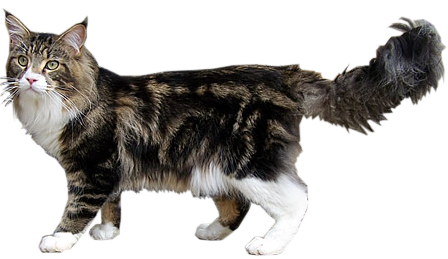
Blotched / classic

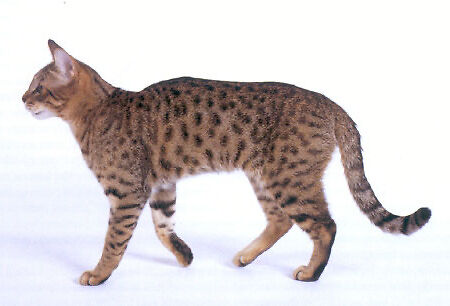
Spotted

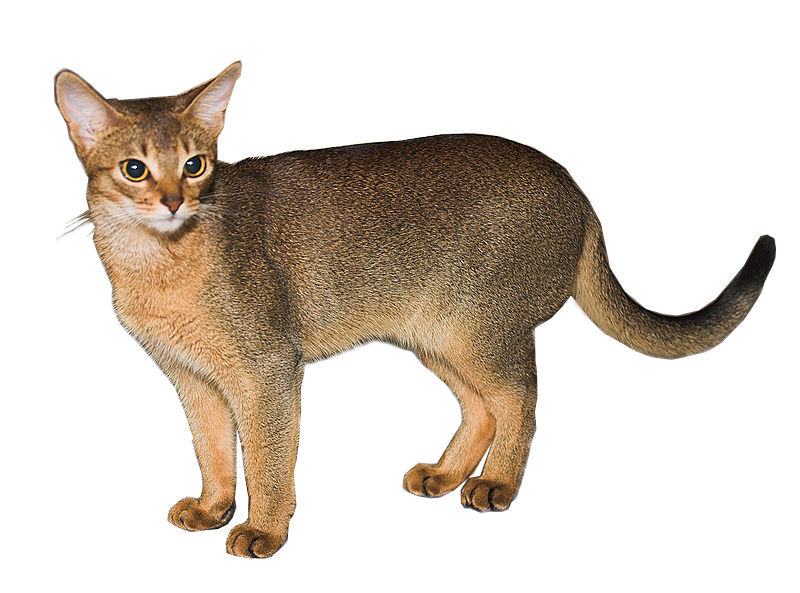
Ticked

=== Agouti ===
Agouti hair showing alternating bands along the shaft

The agouti factor determines the "background" of the tabby coat, which consists of hairs that are banded with dark eumelanin and lighter phaeomelanin along the length of the hair shaft. The Agouti gene, with its dominant A allele and recessive a allele, controls the coding for agouti signalling protein (ASIP; Q865F0). The wild-type dominant A causes the banding and thus an overall lightening effect on the hair, while the recessive non-agouti or "hypermelanistic" allele a does not initiate this shift in the pigmentation pathway. As a result, homozygous aa have pigment production throughout the entire growth cycle of the hair and therefore along its full length. These homozygotes are solidly dark throughout, which obscures the appearance of the characteristic dark tabby markings—sometimes a suggestion of the underlying pattern, called "ghost striping", can be seen, especially on kittens and on adults in bright slanted light, in smokes, and sometimes on the forehead, legs, tail or elsewhere.

A major exception to the solid masking of the tabby pattern exists, as the O allele of the O/o locus is epistatic over the aa genotype. That is, in red or cream coloured cats, tabby marking is displayed regardless of the genotype at the agouti locus. However, some red and most cream tabbies do have a fainter pattern when lacking an agouti allele, indicating that the aa genotype does still have a faint effect even if it does not induce complete masking. The mechanism of this process is unknown.

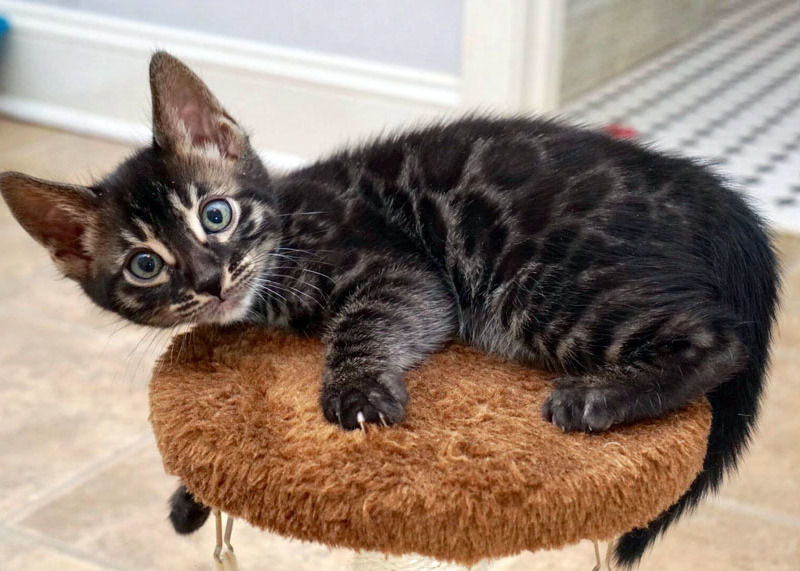
Black charcoal rosetted tabby Bengal kitten with dark "mask"

An example of the Agouti gene can be seen in Bengal cats, which are a hybrid between Asian leopard cats and domestic cats. The breed sports the hybrid 'charcoal' pattern, a pseudomelanistic marking which has a characteristic dark face marking, the "mask", and a broad dorsal stripe down its back, the "cape". According to Gershoney et al., the charcoal mask is indicated to be the result of a heterozygote of A^{Pbe}/a. The relationships between the different agouti alleles is not fully understood. More research is required to determine the inheritance modes for charcoal.

=== Tabby markings ===
The Tabby locus on chromosome A1 accounts for most tabby patterns seen in domestic cats, including those patterns seen in most breeds. The dominant allele Ta^{M} produces mackerel tabbies, and the recessive Ta^{b} produce classic ('blotched') tabbies. The gene responsible for this differential patterning had been identified as transmembrane aminopeptidase Q (Taqpep, M3XFH7). The gene name Taqpep has later been replaced by laeverin with symbol LVRN. A threonine to asparagine substitution at residue 139 (T139N) in this protein is responsible for producing the tabby phenotype in domestic cats. In cheetahs, a base pair insertion into exon 20 of the protein replaces the 16 C-terminal residues with 109 new ones (N977Kfs110), generating the king cheetah coat variant.

The wild-type (in African wildcats) is the mackerel tabby (stripes look like thin fishbones and may break up into bars or spots). The most common variant is the classic tabby pattern (broad bands, whorls, and spirals of dark colour on pale background usually with bulls-eye or oyster pattern on flank). Spotted tabbies have their stripes broken up into spots, which may be arranged vertically or horizontally. A 2010 study suggests that spotted coats are caused by the modification of mackerel stripes, and may cause varying phenotypes such as "broken mackerel" tabbies via multiple loci. These genes have no effect on cats with a ticked coat.

==== Ticked tabby ====
The Ticked (Ti) locus on chromosome B1 controls the generation of "ticked coats", agouti coats with virtually no stripes or bars. Ticked tabbies are rare in the random-bred population outside Asia, but fixed in certain breeds such as the Abyssinian and Singapura. Ti^{A} is the dominant allele that produces ticked coats; Ti^{+} is the recessive one. The causative gene for ticked tabby markings is Dickkopf-related protein 4 (DKK4). Both a cysteine to tyrosine substitution at residue 63 (C63Y) and an alanine to valine substitution at residue 18 (A18V) result in decreased DKK4, which is associated with ticking. Both variants are present in the Abyssinian breed, and the A18V variant is found in the Burmese breed. Stripes often remain to some extent on the face, tail, legs, and sometimes the chest ("bleeding through"). Traditionally, this has been thought to happen in heterozygotes (Ti^{A}Ti^{+}) but be nearly or completely nonexistent in homozygotes (Ti^{A}Ti^{A}). The ticked tabby allele is epistatic to and therefore completely (or mostly) masks all the other tabby alleles, "hiding" the patterns they would otherwise express.

It was once thought that Ti^{A} was an allele of the Tabby gene, called T^{a}, dominant to all other alleles at the locus.

=== Other genes ===
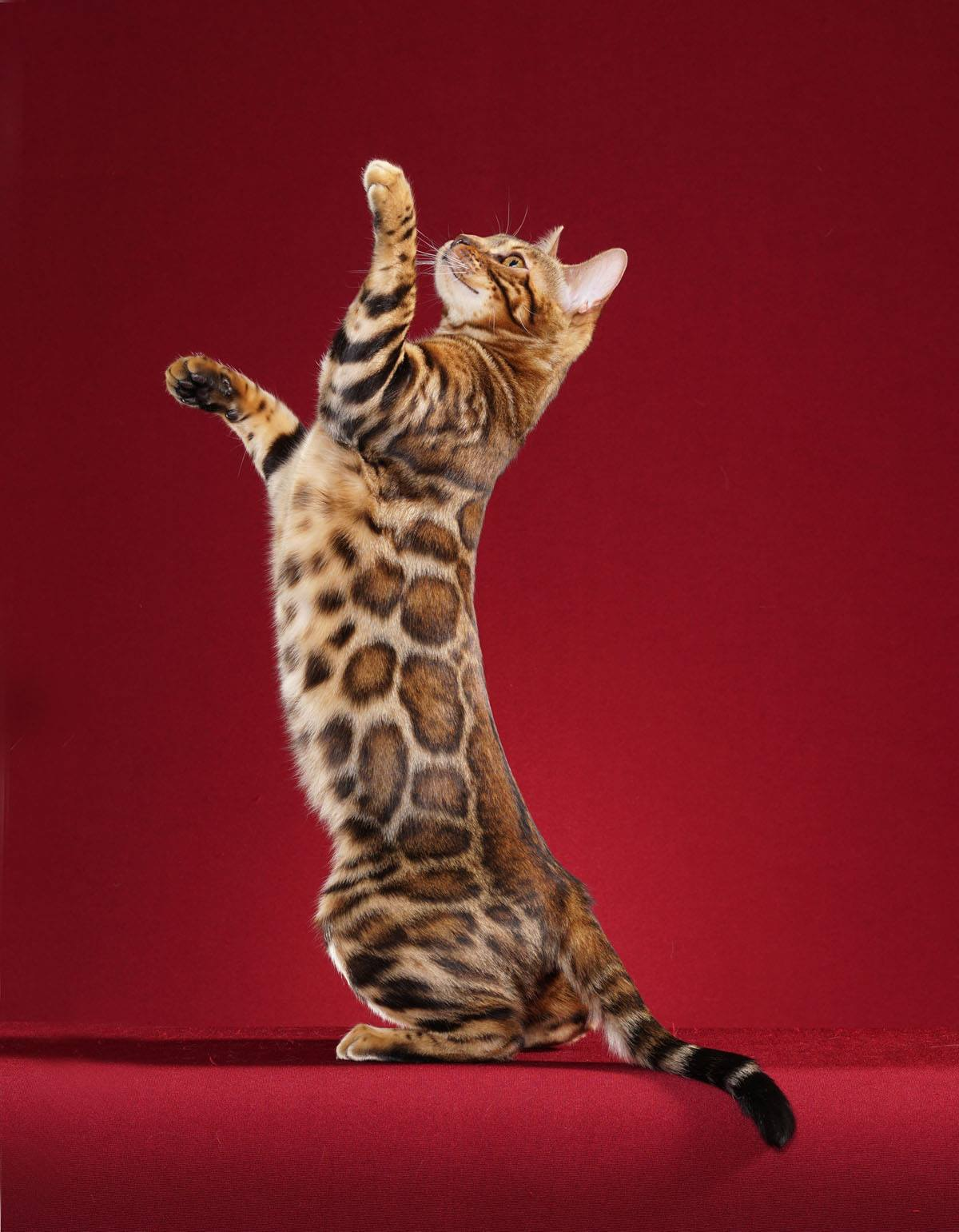
Rosetted tabby pattern in a Bengal.

- Other genes (pattern modifier genes) are theorised to be responsible for creating various type of spotting patterns, many of which are variations on a basic mackerel or classic pattern. There are also hypothetical factors which affect the timing and frequency of the agouti shift, affecting agouti band width and the number and quality of alternating bands of eumelanin and phaeomelanin on individual hairs.
- There is a gene not yet identified, but believed to be related to the agouti gene in the Chausie breed that produces silver-tipped black fur similar to Abyssinian ticked fur, known as "grizzled". This phenomenon is purported to have been inherited from the hybridisation of the domestic cat to the jungle cat (Felis chaus).
- The rosette tabby pattern is a pattern similar to that of a leopard, where rosette spots are spread over the body. The pattern is found in hybrid cat breeds, such as the Bengal and Safari.
- The inhibited pigment gene, I/i. The dominant allele (I) produces tipped hairs that are fully coloured only at the tip and have a white base. This allele appears to interact with other genes to produce various degrees of tipping, ranging from deeply tipped silver tabby to lightly tipped shaded silver and chinchilla silver. The inhibitor gene interacts with the non-agouti genotype (I-aa) to produce the colour known as smoke. The homozygous recessive genotype when combined with the agouti gene (iiA-), produces tabby colouration, which can vary along a spectrum ranging from a deeply patterned brown tabby, to a lighter "golden tabby", to the very lightly coloured shaded or chinchilla golden colours. Red and cream cats with the inhibitor gene (I-O-) are commonly called "cameo".

== Tortoiseshells ==
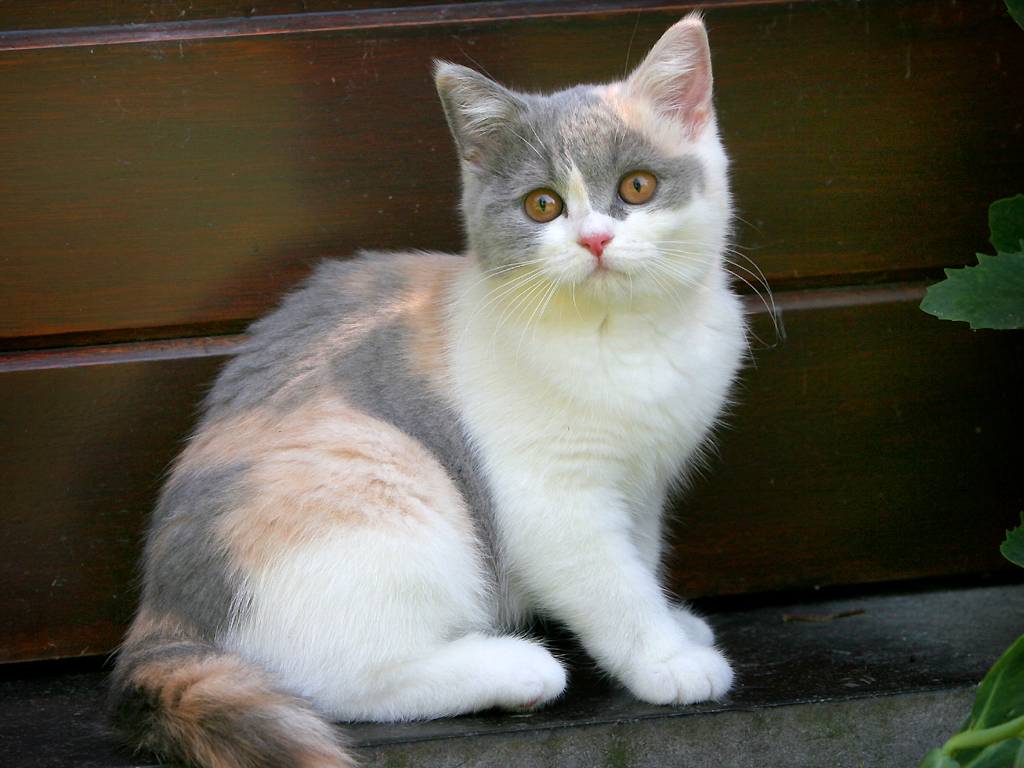
Blue tortoiseshell and white (US: diluted calico) British Shorthair

Tortoiseshell is a coat pattern that combines two colours, other than white, in an asymmetrical distribution, either closely mixed ('brindled') or in larger patches. The two colours always consist of one eumelanistic (black, blue, chocolate, lilac, cinnamon or fawn) and one phaeomelanistic (red or cream) colour. The pattern is caused by X-inactivation, which requires two X chromosomes, consequently the vast majority of tortoiseshells are female, with approximately 1 in 3,000 being male. Male tortoiseshells can occur as a result of chromosomal abnormalities (e.g. Klinefelter syndrome), by mosaicism, or by a phenomenon known as chimaerism (two early stage embryos are merged into a single kitten).

Tortoiseshell should not be mistaken for the natural gradations of colour hues in a tabby pattern. The shades which are present in the ground colour (pale regions) of a tabby are not considered to constitute a separate colour. High degree of warm tones in the ground colour are instead referred to as rufousing factors or rufism.

=== Tricolour cats ===
Tortoiseshells with white spotting are known as "tricolour" or "tortoiseshell and white". (Note: Also known as mi-ke (meaning "triple fur") in Japanese, and lapjeskat (meaning "patches cat") in Dutch.) Those with approximately 25–75% white are known in North America as "calico". A tricolour consist of three colours: white, a phaeomelanin red-based colour (red or cream), and eumelanin black-based colour (e.g. black or blue).

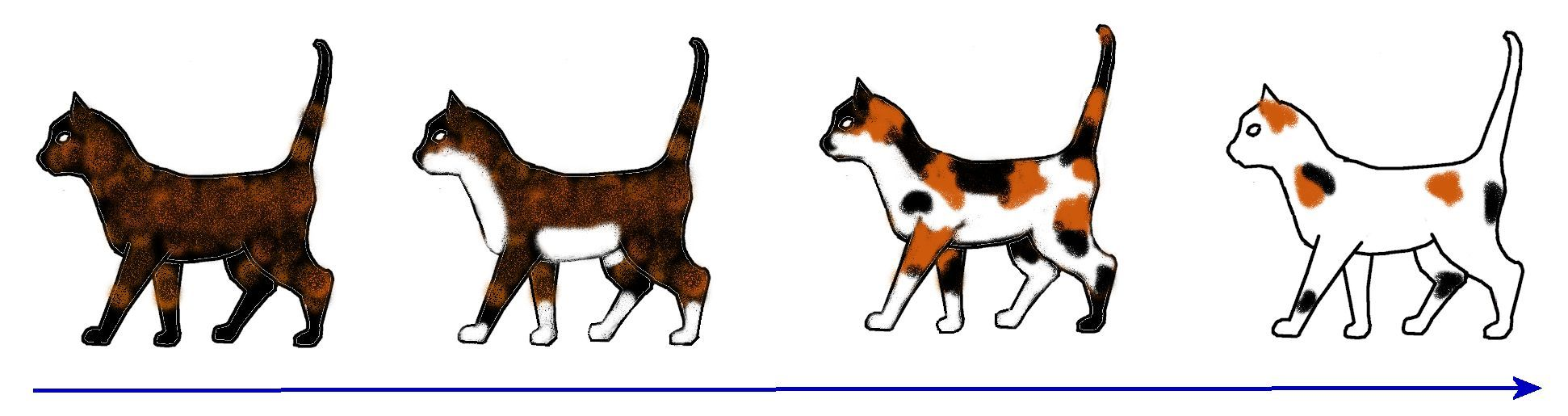
Schematic presentation of how white spotting affects tortoiseshell colour distribution. As the amount of white spotting increases, the tortoiseshell colour becomes less brindled and forms distinct patches of colour. This is related to the migration rates of pigment cells across the surface of the embryo.

In tricolour cats, the factor that distinguishes brindled patterns from distinct patches is the placement of eumelanin and phaeomelanin pigment, which is partly dependent on the amount of white, due to an effect of the white spotting gene on the general distribution of melanin. A cat which has both an orange and non-orange gene, Oo, and little to no white spotting, will present with a brindled (mottled) blend of black-based and red-based pigments, reminiscent of tortoiseshell material (called tortoiseshell cat in the US). An Oo cat with a large amount of white will have bigger, clearly defined patches of black-based and red-based pigments (called a "calico" in the US).

=== Variations ===
- The basic tortoiseshell pattern has several different colours depending on the colour of the eumelanin (the B locus), and dilution (the D locus).
- Tortoiseshell tabbies, also known as torbies, display tabby patterning on both red- and black-based colours. Calico tabbies are colloquially also called calibys or tabicos. (Note: In North American English) Tortoiseshell cats with small white patches are called tortico cats, a portmanteau of calico and tortoiseshell. Blue tortoiseshell (US: diluted calico) cats have a lighter colouration (blue/cream) and are sometimes called calimanco or clouded tiger.

== White spotting and epistatic white ==
White spotting locus

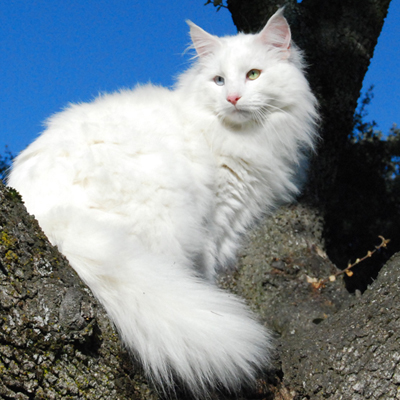
Dominant white; solid white Norwegian Forest Cat

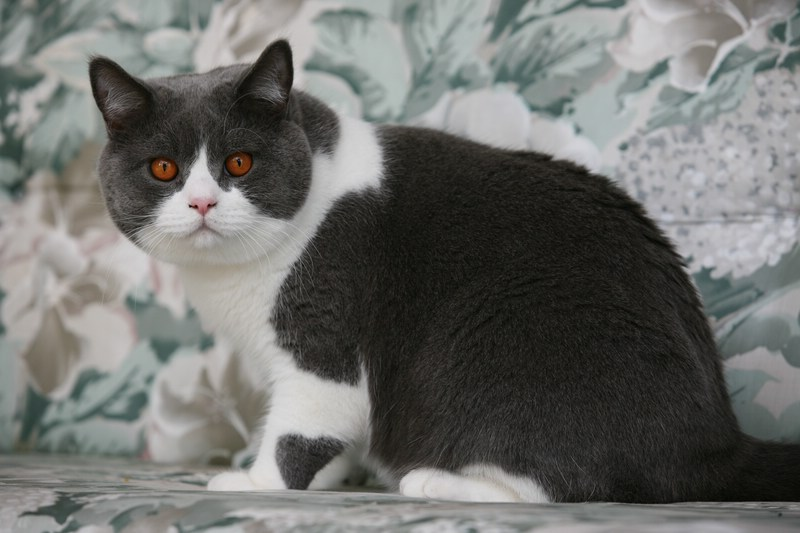
White spotting; blue ('grey') and white bicolour British Shorthair cat

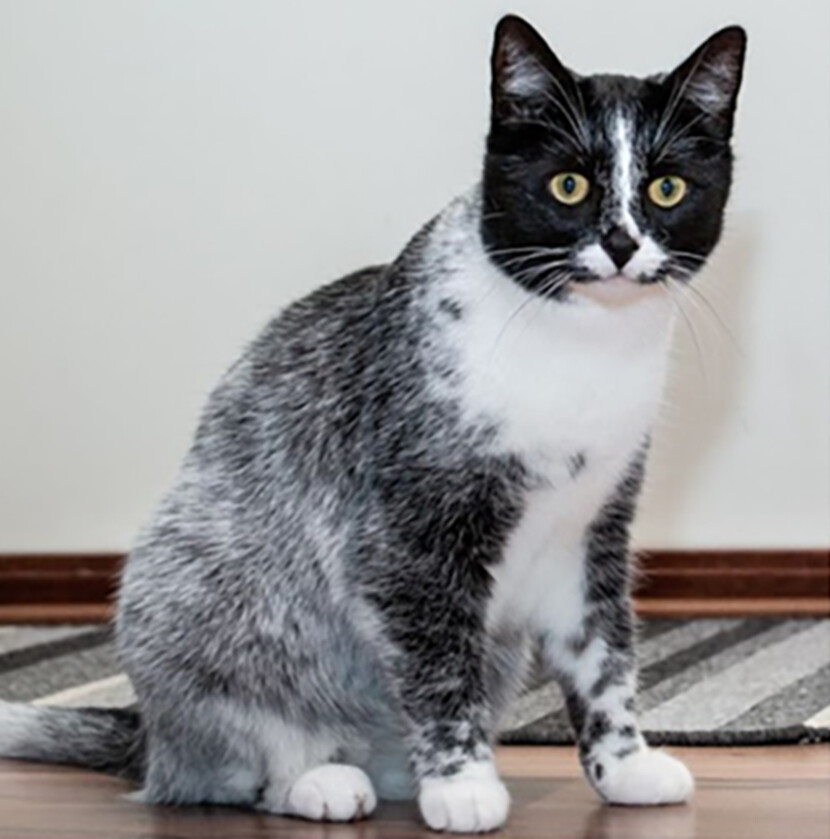
Salmiak; black and white

The KIT gene determines whether or not there will be any white in the coat, except when a solid white coat is caused by albinism, which happens on a different locus (C). White spotting and epistatic white (also known as dominant white) were long thought to be two separate genes (called S and W respectively), but in fact they are both on the KIT gene. The two have been combined into a single white spotting locus (W). White spotting can take many forms of particoloured (bicolour or tricolour) patterns, from a small spot of white to the mostly-white Van pattern of the Turkish Van, while epistatic white produces a completely white cat (solid or self white). The KIT gene W locus has the following alleles:

- W^{D} (or W)=dominant white (solid/self white), autosomal dominant allele. It causes complete white coat colouration by disrupting replication and migration of melanocytes into the skin. The carriers of this allele are white regardless of any other colour-associated gene. It is linked to blue eyes and congenital sensorineural deafness. This deafness is due to a reduction in the population and survival of melanoblast stem cells, which in addition to creating pigment-producing cells, develop into a variety of neurological cell types. White cats with one or two blue eyes have a particularly high likelihood of being deaf. Dominant white is distinct from albinism (c) which results from a mutation in a different gene that has no known impact on hearing.
- w^{S} (or S)=white spotting (particolour: bicolour or tricolour cats), dominant allele. It only disrupts migration of melanocytes to certain patches in the skin, thus leading to the formation of white spots. It exhibits codominance and variable expression:
  - heterozygote (W^{h} or Ss)= low degree of spotting white (less than half white); bicolour/tricolour (about half white) or ventral white (about one quarter white — usually the feet, nose, chest, and belly — colloquially known as "tuxedo"), which is dominant to solid colour.
  - homozygote (W^{l} or SS)= high degree of spotting white (more than half white); dominant harlequin (half to three quarters white) and Van pattern (over three quarters white). The Van pattern is named after the Turkish Van breed, and expresses as colouration limited to the head and tail.
- w (or N)=wild-type or normal (non-white coats), recessive allele. Homozygotes for it won't have any white in their coat.
- w^{g}=Birman white gloving allele (colloquially known as "mitted"), recessive allele.
- w^{sal}=salmiak allele, recessive allele. In addition to a white tuxedo pattern, hairs are coloured at the root fading into white at the tips, except on the head, where they are often coloured all the way through. It originates in Finland and the name salmiak means "salty liquorice".

== Colourpoint and albinism ==
The colourpoint pattern, also known as acromelanism, oculocutaneous albinism (OCA), and the Himalayan coat-colour pattern, is most commonly associated with Siamese cats, but existed long before the breed's creation and is found worldwide in (non-)pedigree domestic cats. The colloquial point terminology depends on its base colour, e.g. black ("seal", "sable", "brown"), lilac ("frost"), and red ("flame").

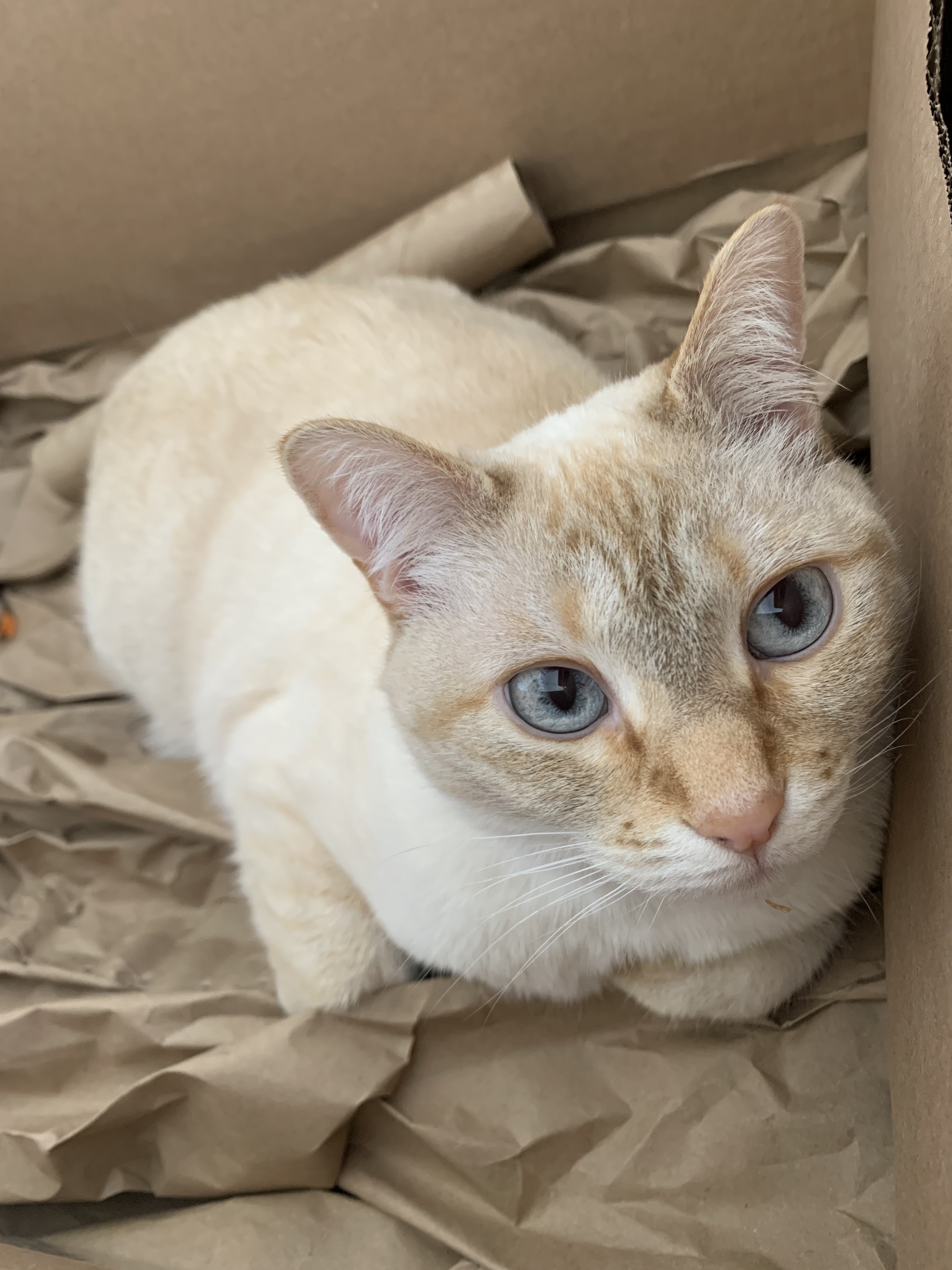
"Flame" point domestic short hair cat lounges in a box. This cat also has tabby markings on its forehead.

A colourpoint cat has dark colours on their extremities –face, ears, feet, and tail– with a lighter version of the same colour on the rest of the body. This pattern is the result of a temperature sensitive mutation causing non-functional form of the tyrosinase (TYR) enzyme in the metabolic pathway from tyrosine to pigment, such as melanin; thus, a congenital lack of pigment production in the skin, except in the extremities or points where the skin is slightly cooler. For this reason, colourpoint cats tend to darken with age as bodily temperature drops; also, the fur may sometimes darken or lighten as a result of temperature change due to illness or significant injury.

More specifically, colourpoint is a type of partial albinism found, together with albinism, on the albino locus (C), which contains the gene TYR (P55033). Although the Siamese colourpoint pattern is the most famous colouration produced by TYR, there are colour mutations at the locus.

- Full colour=C is the wildtype allele resulting in full pigmentation and is completely dominant to all other known alleles at the locus.
- Point=c^{s} is the point allele associated with the Siamese or Himalayan colourpoint pattern.
- Sepia=c^{b} is an allele called sepia (or solid), and is most associated with Burmese cats. It produces a pattern similar to the Siamese/Himalayan colourpoint, but with a much lower contrast and amber-yellow to green eyes.
- Mink=c^{s} and c^{b} are codominant, with c^{b}/c^{s} cats having an intermediate phenotype termed mink, in which the pigment distribution is between sepia and point, and the eye colour is blue-green (aquamarine).
- Mocha=c^{m} is a novel mutation in Burmese cats that results in a colour pattern named "mocha". Its interactions with other alleles have not yet been fully established.
- Albinism=c and c^{2} are two synonymous alleles recessive to all other alleles at the locus that cause albinism. Two distinct alleles causing blue-eyed and pink-eyed albinism respectively have been previously theorised.

The tyrosine pathway also produces neurotransmitters, thus mutations in the early parts of that pathway may affect not only pigment, but also neurological development. This results in a higher frequency of cross-eyes among colourpoint cats, as well as the high frequency of cross-eyes in white tigers.

Comparison of albinism and different black (seal, sable) colourpoint (partial albinism) cats

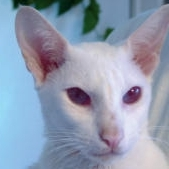
Albinism

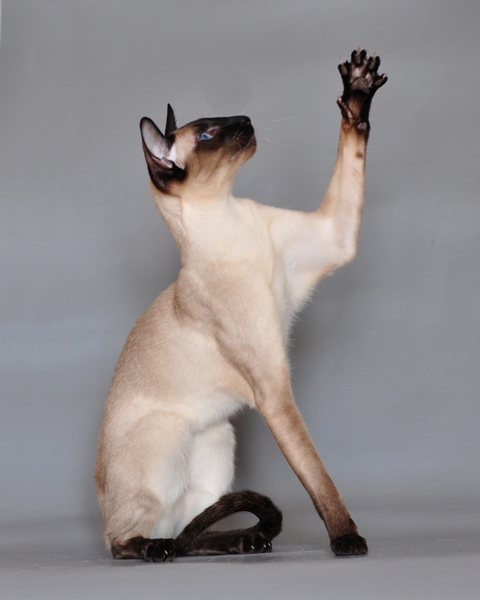
Black point Siamese

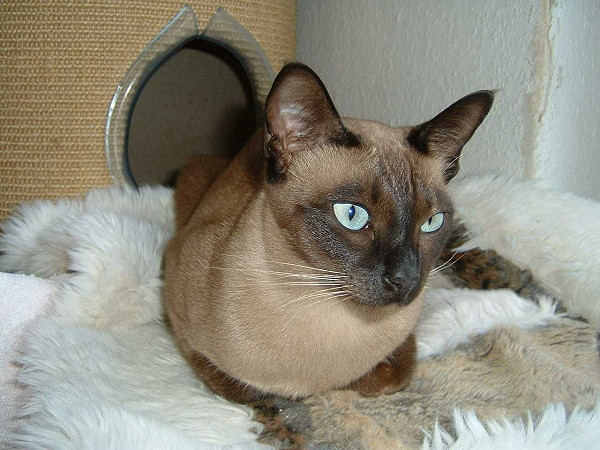
Black mink Tonkinese

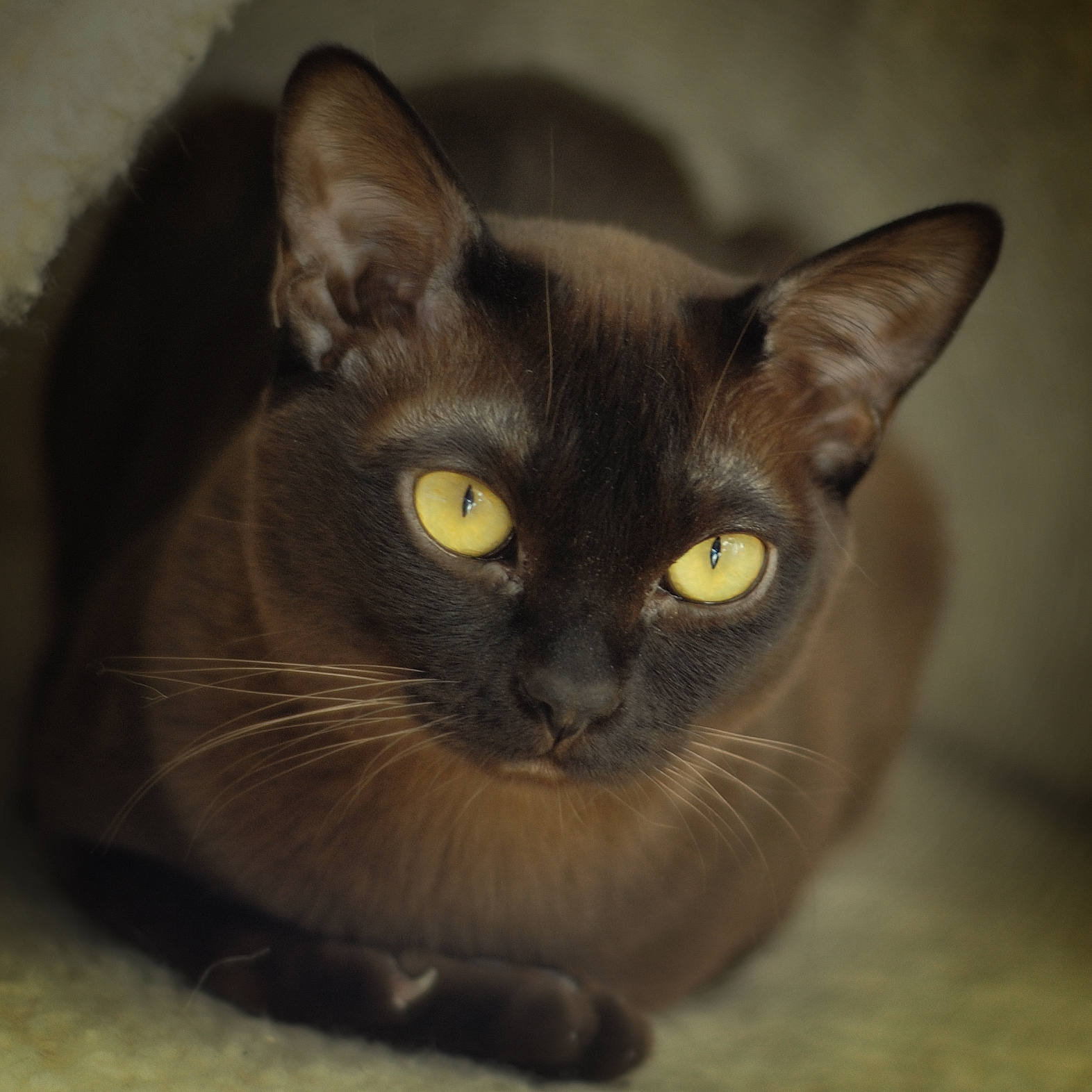
Black sepia Burmese

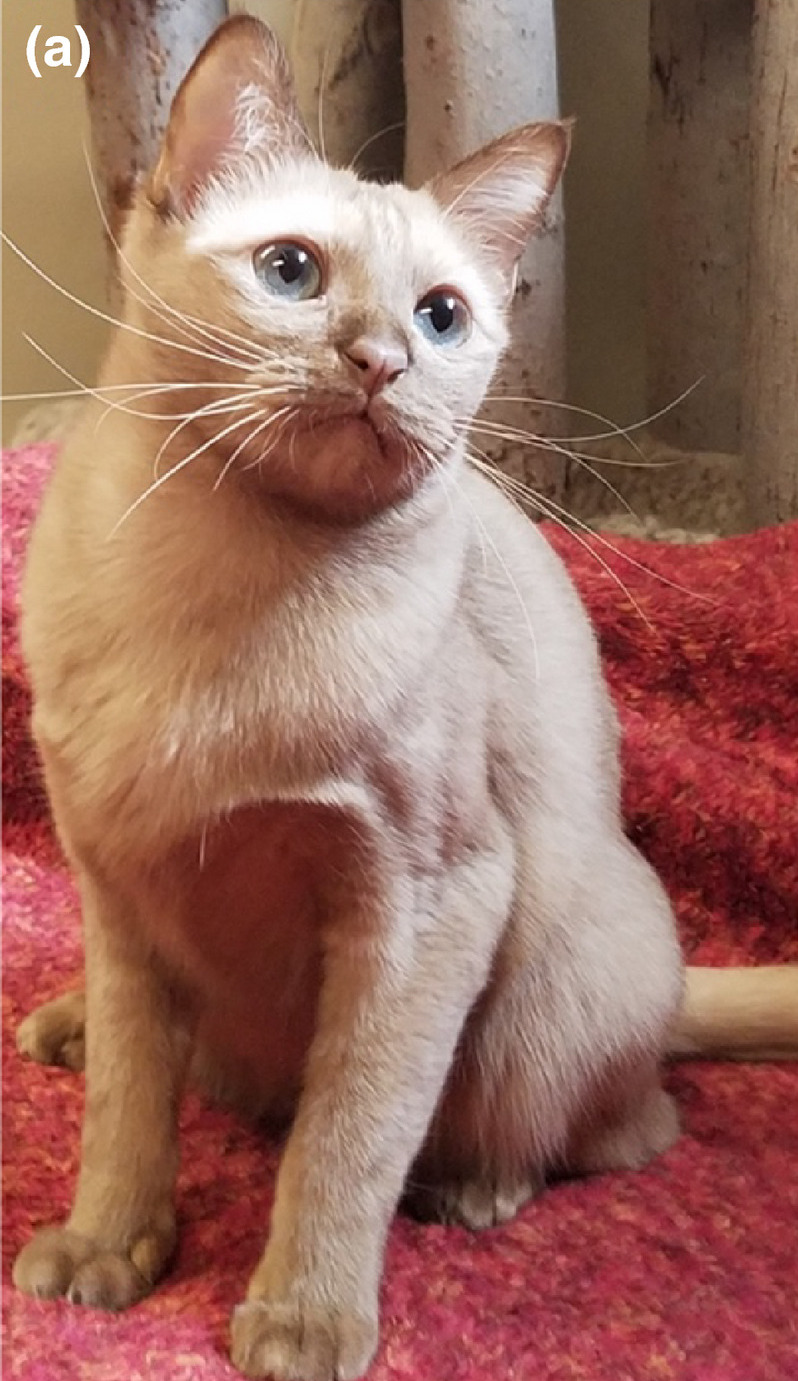
Black mocha

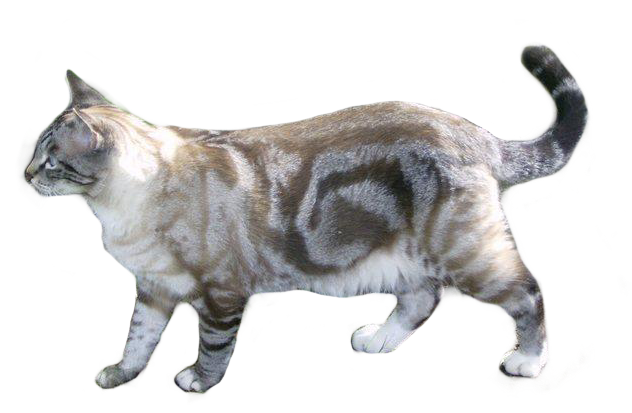
Black blotched tabby (US: 'lynx') point

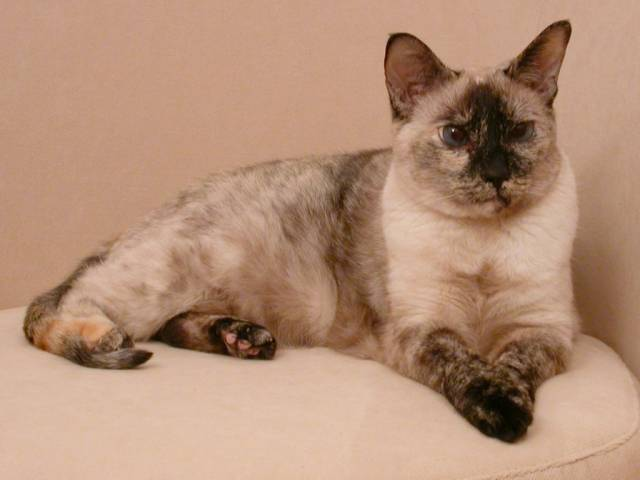
Black tortoiseshell point

== Silver and golden series ==
Agouti hair of a brown tabby with phaeomelanin (red pigment) and eumelanin (black or brown pigment).

=== Silver series ===
The silver series is caused by the melanin inhibitor gene I/i. The dominant form causes melanin production to be suppressed, but it affects phaeomelanin (warm red pigment) much more than eumelanin (black or brown pigment). On tabbies, this turns the background colour into a sparkling cold silver tone. The dark hairs that make the tabby pattern will be silvery-white at their roots, whilst leaving the pigmentation at the tip of these hairs intact, resulting in a cold-toned silver tabby. On solid cats, it turns the base of the hair throughout their coat into a depigmented pale silvery-white, whilst the tip stays pigmented, making them (silver) smoke. The term cameo is commonly used for red silver and cream silver (inhibitor gene (I-O-)) coloured coats in cats.

=== Wide-band factors ===
Silver agouti cats can have a range of silver tabby phenotypes depending on the depigmentation ratio of the hair root to tip; from regular silver tabby (over half the hair is pigmented), to the more extreme silver tabby forms of silver shaded (under half the hair is pigmented, approx. 1/3 of hair length), and silver tipped also called 'chinchilla' or 'shell' (only the very tip of the hair is pigmented, approx. 1/8 of hair length). This seems to be affected by hypothetical wide-band factors, which make the silver band at the base of the hair wider in silver tabbies and smokes. Breeders often notate wide-band as a single gene Wb/wb, but it is most likely a polygenic trait.

Smoke / silver tabby

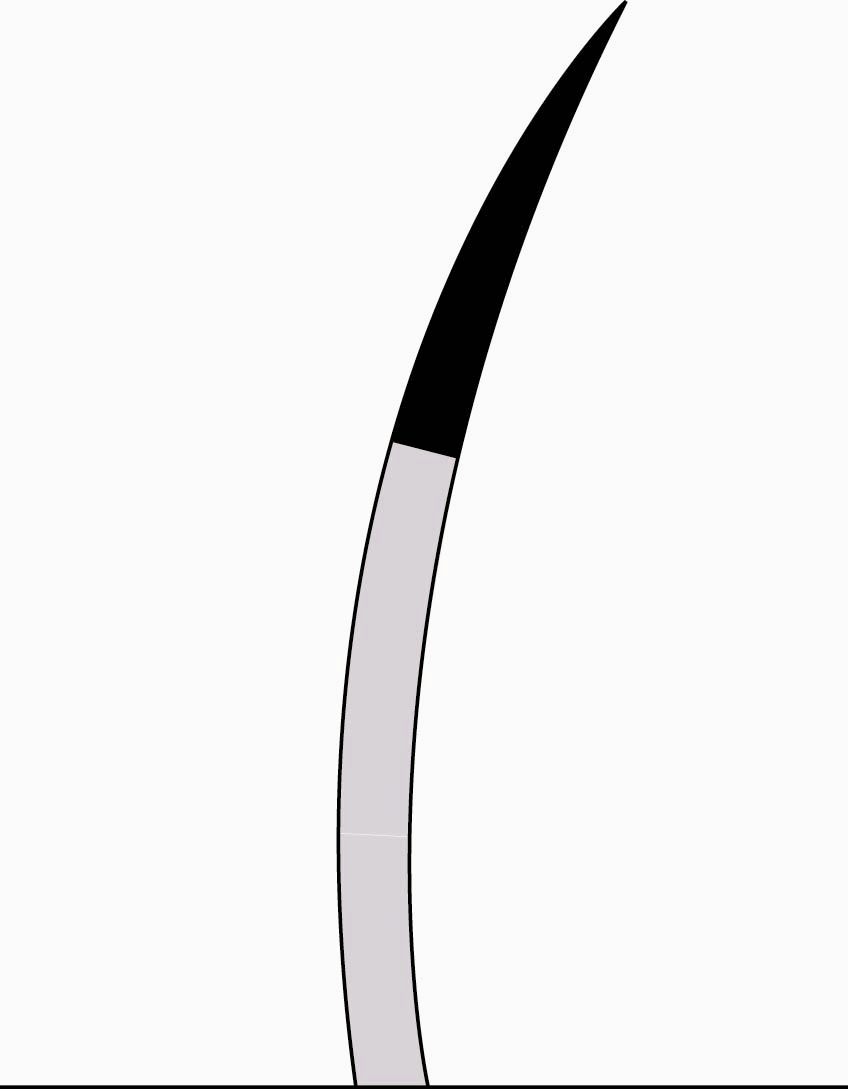
Shaded – 1/3

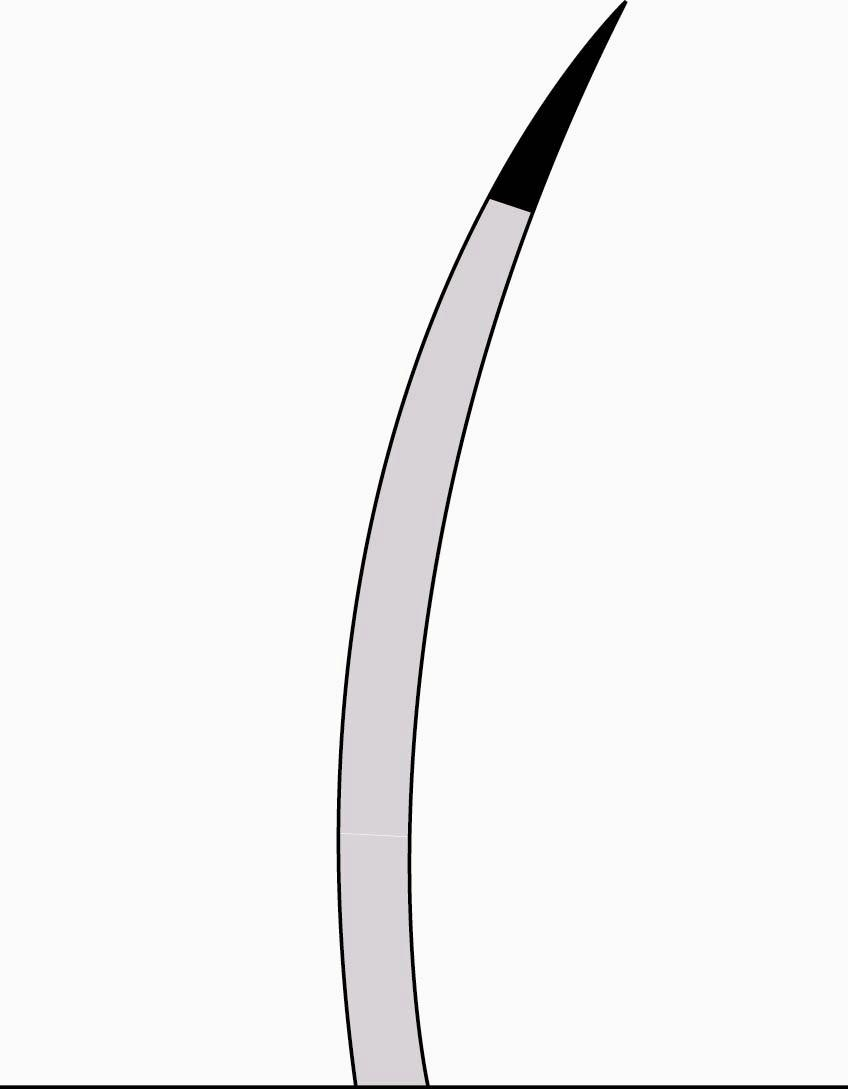
Tipped – 1/8 ("chinchilla" / "shell")

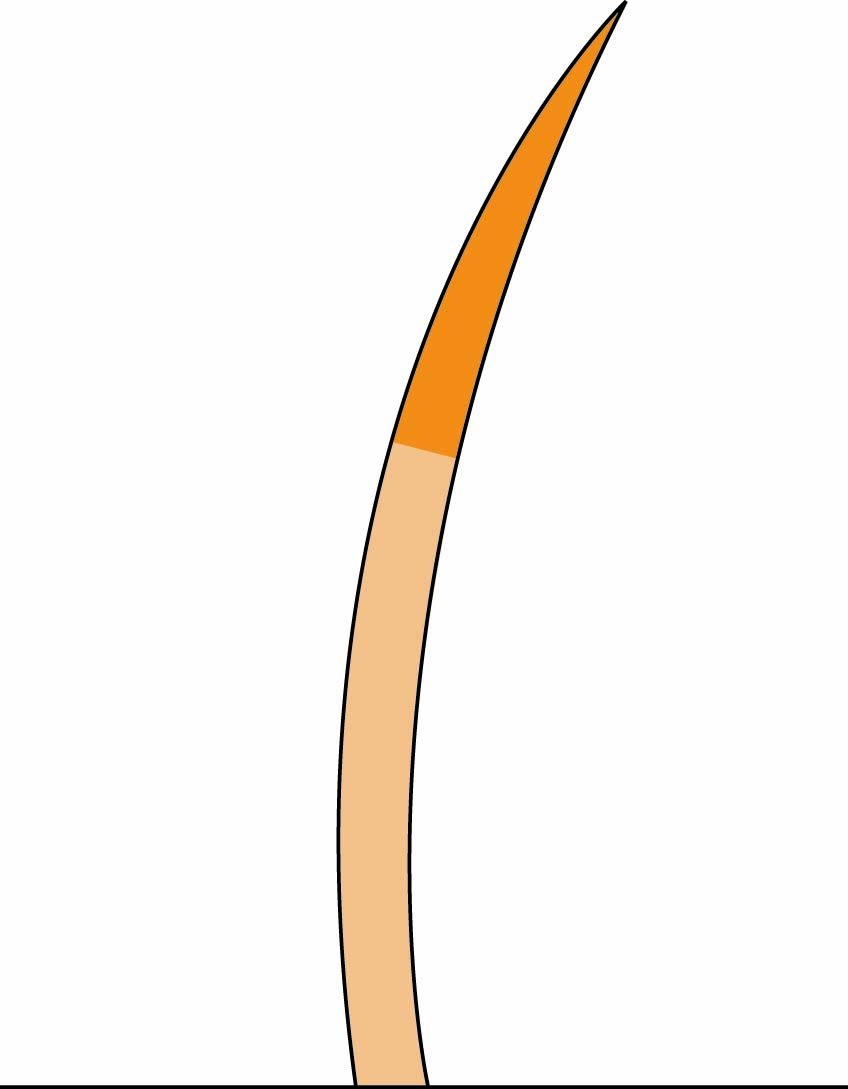
red or cream silver ("cameo")

=== Golden series ===
If a cat has the wide-band trait but no silver melanin inhibitor, the band will be golden instead of silver. These cats are known as golden tabbies, or in Siberian cats as sunshine tabbies. The golden colour is caused by the CORIN gene. Shaded golden and tipped golden are also possible, in the same hair length distribution as the silver-gene. However, there is no golden smoke, because the combination of wide-band and non-agouti simply produces a solid cat.

=== Wide-band expression ===
The genetics involved in producing the ideal tabby, tipped, shaded, or smoke cat is complex. Not only are there many interacting genes, but genes sometimes do not express themselves fully, or conflict with one another. For example, the silver melanin inhibitor gene in some instances does not block pigment, resulting in a greyer undercoat, or in tarnishing (yellowish or rusty fur). The greyer undercoat is considered less desirable to fanciers.

Likewise, poorly-expressed non-agouti or over-expression of melanin inhibitor will cause a pale, washed out black smoke. Various polygenes (sets of related genes), epigenetic factors, or modifier genes, as yet unidentified, are believed to result in different phenotypes of colouration, some deemed more desirable than others by fanciers.

The genetic influences on tipped or shaded cats are:

- Agouti gene.
- Tabby pattern genes (such as T^{a} masking the tabby pattern).
- Silver/melanin inhibitor gene I/i.
- Golden CORIN gene.
- Factors affecting the number and width of bands of colour on each hair, such as the hypothetical wide-band gene wb. Resulting in shaded or tipped (chinchilla/shell) pigmentation.
- Factors affecting the amount and quality of eumelanin and/or phaeomelanin pigment expression (such as the theorised rufousing factors)
- Genes causing sparkling appearance (such as glitter in the Bengal, satin in the Tennessee Rex, grizzle in the Chausie).
- Factors to clear up residual striping (hypothetical Chaos, Confusion, Unconfused, Erase, and Roan factors).
Silver series

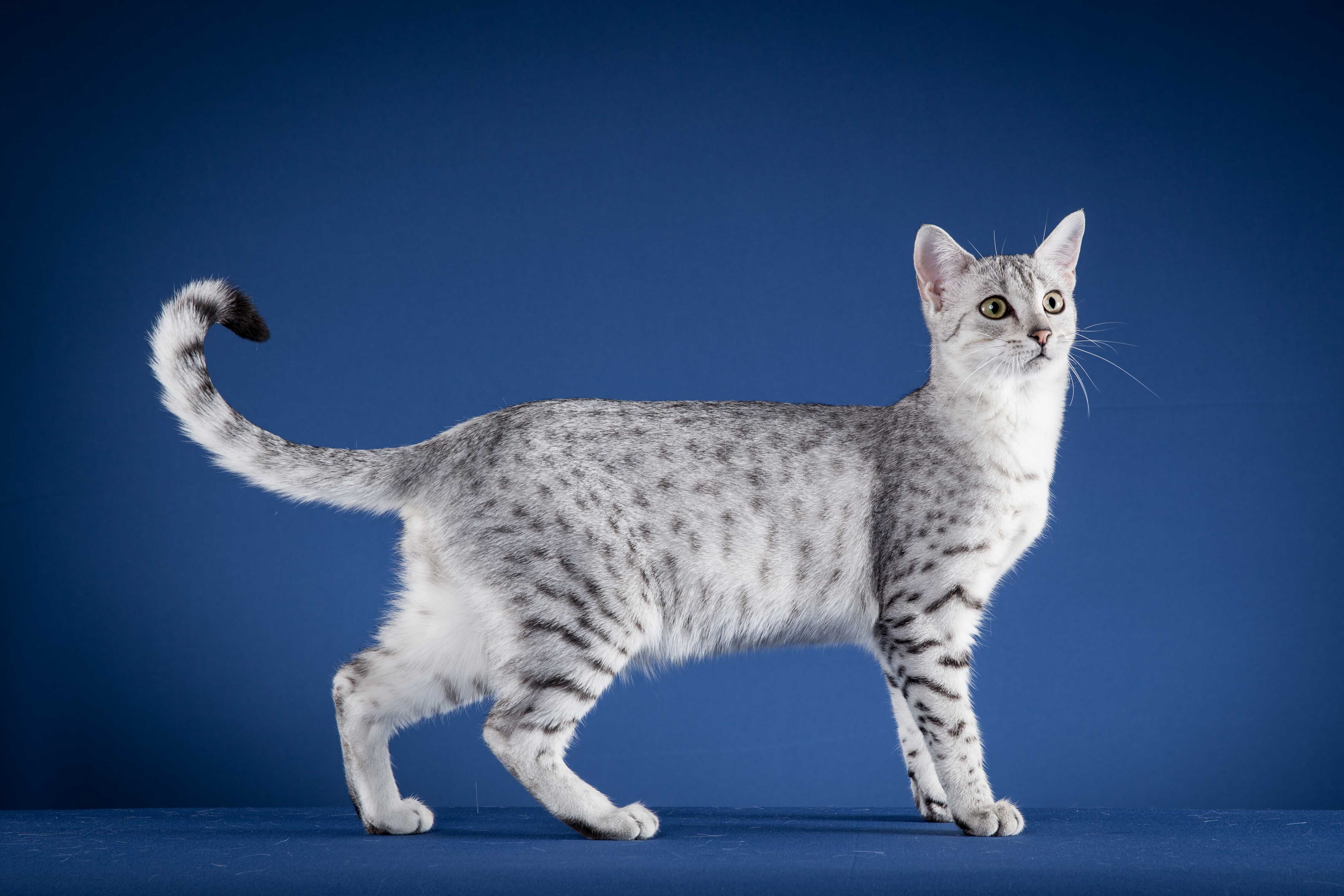
Black silver spotted tabby Egyptian Mau.

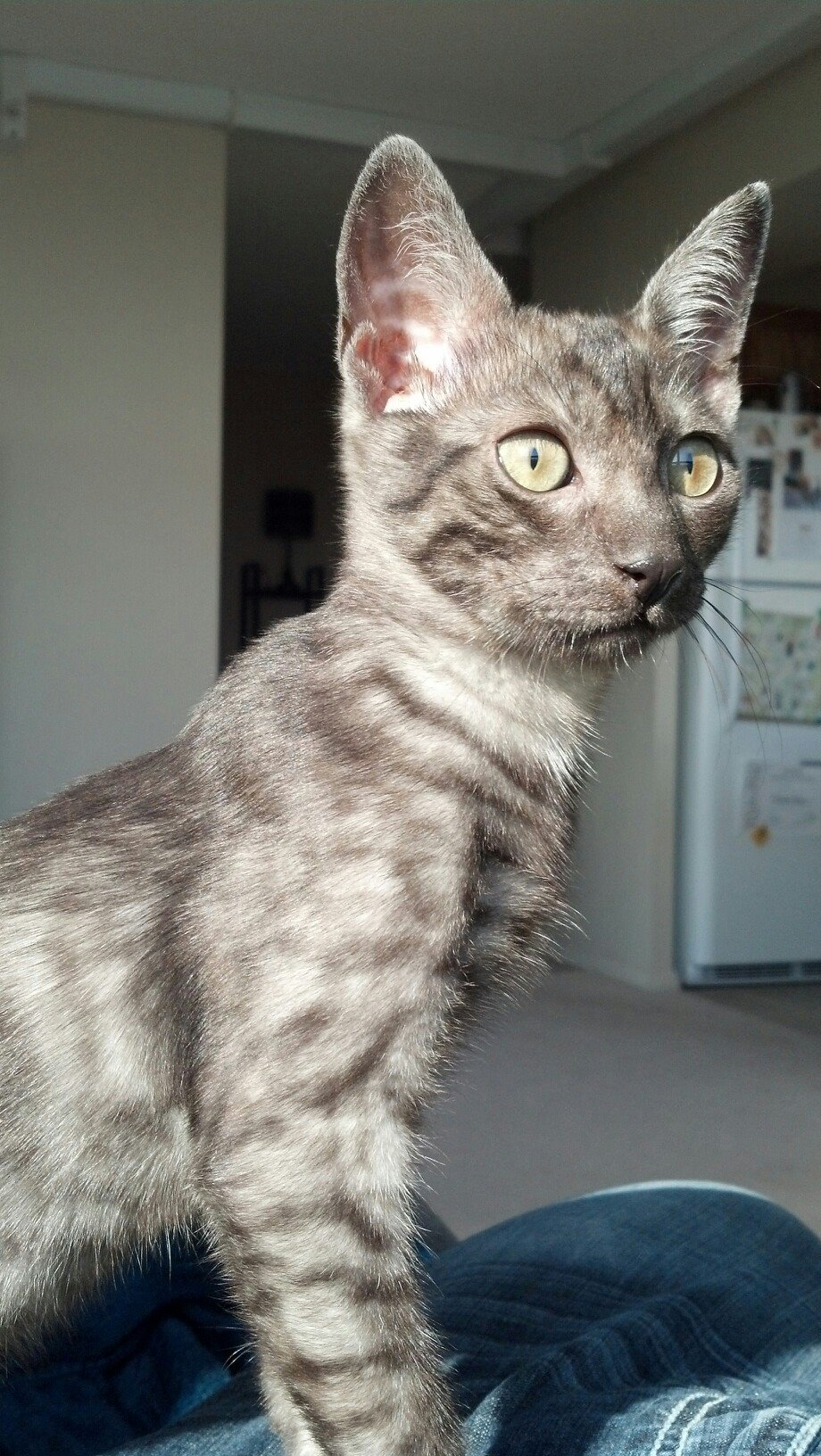
Black smoke Egyptian Mau with 'ghost markings'

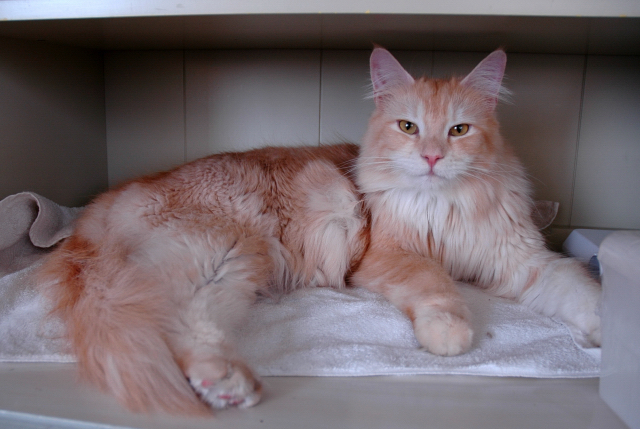
Red silver ("cameo") shaded Maine Coon.

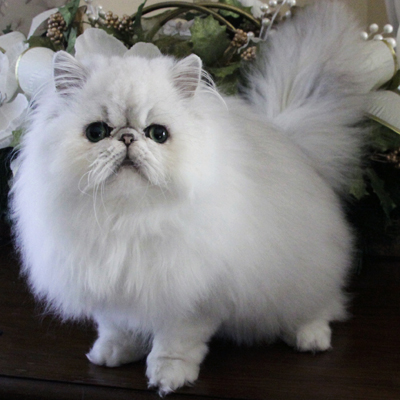
Black silver tipped ("chinchilla") Persian.

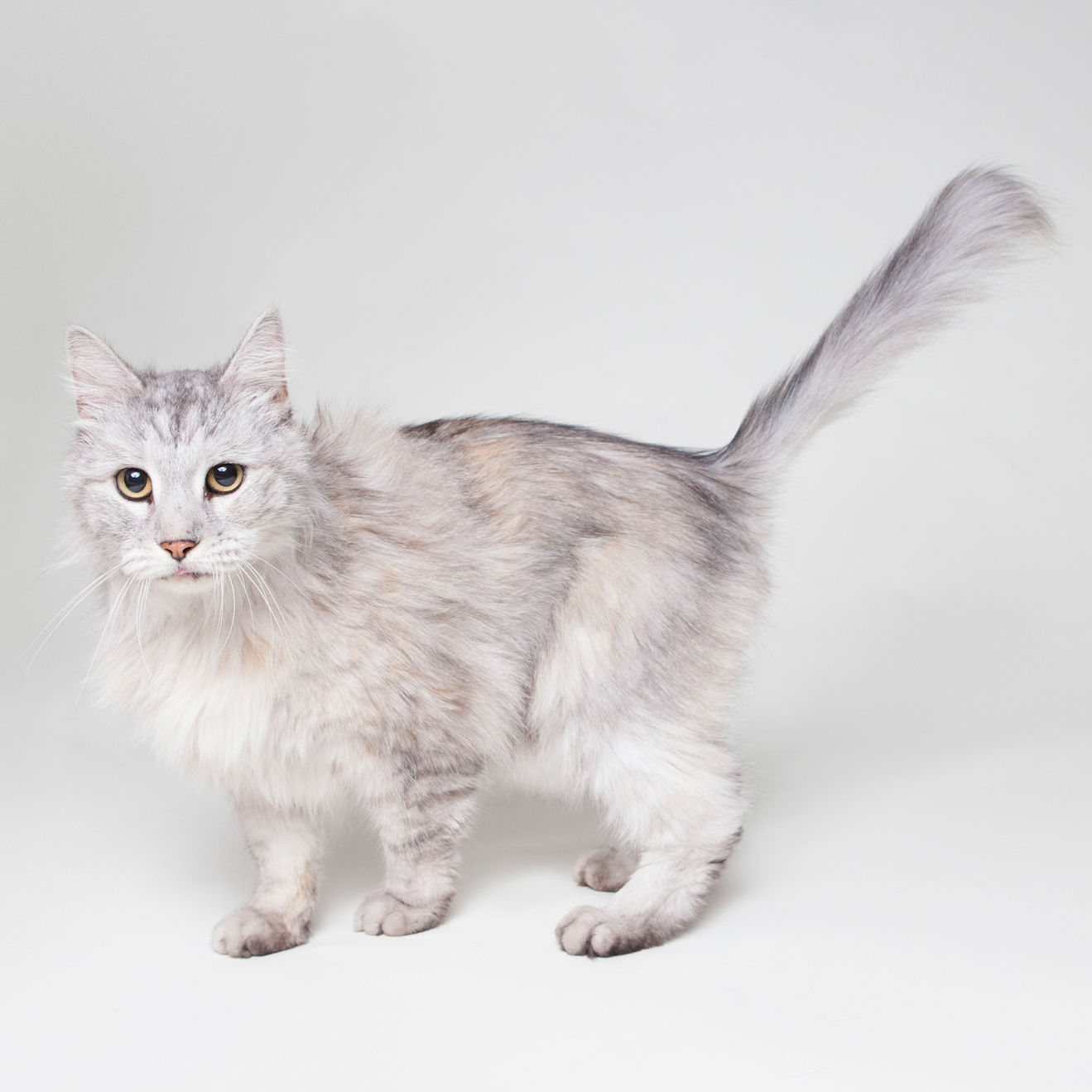
Black tortoiseshell silver shaded Domestic Longhair.
Golden series

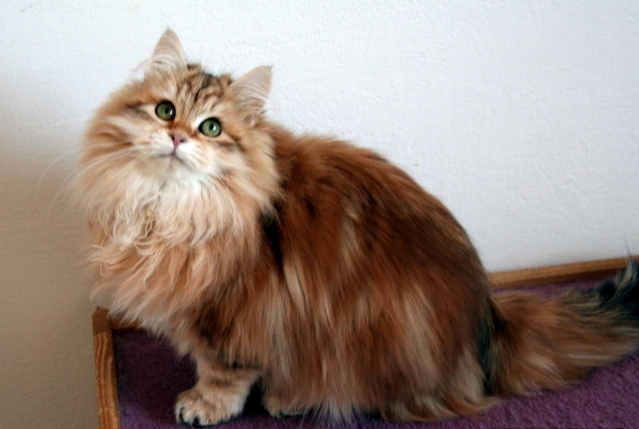
Sunshine blotched tabby Siberian Cat.

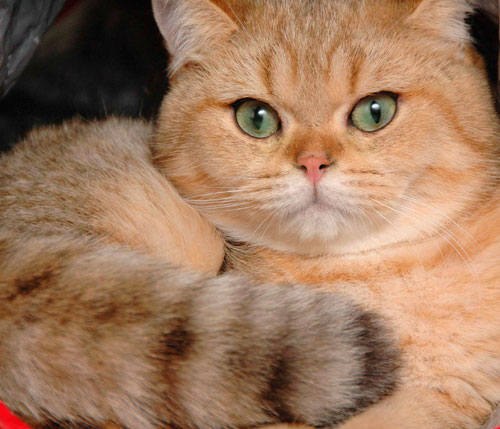
Black golden ticked tabby British Shorthair.

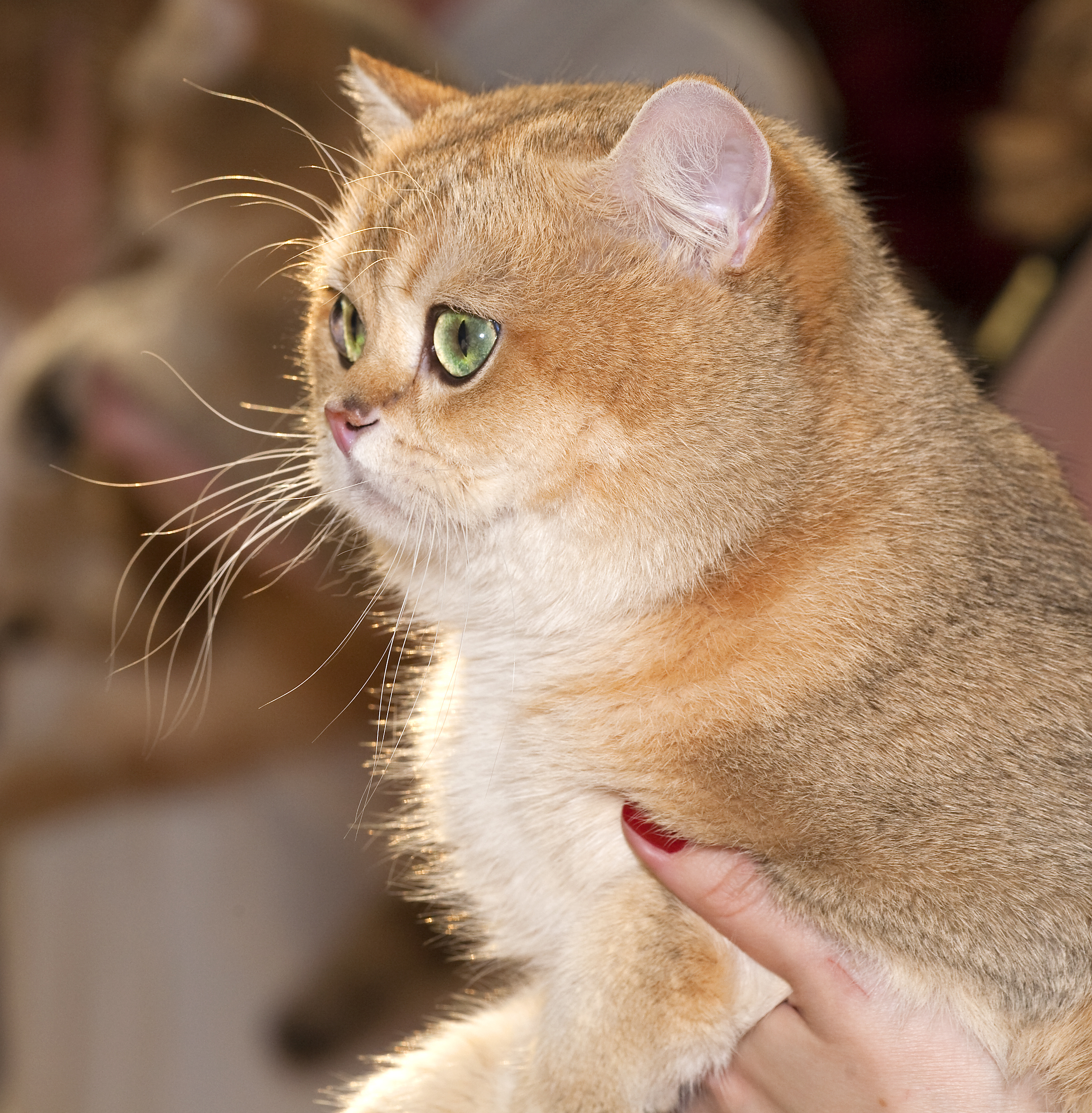
Black golden ticked tabby British Shorthair.

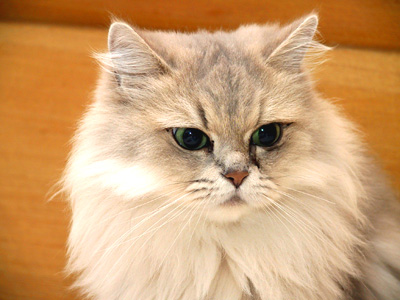
Blue golden tipped ("chinchilla") Persian.

== Fever coat ==
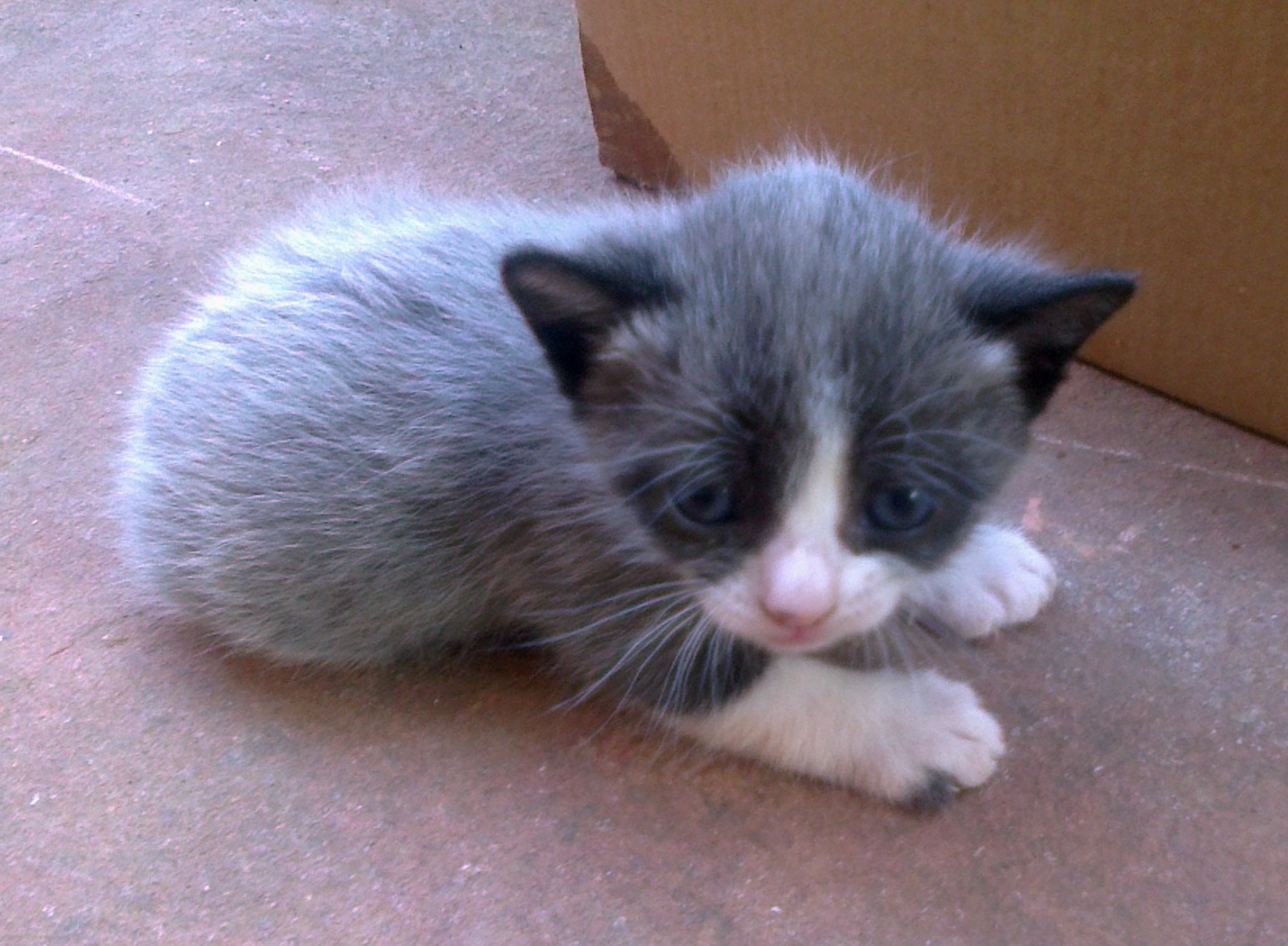
Black and white bicolour kitten with fever coat expression over the black fur

Fever coat is a non-permanent depigmentation effect known in domestic cats, where a female cat experiences health implications during pregnancy (e.g. has a fever or is stressed), causing her unborn kittens' fur to develop a frosty silver-type colour (silver-grey, cream, or reddish) rather than what the kitten's genetics would normally show. The depigmentation is most prominent at the hair tips, rather than the roots as would be the case in actual silver coats. After birth, the frost-like fur is replaced naturally by fur in their actual genetic colours during a moult in their first year; in most cases the full colour is completely grown in at 6–8 months old.

== Fur length and texture ==
=== Cat coat hair ===
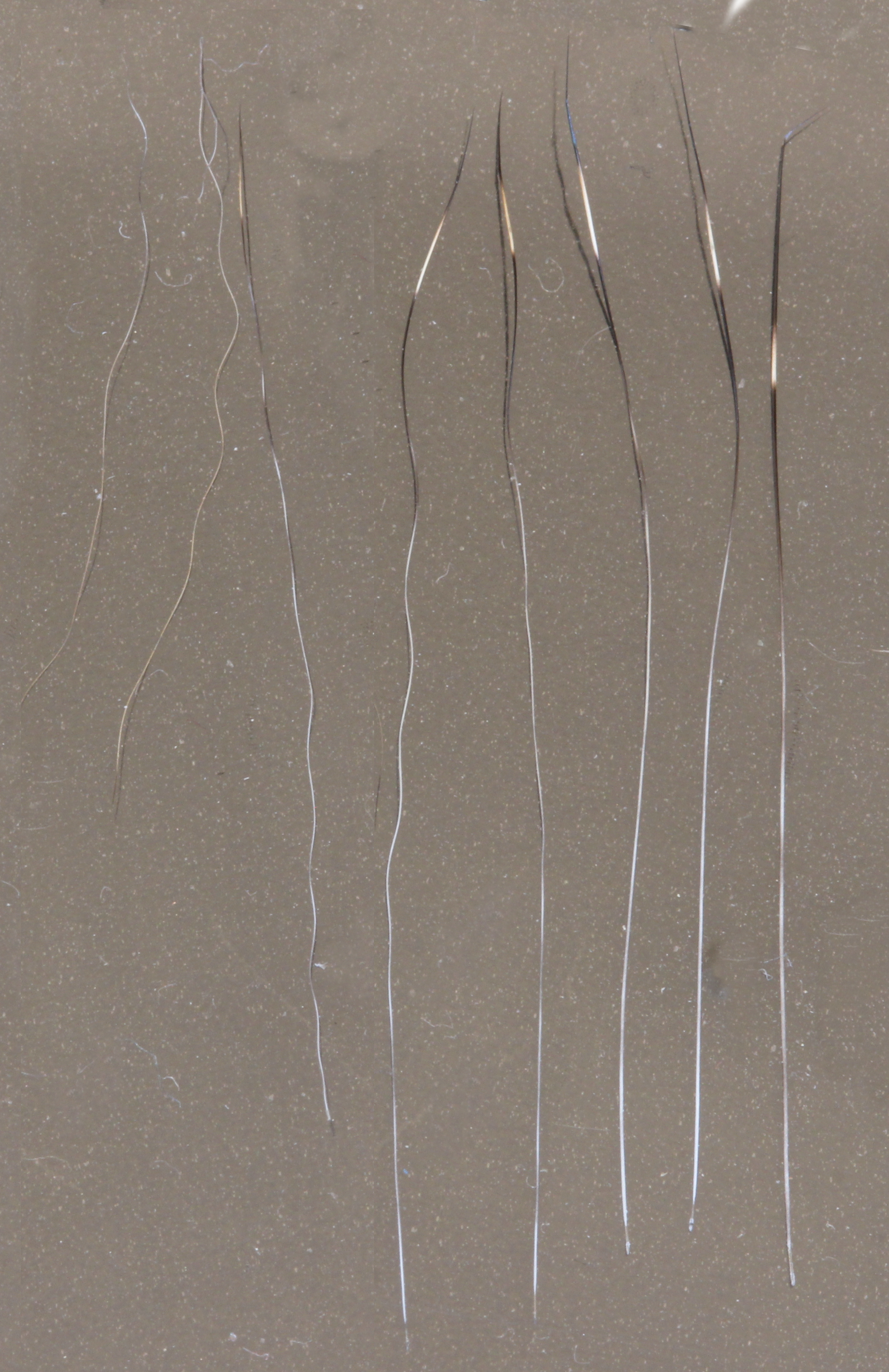
Down, awn and guard hairs of a domestic tabby cat

Cat fur can be short, long, curly, or hairless. Most cats are short-haired, like their wild ancestor. The fur can naturally come in three types of hairs; guard, awn, and down hair. The length, density and proportions of these three hairs varies greatly between breeds, and in some cats only one or two types are found.

Most oriental breeds only express one single layer of silky coat. However, cats can also have double-layered coats out of two hair types in which the down hairs form the soft, insulating undercoat, and the guard hairs form the protective outer coat.

A typical cat coat exists of all three natural hair types, but due to the equal lengths of two of these hairs, the coat is still considered double-layered. Typically, the down hairs comprise the undercoat while the guard and awn hairs make up the basic top coat. Double-coated cats with thick undercoats require daily grooming as these coats are more prone to matting. Double coats are found in for example the Persian, British Shorthair, Maine Coon and Norwegian Forest Cat.

Additionally, there even exist cats which express all three natural types of cat hair in different lengths and structures, which form three different layers. These cats are called triple-coated. Siberians and Neva Masquerades are known for their unique triple coats, which provided their landrace ancestors with extra insulation to withstand their arctic habitat.

=== Coat mutations ===
There have been many genes identified that result in unusual cat fur. These genes have been discovered in random-bred and purebred cats worldwide, and are sometimes selectively bred into new breeds or breed varieties. Some of the genes are in danger of going extinct because the cats are not sold beyond the region where the mutation originated or there is simply not enough demand for cats expressing the mutation.

In many breeds, coat gene mutations are perceived as unfavourable. An example is the rex allele which appeared in Maine Coons in the early 1990s in Germany, the UK and the US.

==== Fur length ====
Cat fur length is governed by the Length gene in which the dominant form, L, codes for short hair, and the recessive l codes for long hair. In the longhaired cat, the transition from anagen (hair growth) to catagen (cessation of hair growth) is delayed due to this mutation. A rare recessive shorthair gene has been observed in some lines of (silver) Persian where two longhaired parents have produced shorthaired offspring.

The Length gene has been identified as the fibroblast growth factor 5 (FGF5; M3X9S6) gene. The dominant allele codes for the short coat is seen in most cats. Long coats are coded for by at least four different recessively inherited mutations, the alleles of which have been identified. The most ubiquitous is found in most or all long haired breeds while the remaining three are found only in Ragdolls, Norwegian Forest Cats, and Maine Coons.

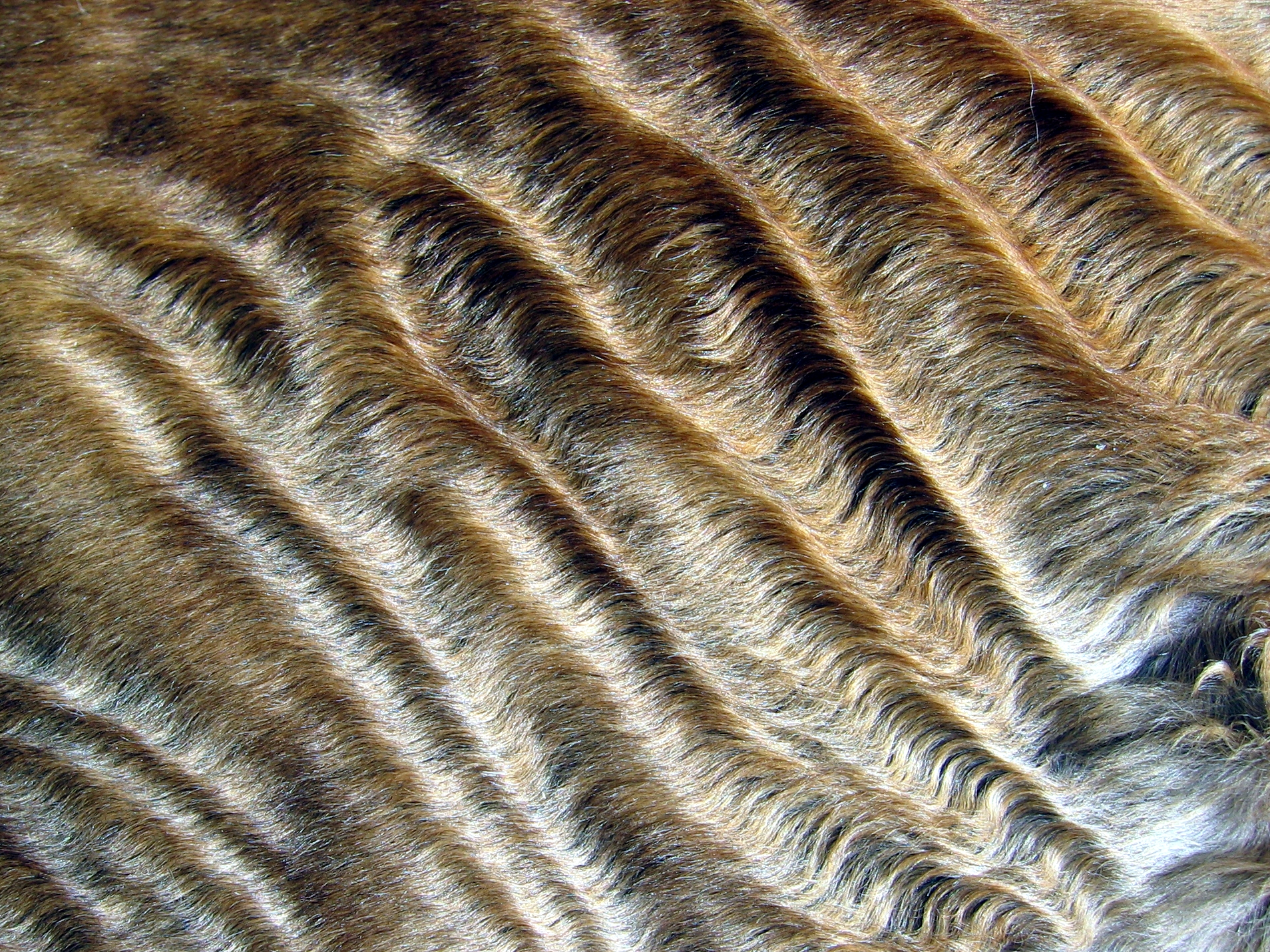
Wavy fur of a Devon Rex cat

==== Curly-coated ====
There are various genes producing curly-coated or "rex" cats. New types of rex arise spontaneously in random-bred cats now and then. Some of the rex genes that breeders have selected for are:

- Devon Rex
  - Mutation in KRT71 (E1AB55), the same gene causing hairlessness in Sphynx cats. re is an allele completely recessive to the wildtype and completely dominant to hr found in Sphynx.
- Cornish Rex
  - Mutation in LPAR6 (A0A5F5XLZ8). A completely recessive allele termed r.
- Ural Rex
  - Mutation in LIPH.
- German Rex
  - Provisionally an allele termed gr. Same locus as Cornish, but proposed as a different allele. However, most breeders consider the German Rex to have r/r genotype.
- Oregon Rex (extinct)
  - A hypothetical recessive allele termed ro.
- Selkirk Rex
  - A dominant allele termed Se, although sometimes described as an incomplete dominant because the three possible allele pairings relate to three different phenotypes: heterozygous cats (Se/se) may have a fuller coat that is preferred in the show ring, while homozygous cats (Se/Se) may have a tighter curl and less coat volume. (se/se type cats have a normal coat.) This phenomenon may also colloquially be referred to as additive dominance.
- LaPerm
  - Provisional completely dominant Lp allele.

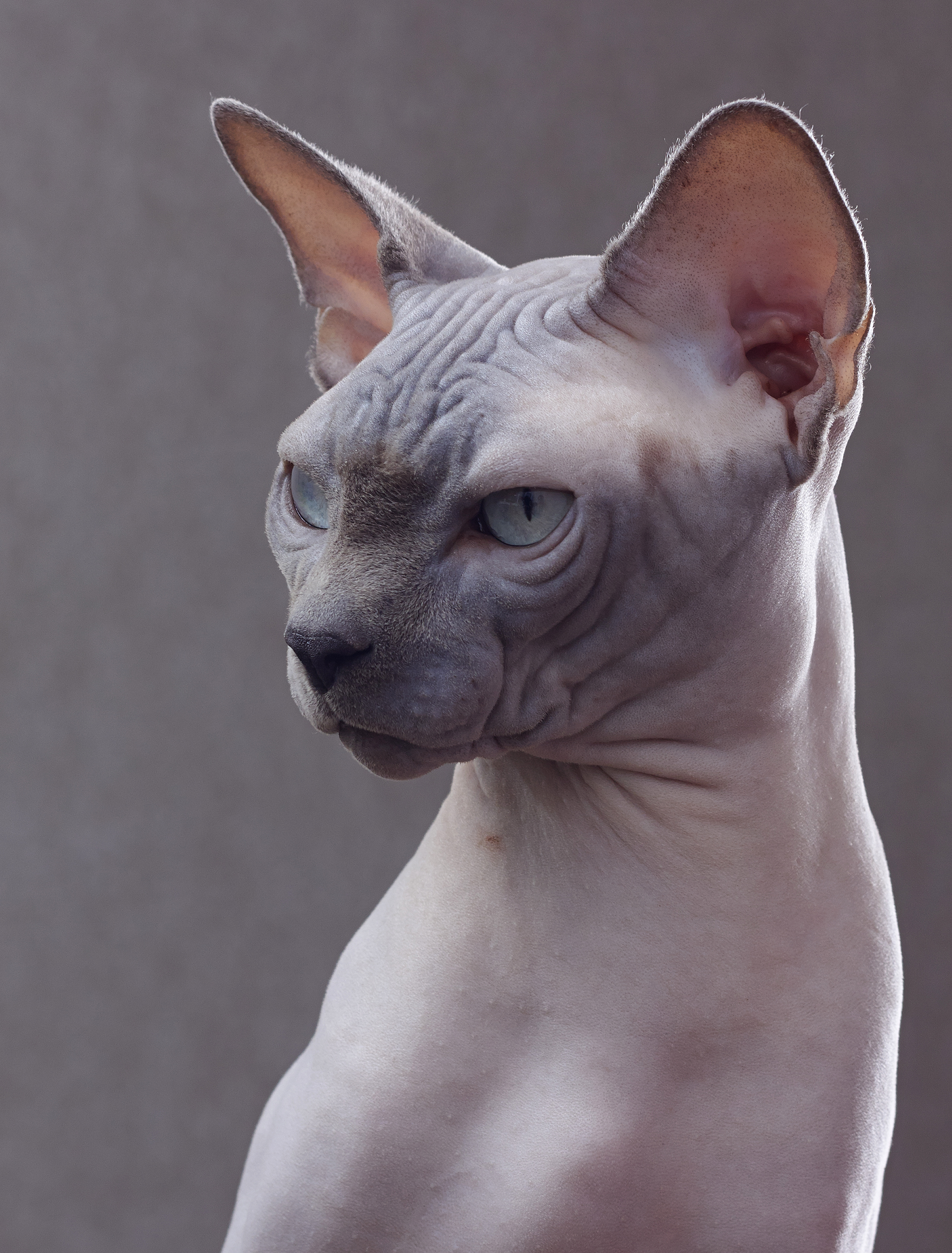
Hairless cats, like this Sphynx, are often born even without whiskers

==== Hairlessness ====
There are also genes for hairlessness:

- h=French hairless cat, recessive.
- hd=British hairless cat, recessive.
- Hp=Russian Donskoy and Peterbald, dominant.
- hr=Sphynx cat, recessive. Identified on KRT71.

Some rex cats are prone to temporary hairlessness, known as baldness, during moulting.

Here are a few other genes resulting in unusual fur:

- The Wh gene (dominant, possibly incomplete) results in Wirehair cats. They have bent or crooked hair producing springy, crinkled fur.
- A hypothetical Yuc gene, or York Chocolate undercoat gene, results in cats with no undercoat. However, the proportional relationship between guard, awn, and down hair production varies greatly between all breeds.
- A recessive autosomal gene for Onion hair which causes roughness and swelling on the hairs. The swelling is due to enlargement of the inner core of medulla cells.
- A recessive autosomal gene spf for sparse fur. As well as sparse coat, the hairs are thin, straggly and contorted and there is brown exudate around the eyes and nose and on the chest and stomach. A similar condition is linked to Ornithine Transcarbamylase Deficiency in mice.

== Loci for coat colour, type and length ==
Gene	Locus Name	Locus Symbols	Allele Variants	Description
ASIP	Agouti	A	A, A^{Pb}, a	Agouti/tabby, charcoal (cat hybrids, i.e. Bengal and Savannah breeds), recessive black/solid
LVRN / Taqpep	Tabby Pattern	Ta	Ta^{M}, Ta^{b}	Mackerel, classic/blotched
DKK4	Ticked Tabby	Ti	Ti^{A},Ti^{+}	(Epistatic to tabby) heterozygote ticked, homozygote ticked (see Abyssinian)
--	Spotted Modifier	Sp	Sp, sp	(Modifier to tabby) spotted tabby, no modification
TYRP1	Brown	B	B, b, b^{l}	Black, brown/chocolate, cinnamon
ARHGAP36	Orange	O	X^{O}, X^{o}, Y	Red, black, tortoiseshell (sex-linked epistatic)
MLPH	Dilution	D	D, d	Diluted colour (black→blue, chocolate→lilac, cinnamon→fawn, red→cream), no effect
--	Dilute Modifier	Dm	D^{M}, d^{M}	Diluted colour modified (blue/lilac/fawn→caramel, cream→apricot), no effect
--	Barrington Brown	Ba	Ba, ba	Diluted brown (black=mahogany, chocolate=light brown, cinnamon=pale coffee), no effect; Unverified gene
TYR	Colourpoint	C	C, c^{b}, c^{s}, c^{m}, c^{2}, c	Full colour, point, mink, sepia, mocha, blue eye albino, red eye albino
KIT	White	W	W, w^{s}, w, w^{g}, w^{sal}	Solid white, white spotting, white gloving, salmiak, no white
--	Inhibitor	I	I, i	Silver, non-silver
CORIN	Wide-Band	wb	-, wb	Tabby agouti, shaded, tipped, smoke, silver, golden, "sunshine" (Siberian)
MC1R	Extension	E	E, e, e^{r}, e^{c}	Normal, amber (Norwegian Forest Cat), russet (Burmese), copal (Kurilian Bobtail)
FgF5	Long hair	L	L, l (M1, M2, M3, M4, M5)	Short, long (Ragdoll, Norwegian Forest Cat, Maine Coon, most longhair breeds)
KRT71	Curly Coat	Re	Se, se/Re, re, hr	Curly coat (Selkirk Rex), normal hair, curly coat (Devon Rex), hairlessness (Sphynx)
LPAR6	Rex (Cornish)	R	R, r	Normal hair, curly coat (Cornish Rex)

== See also ==
- Barr body
- Bicolour cat
- Deaf white cat
- Dog coat genetics
- Equine coat color genetics
- Maltese cat
- Acromelanism
