= Salmiak cat =

Cat coat color

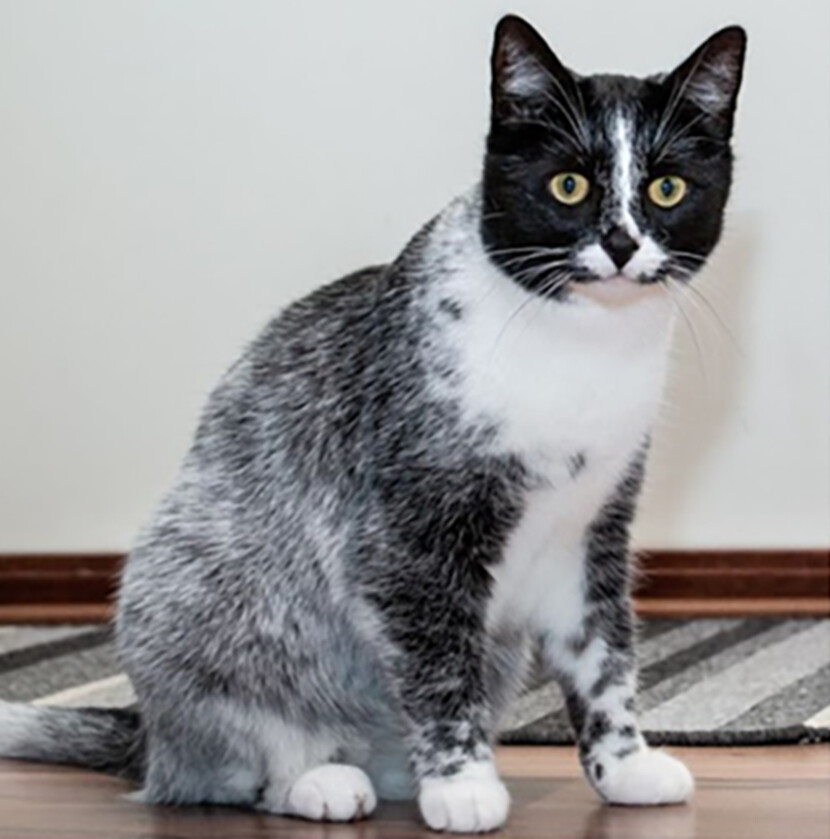
An example of the salmiak pattern on a bicolour cat

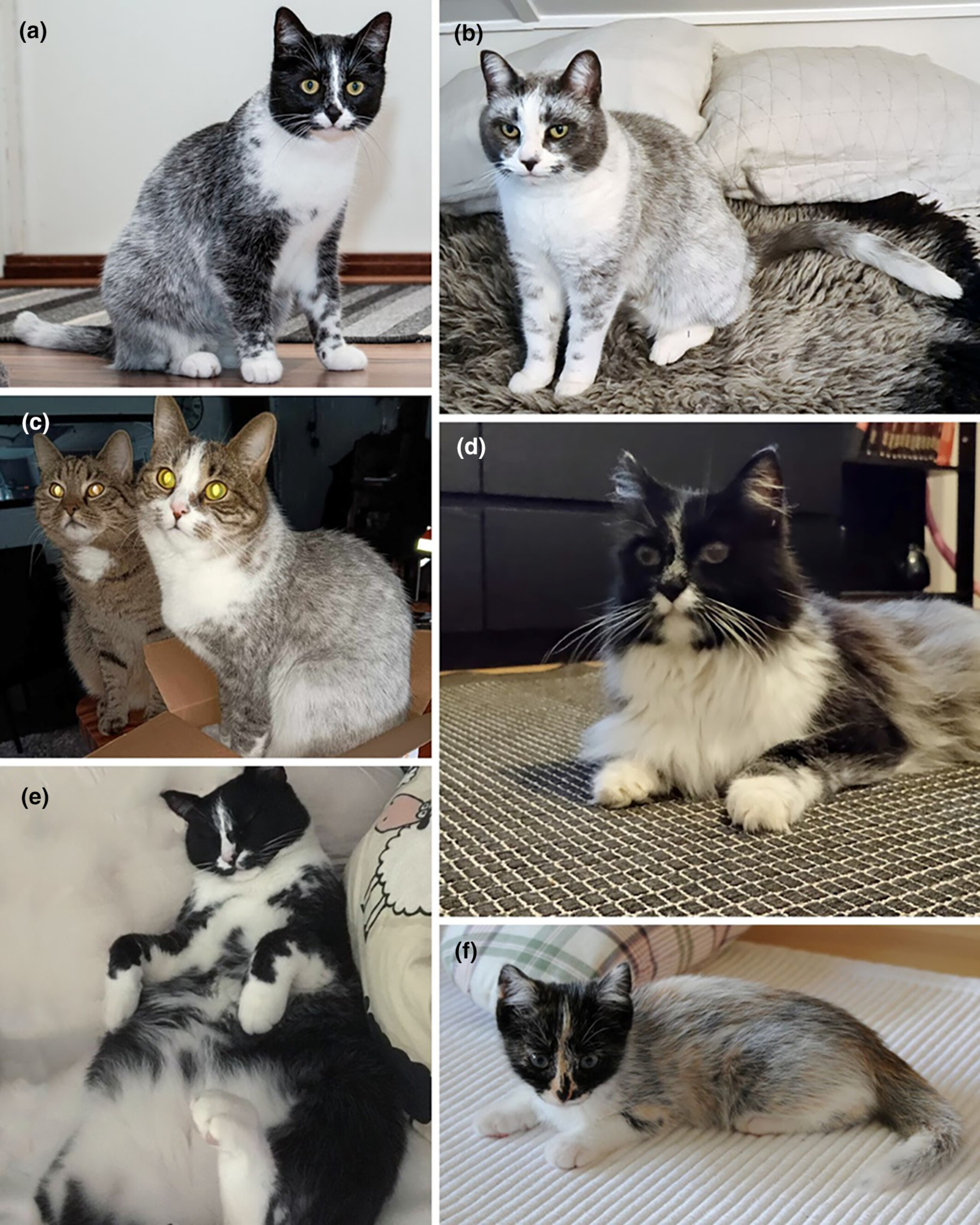
Examples of salmiak patterns

A salmiak cat is a domestic cat of any breed which have a distinct coat colour called the salmiak fur pattern, salty liquorice, or Finnish mutation. The most commonly used name for the coat colour, "salmiak", is derived from the Finnish word for salty liquorice, as the appearance of the pattern on a tuxedo cat is black with flecks of white, resembling salty liquorice. The pattern can also occur along with other patterns, such as brown tabby or tortoiseshell, and occurs in both male and female cats.

This coat colour was originally documented by Finnish researchers in 2024, with sightings in central Finland documented as early as 2007. It is noted to be caused by a recessive allele at the KIT gene, similar to many other white patterns on cats and other domestic animals. Cats with the pattern have green or yellow eyes.
