= FGF5 =

Mammalian protein found in Homo sapiens

Identifiers
- Aliases: FGF5, HBGF-5, Smag-82, TCMGLY, fibroblast growth factor 5
- External IDs: OMIM: 165190; MGI: 95519; GeneCards: FGF5

Gene location (Human)
Chr.	Chromosome 4 (human)
Band	4q21.21	Start	80,266,639 bp
Band	4q21.21	End	80,336,680 bp

Gene location (Mouse)
Chr.	Chromosome 5 (mouse)
Band	5 E3|5 47.77 cM	Start	98,402,043 bp
Band	5 E3|5 47.77 cM	End	98,424,889 bp
RNA expression pattern
Bgee	Human / Mouse (ortholog); Top expressed in: buccal mucosa cell; stromal cell of endometrium; testicle; cerebellar cortex; cerebellar hemisphere; right hemisphere of cerebellum; gallbladder; gastric mucosa; skin of thigh; internal globus pallidus / Top expressed in: embryo; myotome; epiblast; hair follicle; embryo; auditory system; spiral ganglion; primitive endoderm; endoderm; larynx; More reference expression data
BioGPS	n/a
Gene ontology
Molecular function	fibroblast growth factor receptor binding; growth factor activity; protein tyrosine kinase activity; phosphatidylinositol-4,5-bisphosphate 3-kinase activity; 1-phosphatidylinositol-3-kinase activity
Cellular component	extracellular region; intracellular anatomical structure; extracellular space
Biological process	cell-cell signaling; signal transduction involved in regulation of gene expression; glial cell differentiation; nervous system development; MAPK cascade; fibroblast growth factor receptor signaling pathway; positive regulation of cell population proliferation; cell population proliferation; positive regulation of cell division; phosphatidylinositol phosphate biosynthetic process; peptidyl-tyrosine phosphorylation; phosphatidylinositol-3-phosphate biosynthetic process; regulation of signaling receptor activity; positive regulation of protein kinase B signaling
Sources:Amigo / QuickGO
Orthologs
Databases	NCBI: entry; OMA: entry
Species	Human	Mouse
Entrez	2250	14176
Ensembl	ENSG00000138675	ENSMUSG00000029337
UniProt	P12034	P15656
RefSeq (mRNA)	NM_033143; NM_001291812; NM_004464	NM_001277268; NM_010203
RefSeq (protein)	NP_001278741; NP_004455; NP_149134	NP_001264197; NP_034333
Location (UCSC)	Chr 4: 80.27 – 80.34 Mb	Chr 5: 98.4 – 98.42 Mb
PubMed search
- Wikidata
View/Edit Human	View/Edit Mouse

Fibroblast growth factor 5 is a protein that in humans is encoded by the FGF5 gene.

The majority of FGF family members are glycosaminoglycan binding proteins which possess broad mitogenic and cell survival activities, and are involved in a variety of biological processes, including embryonic development, cell growth, morphogenesis, tissue repair, tumor growth and invasion. FGF proteins interact with a family of specific tyrosine kinase receptors, a process often regulated by proteoglycans or extracellular binding protein cofactors. A number of intracellular signalling cascades are known to be activated after FGF-FGFR interaction including PI3K-AKT, PLCγ, RAS-MAPK and STAT pathways.

== Receptor ==
FGF5 is a 268 amino acid, 29.1 kDa protein, which also naturally occurs as a 123 amino acid isoform splice variant (FGF5s). FGF5 is produced in the outer root sheath of the hair follicle as well as perifollicular macrophages, with maximum expression occurring in the late anagen phase of the hair cycle. The receptor for FGF5, FGFR1, is largely expressed in the dermal papilla cells of the hair follicle. The alternatively spliced isoform FGF5s, has been identified as an antagonist of FGF5 in a number of studies.

== Role in hair cycling ==
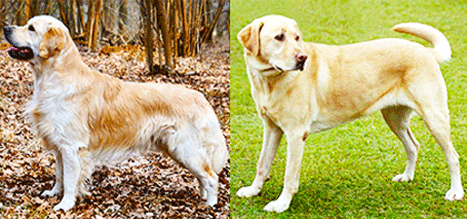
Research comparing different breeds of dogs has demonstrated FGF5 as a major contributing factor in coat length.

The only described function of FGF5 in adults is in the regulation of the hair cycle. FGF5 performs a critical role in the hair cycle, where it acts as the key signalling molecule in initiating the transition from the anagen (growth) phase to the catagen (regression) phase. Evidence of this activity was initially gathered via targeted disruption of the homolog of the FGF5 gene in mice, which resulted in a phenotype with abnormally long hair.

In numerous genetic studies of long haired phenotypes of animals it has been shown that small changes in the FGF5 gene can disrupt its expression, leading to an increase in the length of the anagen phase of the hair cycle, resulting in phenotypes with extremely long hair. This has been demonstrated in many species, including cats, dogs, mice, rabbits, donkeys, sheep and goats, where it is often referred to as the angora mutation. Recently, CRISPR modification of goats to artificially knock out the FGF5 gene, was shown to result in higher wool yield, without any fertility or other negative effects on the goats.

It has been hypothesised that, in an alternate type of mutation, positive selection for increased expression of the FGF5 protein was one of the contributing factors in the evolutionary loss of hair in cetaceans as they transitioned from the terrestrial to the aquatic environment.

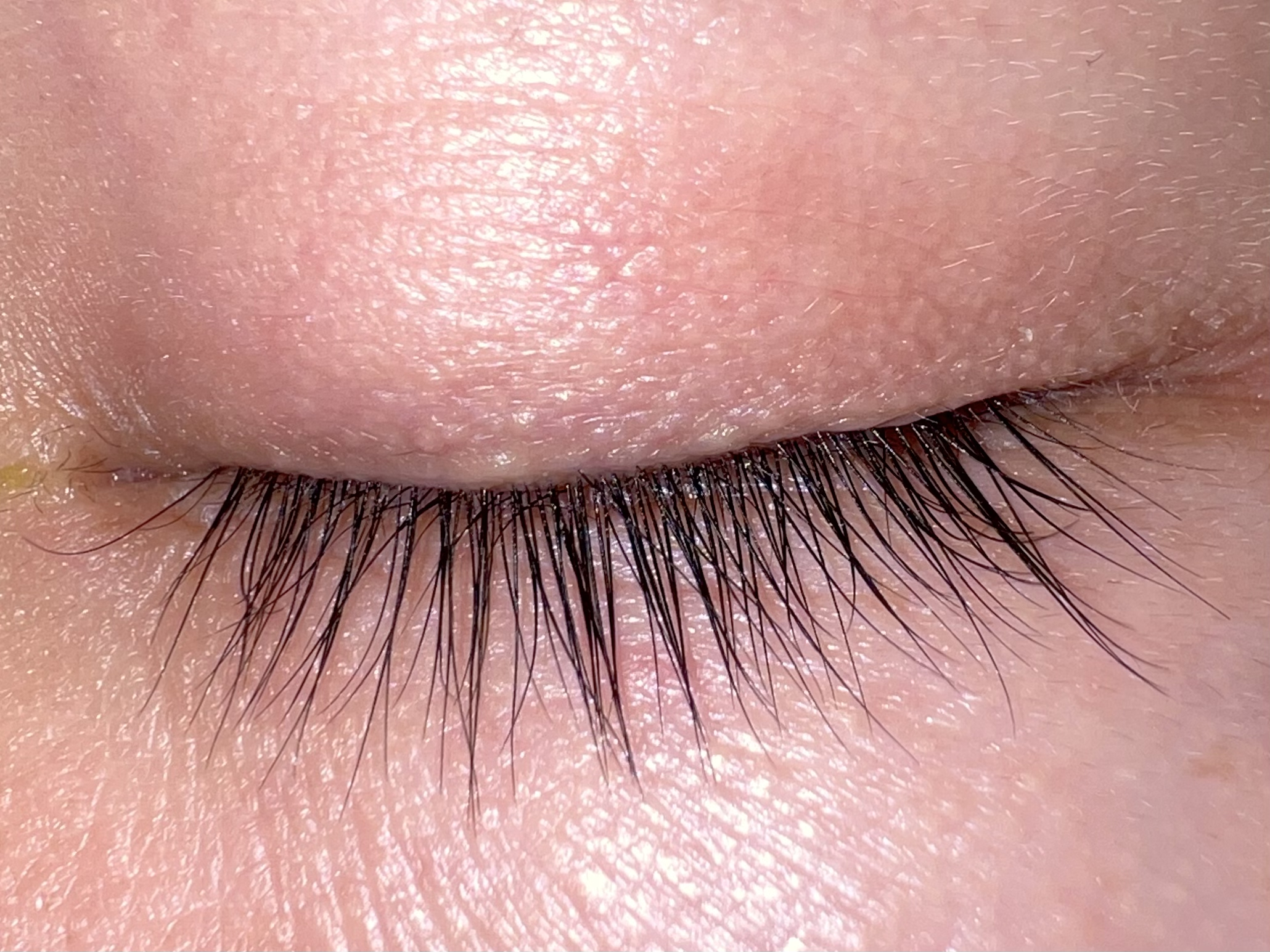
A classic characteristic of FGF5 mutations is extremely long eyelashes, as seen in this case on a human adult male. His upper lashes are 14mm long, double that of the typical human eyelash length of 7 mm.

FGF5 also affects the hair cycle in humans. Individuals with mutations in FGF5 exhibit familial trichomegaly, a condition that involves a significant increase in the portion of anagen phase hair as well as extremely long eyelashes. FGF5 has also been identified as a potentially important factor in androgenetic alopecia. In 2017, a large genome wide association study of men with early onset androgenetic alopecia identified polymorphisms in FGF5 as having a strong association with male pattern hair loss.

Blocking FGF5 in the human scalp extends the hair cycle, resulting in less hair fall, faster hair growth rate and increased hair growth. In vitro methods using engineered cell lines and FGFR1 expressing dermal papilla cells have identified a number of naturally derived botanical isolates including Sanguisorba officnalis, and single molecule members of the monoterpenoid family as inhibitors (blockers) of FGF5. Clinical studies have shown that topical application of formulations containing these natural extracts and molecules are beneficial in men and women experiencing hair loss.
