= CORIN =

Protein found in humans

Identifiers
- Aliases: CORIN, ATC2, CRN, Lrp4, PEE5, TMPRSS10, corin, serine peptidase
- External IDs: OMIM: 605236; MGI: 1349451; GeneCards: CORIN

Gene location (Human)
Chr.	Chromosome 4 (human)
Band	4p12	Start	47,593,999 bp
Band	4p12	End	47,838,106 bp

Gene location (Mouse)
Chr.	Chromosome 5 (mouse)
Band	5|5 C3.2	Start	72,457,368 bp
Band	5|5 C3.2	End	72,661,816 bp
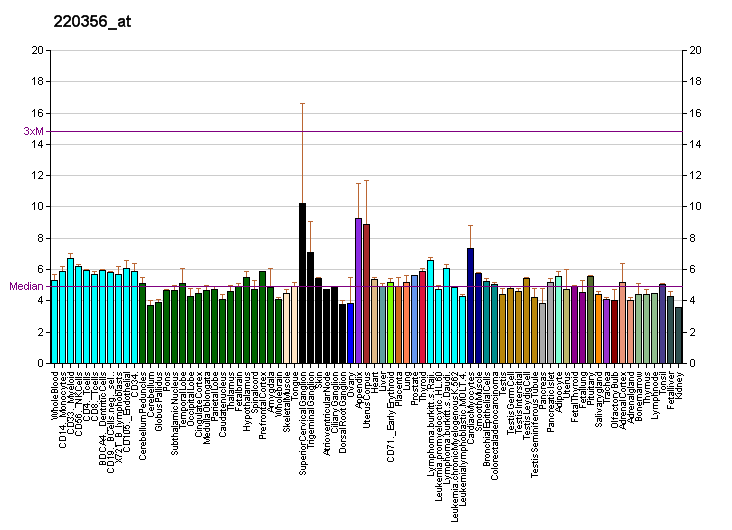
RNA expression pattern
Bgee	Human / Mouse (ortholog); Top expressed in: cardiac muscle tissue of right atrium; right ventricle; right auricle of heart; myocardium of left ventricle; apex of heart; decidua; skin of thigh; human penis; skin of arm; stromal cell of endometrium / Top expressed in: myocardium of ventricle; atrium; right ventricle; atrioventricular valve; cardiac muscle tissue of left ventricle; umbilical cord; skin of external ear; interventricular septum; hair follicle; vestibular sensory epithelium; More reference expression data
BioGPS	More reference expression data
Gene ontology
Molecular function	peptidase activity; hydrolase activity; serine-type peptidase activity; serine-type endopeptidase activity
Cellular component	integral component of membrane; cell surface; integral component of plasma membrane; extracellular region; membrane; plasma membrane; actin cytoskeleton; nuclear body
Biological process	regulation of cardiac conduction; regulation of renal sodium excretion; proteolysis; regulation of blood pressure; regulation of systemic arterial blood pressure by atrial natriuretic peptide; peptide hormone processing; female pregnancy
Sources:Amigo / QuickGO
Orthologs
Databases	NCBI: entry; OMA: entry
Species	Human	Mouse
Entrez	10699	53419
Ensembl	ENSG00000145244	ENSMUSG00000005220
UniProt	Q9Y5Q5	Q9Z319
RefSeq (mRNA)	NM_006587; NM_001278585; NM_001278586	NM_001122756; NM_016869
RefSeq (protein)	NP_001265514; NP_001265515; NP_006578	NP_001116228; NP_058565
Location (UCSC)	Chr 4: 47.59 – 47.84 Mb	Chr 5: 72.46 – 72.66 Mb
PubMed search
- Wikidata
View/Edit Human	View/Edit Mouse

Corin, also called atrial natriuretic peptide-converting enzyme, is a protein that in humans is encoded by the CORIN gene.

== Protein ==
Human corin, a polypeptide of 1042 amino acids, consists of an N-terminal cytoplasmic domain, a transmembrane domain and an extracellular region with two frizzled-like domains, eight LDL receptor-like domains, a scavenger receptor-like domain and a C-terminal trypsin-like serine protease domain. Corin is synthesized as a zymogen that is activated by PCSK6.

Corin exhibits a trypsin-like catalytic activity favoring basic residues at the P1 position.

Human corin contains 19 N-glycosylation sites. N-glycans promote corin expression on the cell surface and protect corin from metalloproteinase-mediated shedding.

== Function ==
Corin converts the atrial natriuretic peptide (ANP) precursor, pro-ANP, to mature ANP, a cardiac hormone that regulates salt-water balance and blood pressure. In mice, corin deficiency prevents pro-ANP processing and causes salt-sensitive hypertension.

Corin may also function as a pro-brain-type natriuretic peptide convertase.

Corin-mediated ANP production in the pregnant uterus promotes spiral artery remodeling and trophoblast invasion. CORIN mutations have been reported in patients with preeclampsia.

In mice, corin functions in the dermal papilla to regulate coat color in an Agouti-dependent pathway.

== Variants and mutations ==
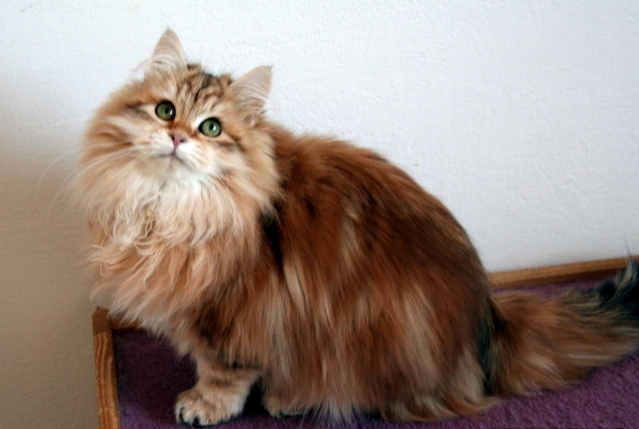
The golden-brown and pale-faced "sunshine" coat pattern in Siberian cats is due to a mutant corin allele interacting with a black fur color

Variants encoded by alternative exons were reported in human and mouse corin. A variant allele (T555I/Q568P) was found in African Americans with hypertension and cardiac hypertrophy. The amino acid substitutions impaired corin activity. An insertion variant in exon 1 alters the cytoplasmic tail. This variant appeared more frequently in hypertensive patients. CORIN mutations were found in patients with hypertension.

In the cat family (Felidae), mutant alleles of the corin gene are responsible for "golden" or "metallic" fur, in particular the "sunshine" coloration (FIFé EMS Code "u") of the Siberian Forest Cat breed, but also in the British Shorthair and some other domestic cats (where EMS Code "y" is used to denote this coloration), as well as in golden tigers.
