= KRT71 =

Protein-coding gene in humans

Identifiers
- Aliases: KRT71, HYPT13, K6IRS1, KRT6IRS, KRT6IRS1, keratin 71
- External IDs: OMIM: 608245; MGI: 1861586; GeneCards: KRT71

Gene location (Human)
Chr.	Chromosome 12 (human)
Band	12q13.13	Start	52,543,909 bp
Band	12q13.13	End	52,553,145 bp

Gene location (Mouse)
Chr.	Chromosome 15 (mouse)
Band	15 F2|15 57.0 cM	Start	101,642,384 bp
Band	15 F2|15 57.0 cM	End	101,651,544 bp
RNA expression pattern
Bgee	Human / Mouse (ortholog); Top expressed in: skin of arm; skin of hip; nipple; skin of leg; skin of abdomen; right lung; spinal cord; C1 segment; human musculoskeletal system; muscular system / Top expressed in: lip; hair follicle; skin of back; skin of abdomen; skin of external ear; embryo; secondary oocyte; zygote; sexually immature organism; primary oocyte; More reference expression data
BioGPS	n/a
Gene ontology
Molecular function	protein binding; structural molecule activity
Cellular component	cytoplasm; keratin filament; extracellular exosome; cytoskeleton; intermediate filament; cytosol
Biological process	intermediate filament organization; hair follicle morphogenesis; keratinization; cornification
Sources:Amigo / QuickGO
Orthologs
Databases	NCBI: entry; OMA: entry
Species	Human	Mouse
Entrez	112802	56735
Ensembl	ENSG00000139648	ENSMUSG00000051879
UniProt	Q3SY84	Q9R0H5
RefSeq (mRNA)	NM_033448	NM_019956
RefSeq (protein)	NP_258259	NP_064340
Location (UCSC)	Chr 12: 52.54 – 52.55 Mb	Chr 15: 101.64 – 101.65 Mb
PubMed search
- Wikidata
View/Edit Human	View/Edit Mouse

KRT71 is a keratin gene. Keratins are intermediate filament proteins responsible for the structural integrity of epithelial cells and are subdivided into epithelial keratins and hair keratins. This gene encodes a protein that is expressed in the inner root sheath of hair follicles. The type II keratins are clustered in a region of chromosome 12q13.
