= Carl Kahler =

Austrian genre, landscape, and animal painter known especially for cat paintings

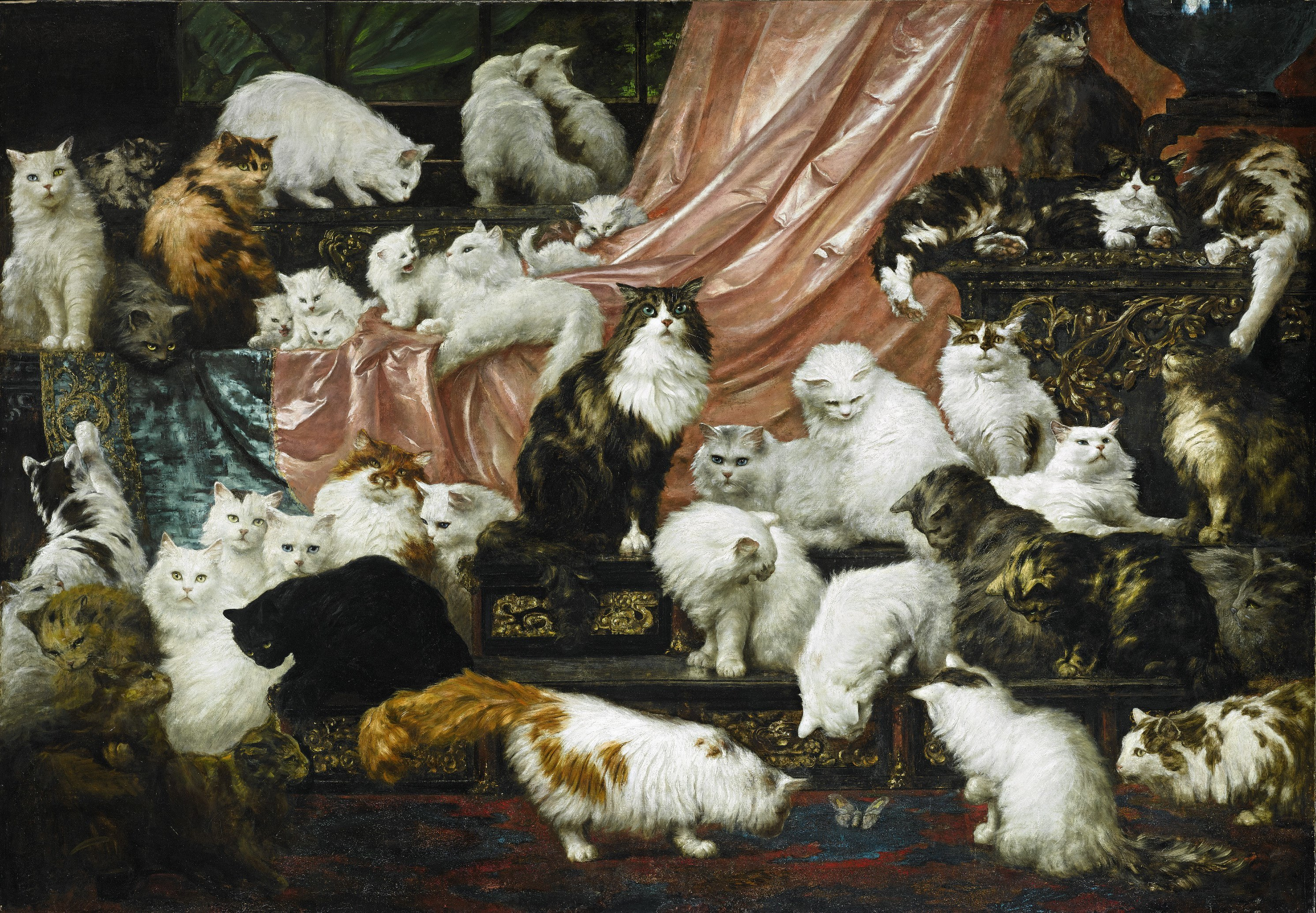
- My Wife's Lovers (1891)
- Born: September 12, 1856; Linz, Austrian Empire
- Died: April 18, 1906 (aged 49); San Francisco, California, United States
- Education: Academy of Fine Arts, Munich
- Known for: Genre scenes, landscapes, animal portraiture
- Notable work: My Wife's Lovers
- Movement: Academic art

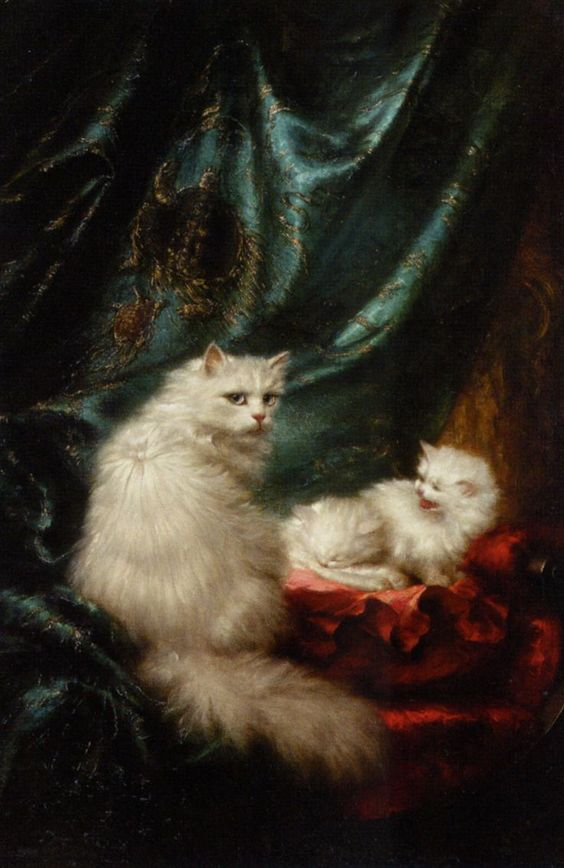
Salonkatzen

Carl Kahler (also spelled Karl Kahler; 12 September 1856 or 1855 – 18 April 1906) was an Austrian painter of genre scenes, landscapes, racehorse subjects and animal portraiture, particularly known for paintings of cats. His painting My Wife's Lovers (1891), a large composition of forty-two cats, became widely reproduced and is the work for which he is best known.

== Biography ==
=== Early life and education ===
Kahler was born in Linz, and some sources give his year of birth as 1855 while Austrian records commonly list 1856. He enrolled at the Academy of Fine Arts, Munich on 19 October 1874, studying under Ludwig von Löfftz and Wilhelm Lindenschmit the Younger. After completing his studies in Munich he pursued further training in Paris and is reported to have worked for a period in Italy.

=== Career in Europe ===
Kahler exhibited in major German-speaking centres in the 1880s, including Berlin, Munich, Dresden and Vienna. He produced genre pictures, portraiture and early animal subjects, and became known for polished academic technique and carefully staged interior compositions.

=== Australia and New Zealand ===
Kahler travelled to Australia in 1885 and established a portrait practice in Melbourne, painting prominent sitters including Sir Henry Brougham Loch, the Governor of Victoria. He produced several large canvases depicting the Flemington Melbourne Cup scene, including The Lawn at Flemington on Melbourne Cup Day (1887), The Derby Day at Flemington (1888–89) and The Betting Ring (1889). The latter is distinctive for featuring individual portraits of each figure in the crowd. Photographic reproductions of these works were made by the firm Goupil & Co. in Paris, which broadened their circulation.

He left Australia in 1890, spent time in New Zealand, and later emigrated to the United States.

=== United States ===
After a brief residence in New York City, Kahler settled in San Francisco in 1891 and opened a studio where he painted portraits, figure subjects and animals. He became known locally as a demanding and sometimes unpredictable painter who set high prices for his canvases and occasionally destroyed works he judged inadequate. In the same year he completed My Wife's Lovers, a commission from California socialite Kate Birdsall Johnson. Its depiction of forty-two individually rendered cats was widely reproduced and became strongly associated with his name.

Kahler exhibited with the San Francisco Art Association during the 1890s and showed at the World's Columbian Exposition in Chicago in 1893. His works are relatively uncommon in the art market. He died in the 1906 San Francisco earthquake on 18 April 1906.

== Selected works ==
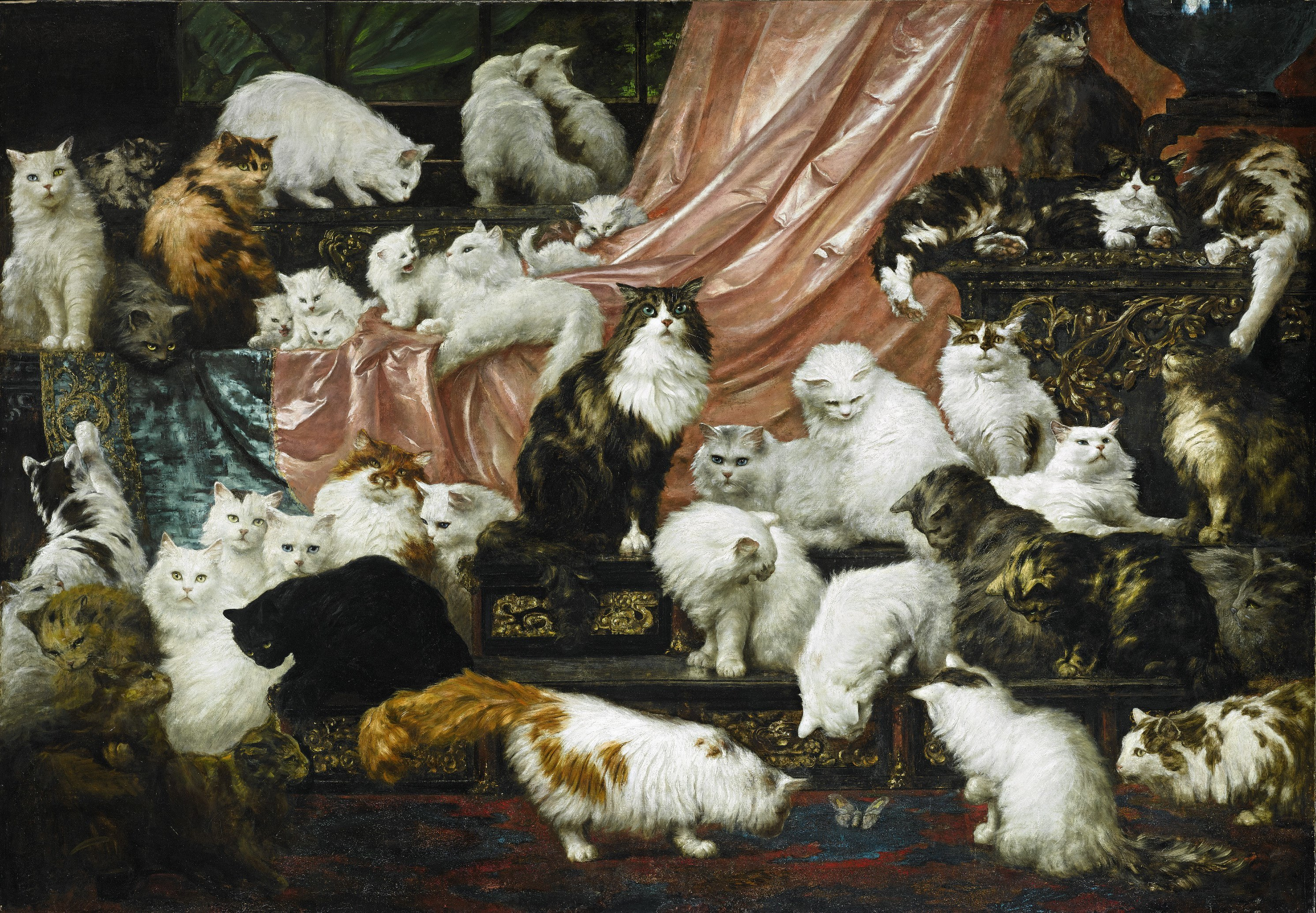
My Wife's Lovers (1891)

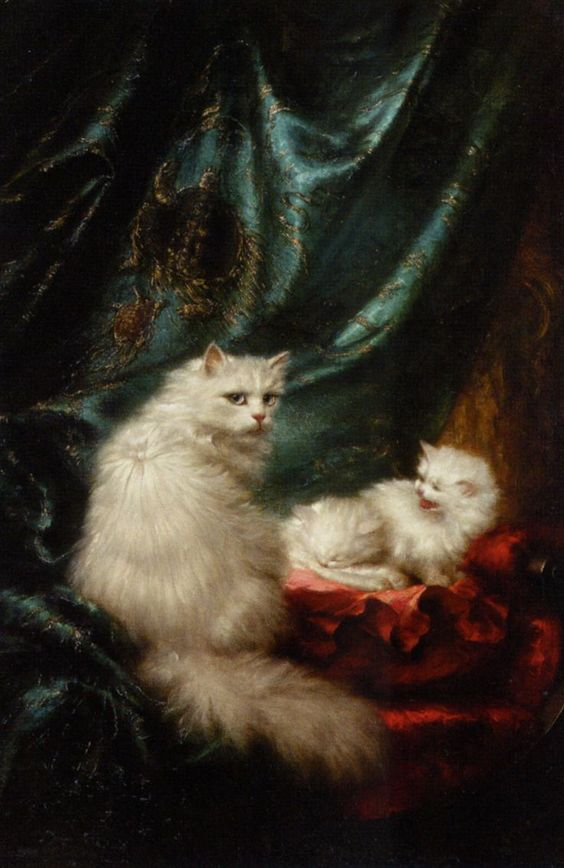
Salonkatzen

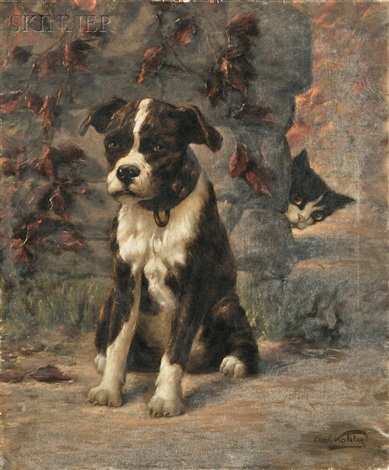
Cat-nipped

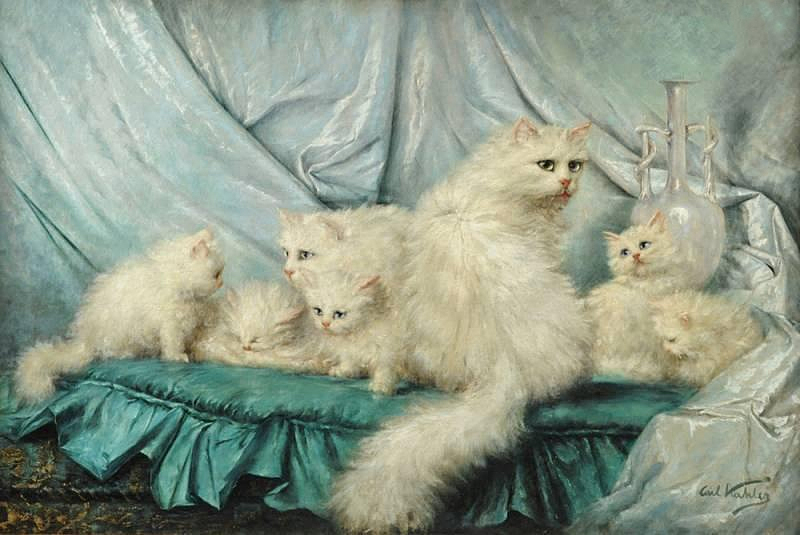
Family Portrait

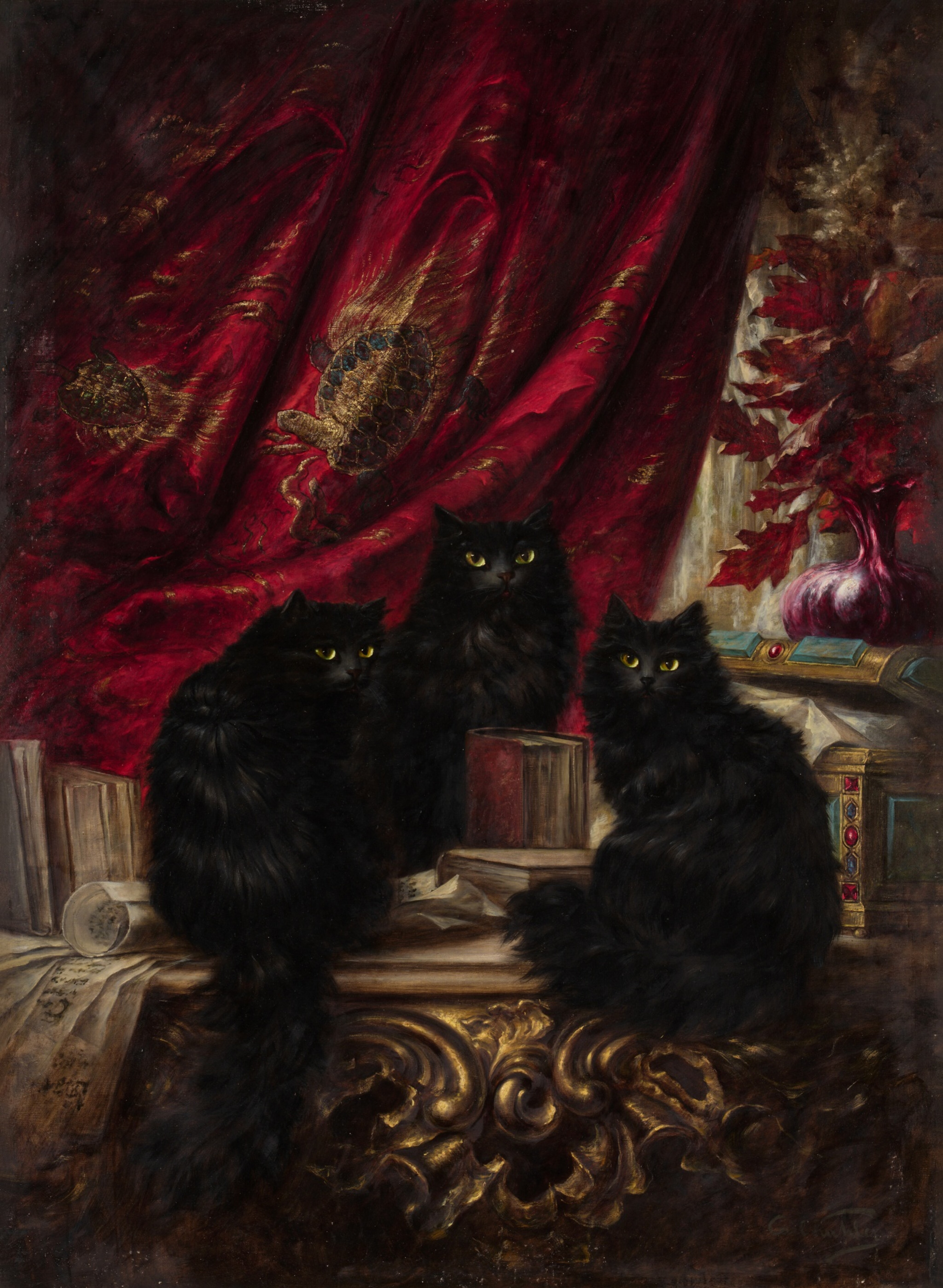
Three Black Cats

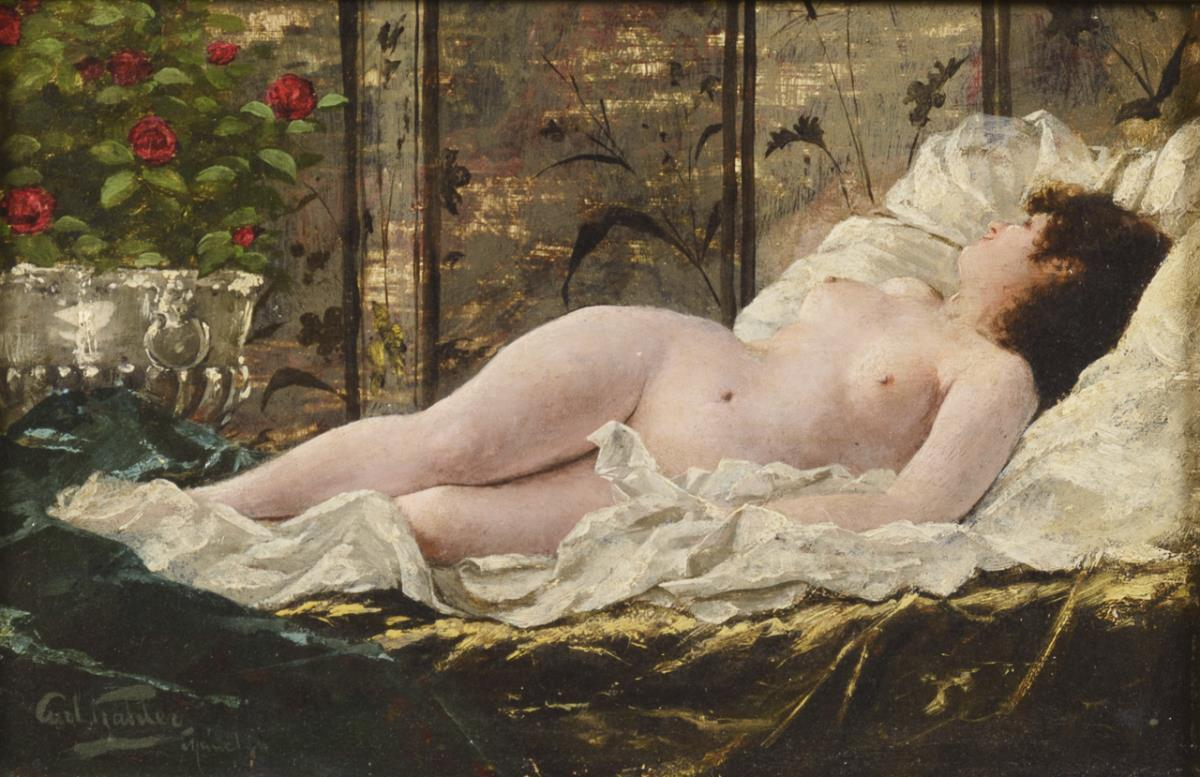
Liegender Akt
