= My Wife's Lovers =

Painting by Carl Kahler

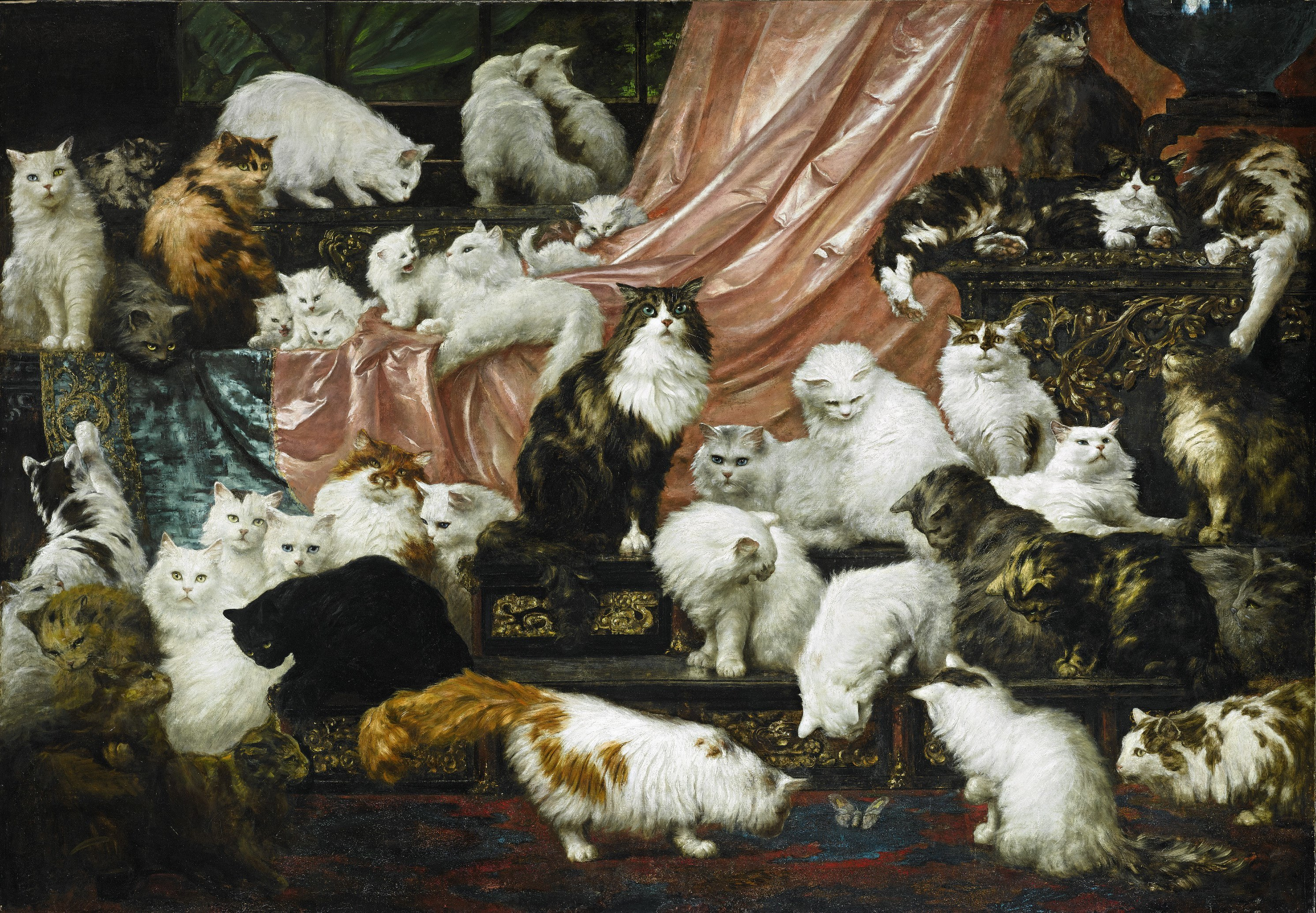
- Artist: Carl Kahler
- Dimensions: 1.8 m × 2.6 m (6 ft × 8.5 ft)
- Weight: 103 kg (227 lb)
- Commissioned by: Kate Birdsall Johnson
- Collection: Unknown

My Wife's Lovers is a canvas painting by the Austrian artist Carl Kahler (1856–1906) depicting forty-two of American millionaire Kate Birdsall Johnson's Turkish Angora and Persian cats. The title of the painting was potentially conceived by her husband, who may have referred to the cats with the phrase. Measuring 1.8 m × 2.6 m (6 ft × 8.5 ft), the canvas weighs 103 kg (227 lb).

== History ==
Some say Johnson owned 350 cats that she housed in her summer house Buena Vista near Sonoma, California, and left them US$500,000 in her will, but this is disputed. She commissioned the painting in 1891. Having never painted a cat before, Kahler spent three years studying cats' poses and learning their habits. He reportedly received around US$5,000 for the painting (equivalent to US$170,000 in 2024). The center of the painting shows her cat Sultan, bought by Johnson during a trip to Paris. Johnson lent the painting for the 1893 Chicago World's Fair, and in the next year it was acquired by Ernest Haquette for his Palace of Art Salon in San Francisco. While the salon was destroyed in the 1906 San Francisco earthquake, the painting survived it.

== Purchases and display ==
My Wife's Lovers subsequently hung in Frank C. Havens' Piedmont Art Gallery in Piedmont, California, and was later purchased by a couple from Chicago. In November 2015, the painting was sold at Sotheby's to a private California buyer for US$826,000.

In 2016, the Portland Art Museum displayed the piece between February 2 and June 8, 2016, and partnered with the Oregon Humane Society to raise awareness of cat adoptions.
