= Turkish Van cat =

Turkish Van cat may refer to:

- Van cat, a landrace of domestic cats native to the Lake Van area of present-day Turkey, and of cultural significance to Turks, Armenians and Kurds
- Turkish Van, a British-developed formal breed of domestic cats, based on stock obtained from various places in Turkey

== See also ==
- Turkish Angora, another formal breed of domestic cat, developed from Turkish stock
