= Animals Drawn from Nature and Engraved in Aqua-tinta =

Illustrated book of animals (1788)

Animals Drawn from Nature and Engraved in Aqua-tinta is a book written and illustrated by Charles Catton the younger and published in London in 1788. It is a very early example of a work including hand-coloured aquatints. The thirty-six animals described, all mammals except for the crocodile, were from both the New World and the Old World. At the time Catton had not travelled abroad so he drew native British animals as well as exotics kept in captivity in Britain.

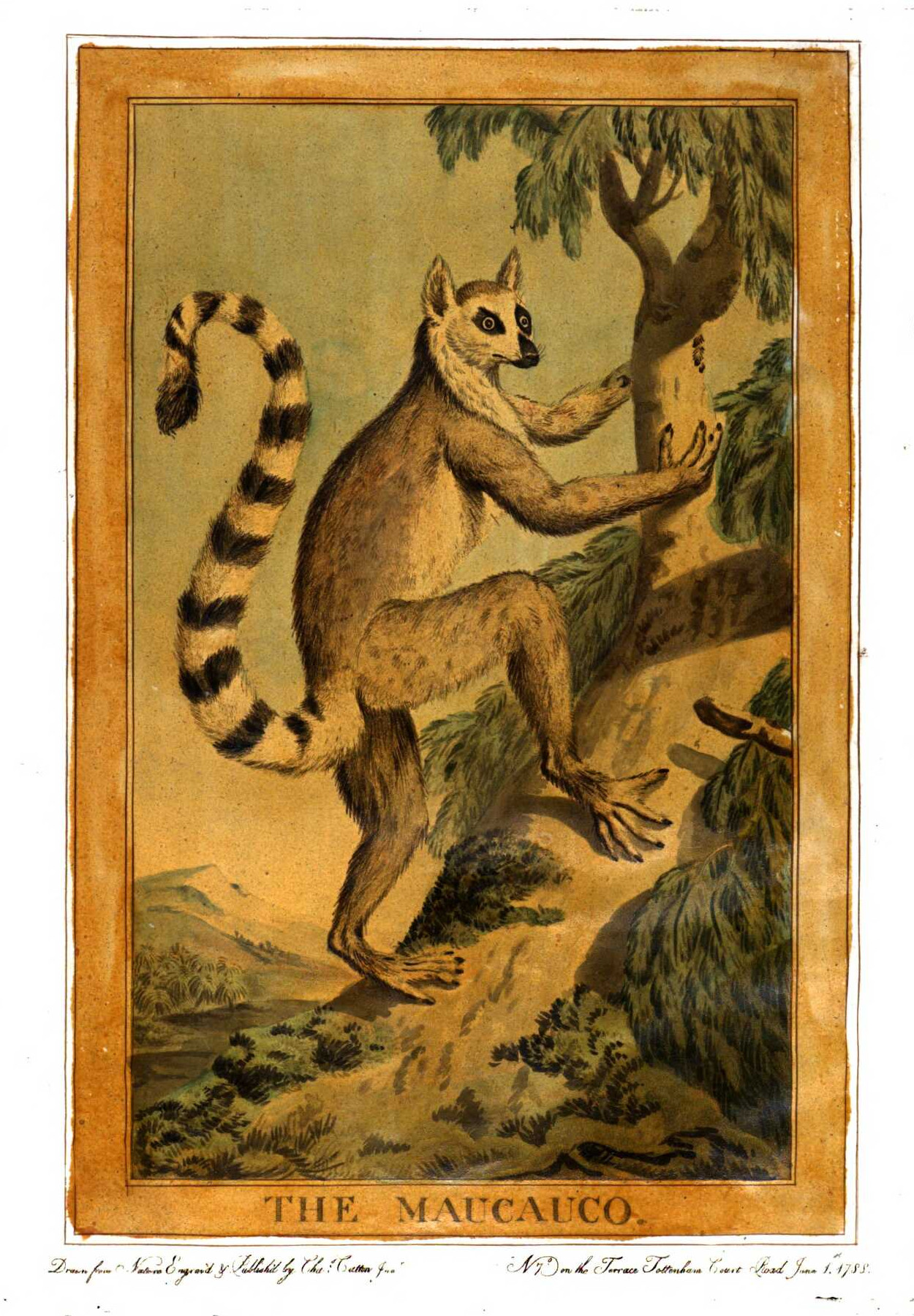
Catton's "The Maucauco" (ring-tailed lemur)

== Background ==
Catton was by profession an artist who was taught his skills by his father, also called Charles Catton, who is known in the history of art as Charles Catton the elder.

=== Charles Catton the elder ===
The elder Catton (1728–1798) was apprenticed to a coach builder at a time when it was fashionable to have heraldic coats of arms painted on the sides of the coaches. He became skilled in the artistic part of his trade and was well known for his ability at painting animals supporting coats of arms in a naturalistic way rather than heraldically. As well as becoming coach painter to George III he became an accomplished portraitist and a founder member of the Royal Academy.

=== Charles Catton the younger's art ===
Charles Catton the younger (1756–1819) was apprenticed to his father, working closely to his style, and was trained at the Royal Academy schools. He exhibited regularly at the academy (1775–1800) – landscapes, animals and topographical watercolours – and was an occasional scene painter at Covent Garden Theatre (1781–1794). He toured Great Britain making paintings and sketches, many of which were later engraved by others but he was a skilled engraver himself. He did not leave Britain until he emigrated to the United States in 1804.

Shortly after "Animals" was published he contributed some illustrations for John White's 1790 Journal of a Voyage to New South Wales.

== Publication ==
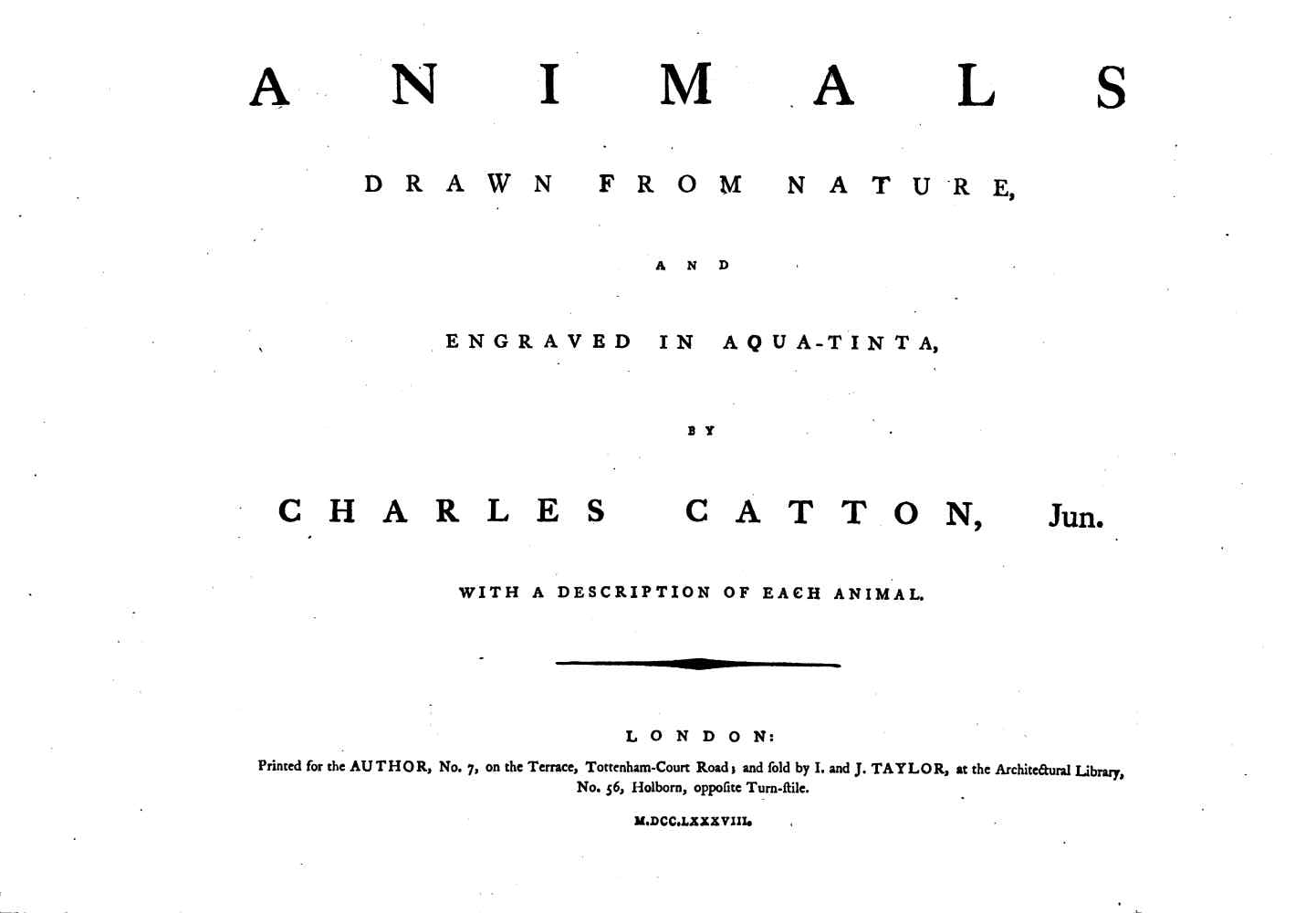

Animals was first published in 1788 in London by I. and J. Taylor and then again in 1825 in New Haven by H. Howe, a local bookseller and publisher. Thirty-six animals are described, each having a whole-page illustration and a page of text. The book has 74 pages including the title and contents pages. The first edition is upright folio (2°), 16.8 by 10.8 inches (426 by 275 mm) and the prints are 12 by 8 in (300 by 200 mm). The text and most of the illustrations are orientated sideways so the pages are in landscape format. The binding is calfskin with gilt embellishments and the spine is in seven panels with a morocco leather title label in the second panel. The endpapers are with spot and veined marbling. (Note: There is a photograph online of the Duke of Gloucester's first edition.)

The Österreichische Nationalbibliothek in Vienna has placed page images of its first edition online. The book is also hosted on the Internet Archive. and a proofread text version is on Wikisource at Animals drawn from Nature and engraved in aqua-tinta. (Note: Free unformatted versions are available from Google online and as an ebook for Google Play. A commercial version formatted in epub format is also on Google Play.)

In the first edition the aquatints are coloured and, according to Sarah Prideaux (1909)

"There are very few books on natural history illustrated in aquatint, but these are, for various reasons, of considerable interest. The earliest use of aquatint for this class of subject that I have found is in a book of Charles Catton, Animals drawn from Nature, with coloured plates in line and aquatint, all of which are covered with a thick yellow varnish. At the bottom of each plate is Drawn from life and engraved by Charles Catton, Jun. No. 7 on the Terrace, Tottenham Court Road, and the date, which is generally 1788; on one, however, it is 1787, and a few are undated."

The "thick yellow varnish" referred to by Prideaux is very evident in the scan available. An example of the American 1825 edition is described as having its images uncoloured.

When describing prints, "hand-coloured" means that a monochrome print has been painted afterwards. This is to be distinguished from "colour-printed" which means that the printing itself was in colour. Colour printing could be produced either by painting the plate carefully with differently coloured inks and then making a single pressing, or by making a number of plates, engraved appropriately for each colour, and making sequential impressions. These techniques may be combined in a single illustration. An example of the British 1788 edition of Animals is described as having "hand-coloured aquatint plates by and after Catton, heightened with white and gum arabic." meaning that the illustrations were coloured afterwards and the reference to gum arabic further suggests that this what is meant. According to Baynton-Williams (1990)

"Despite the fact that stipple engraving and mezzotints were being printed in colours at the time aquatinting started, it was some time before aquatints were colour-printed. James Molton first published a series of views titled Picturesque Views of the City of Dublin in 1795, printed in monotone, but there is a colour version printed in 1798, which is probably the first colour aquatint book."

== Reception ==
In 1791 the book was on sale for £3 17s 0d (equivalent to £500 in 2025) and £9 5s 0d (£1210) if the plates were coloured, (Note: In the catalogue's description "cuts coloured" the word "cuts" means engravings.) but by 1831 the inclusive price was only £3 13s 6d (£330) with the recommendation "Catton was an eminent coach-painter and a very superior draftsman. The above work is scarce in any state, but particularly so in colours and varnish, in which state the plates have the appearance of oil paintings." In 2006 a British first edition sold at Christie's for £3,600 ($6,401 then) and in 2016 an American edition sold for $1,845 (£1,494 then).

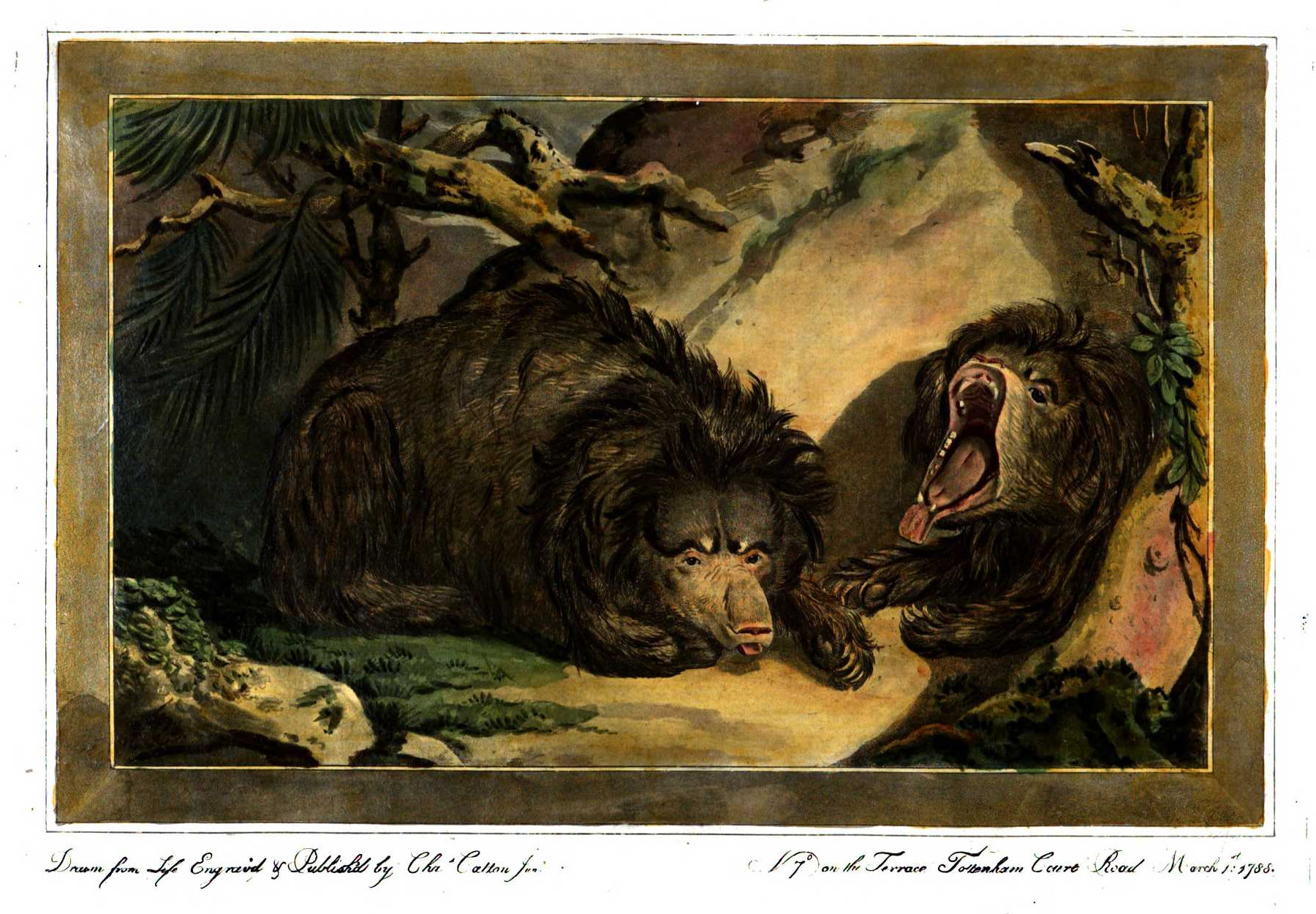
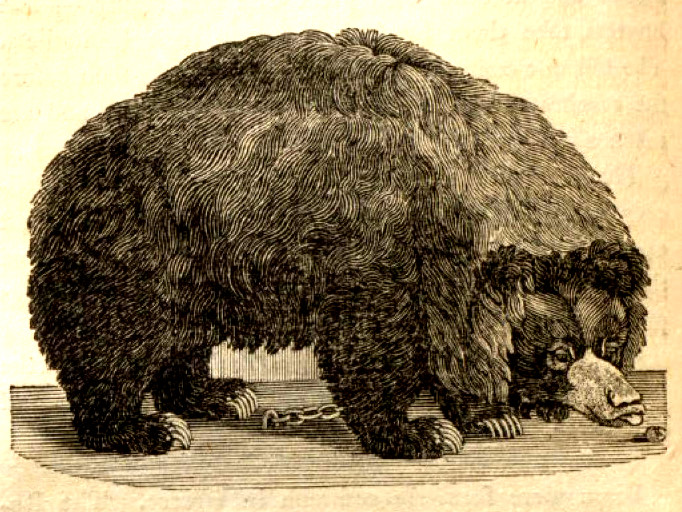

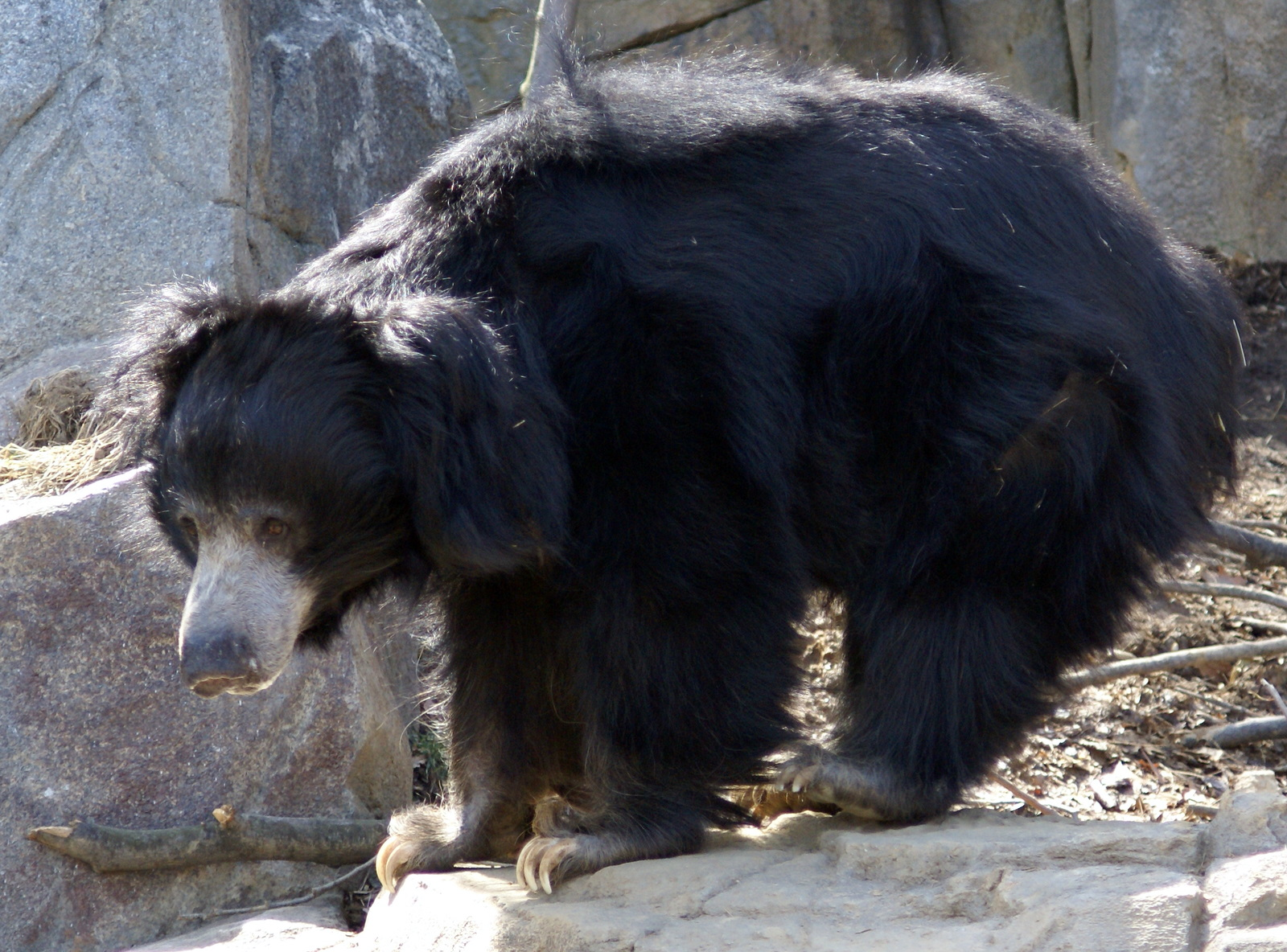
(photograph)

Catton's, 1788 (top) and Bewick's, 1791 unidentified bears (now known as the sloth bear)

Before Catton's book had been published, Thomas Bewick, who had been preparing his own book with monochrome woodcut engravings, A General History of Quadrupeds (1790), got into "a pitch of nervous curiosity" about the forthcoming competition. However, when he saw Catton's work he thought the prints were feeble and the book was considerably overpriced – when "Quadrupeds" was published in 1790 it was "greeted with delight". What Catton had called an "animal of the bear kind" (and what is now known as a sloth bear) made its appearance in Bewick's second, 1791, edition of "Quadrupeds" although it was not named in any way. (Note: Incidentally, Bewick's second edition cost 9/- (equivalent to £59 in 2025) and had 483 pages.) At the end of the 18th century, it was controversial whether this creature was a bear-like sloth or a sloth-like bear, and the matter was still worthy of comment in Richard Owen's 1833 Zoological Magazine where Bewick is praised but Catton is given a slightly adverse review:

"Bewick, in his History of Quadrupeds, has given a characteristic figure and an accurate description of this species; and from the striking correspondence of parts observable between it and the common bear, as well as from an attentive examination of its disposition and manners, he was induced to place it in the same genus, notwithstanding it seemed to differ in some of those characteristics, which have been pointed out by naturalists as the guides to a regular and systematic arrangement. In an earlier and ruder figure, which we find in Caton's Figures of Animals, the good sense of the artist also detected the true relations of this subject, and the animal is called the Petre Bear."

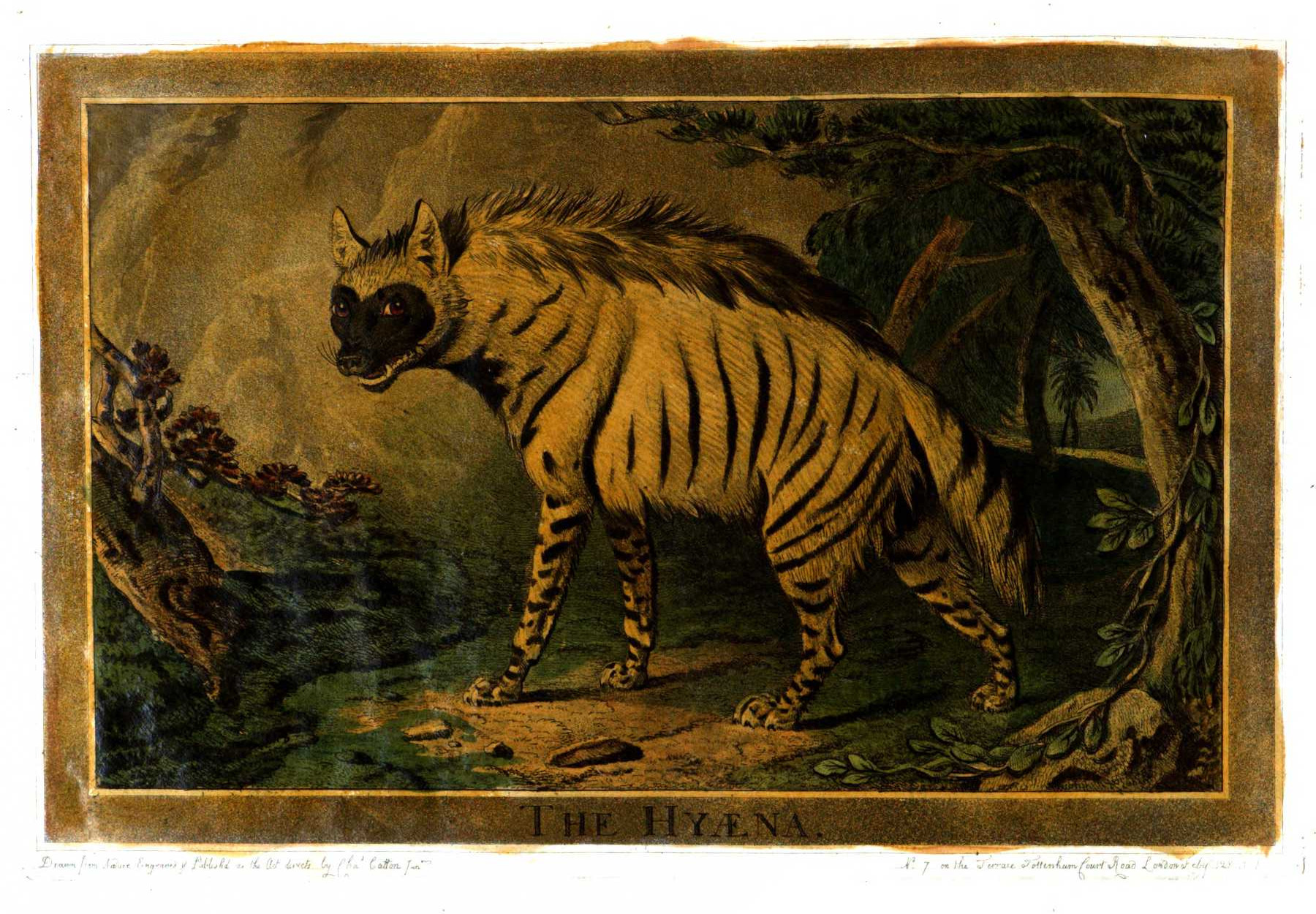
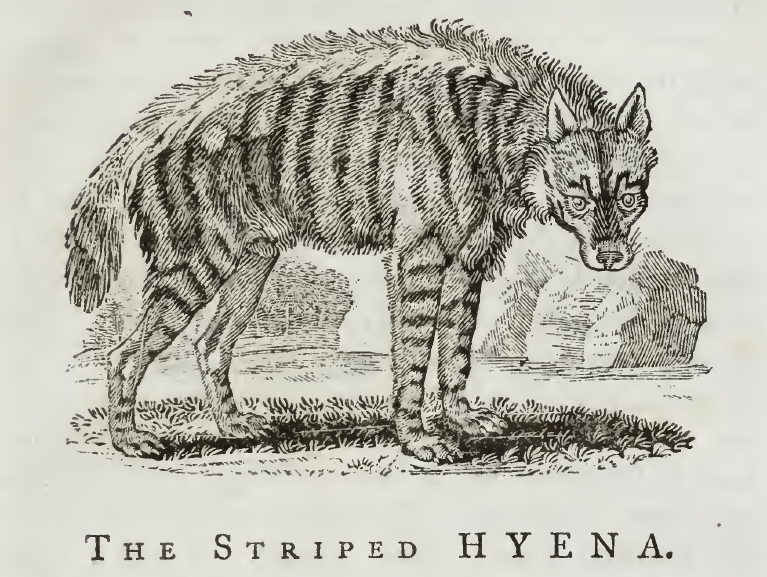
Catton's, 1788 (top) and Bewick's, 1790 hyaenas (Bewick's with added tail)

Bewick's engravings in Quadrupeds were not beyond all criticism. Bewick's brother John was dealing with the publishers and wrote to Thomas:

"I was exceeding sorry, & vext, to see your Hyena done without a tail, an Animal so particularly well known among the Curious, I should thout you might have seen Mr Cattons, which is a pretty good one, I was obliged to cut it from the Proposals as I could not show it to any Body."

To remedy this sorry situation Bewick cut out part of his wood block and inserted a new piece of wood so that he could engrave a tail.

== Animals included ==
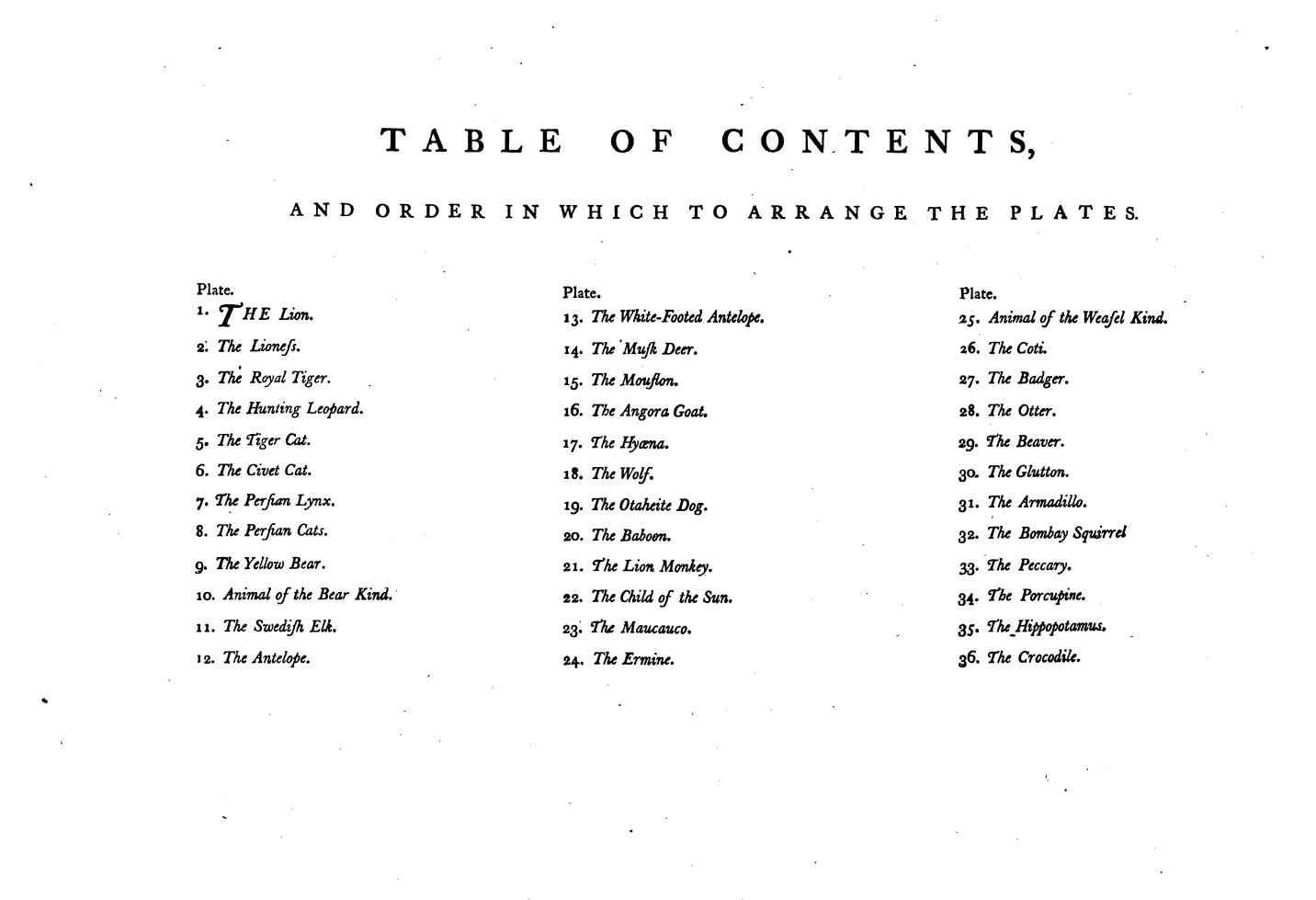
Table of Contents for Catton's book

Despite the title of Catton's book the animals were not all drawn from nature and not even from life as his individual texts sometimes acknowledge.

=== Identifications of animals ===
Catton did not use Linnaean taxonomy and his descriptions were those of an artist experienced in careful observation, not of an experienced naturalist. Hence, except when he uses the same name as is extant (even if rather archaic), this section records what experienced naturalists have later claimed are the specific identifications (sometimes from first-hand knowledge) or what Catton himself said were other naturalists' identifications. No attempt is made here to make identifications based on Catton's physical or behavioural descriptions, or from his illustrations.

- Plate 1 and Plate 2. The Lion and Lioness – Panthera leo, the only species of lion.
- Plate 3. The Tiger – Panthera tigris.
- Plate 4. The Hunting Leopard – Panthera pardus.
- Plate 5. The Tiger Cat – Catton says this is Buffon's ocelot, Felis pardalis, now Leopardus pardalis. (Note: The ocelot is from the Americas and is not native to South Africa, indeed no species of small cat is native to the Americas and to South Africa.)
- Plate 6. The Civet Cat – many possible species of civet.
- Plate 7. The Persian Lynx – Catton says "The Turks call it Karrah-Kulak", hence caracal, Caracal caracal.
- Plate 8. The Persian Cat, (illustration labelled "Angora Catts") – Angora cat breed of Felis catus.
- Plate 9. The Yellow Bear – "Among Mr Catton's figures of quadrupeds a representation is given of a yellow bear from the living animal then kept in the Tower" is in Hart Merriam's description of "The Yellow Bear of Louisiana, Ursus luteolus Griffith", now Ursus americanus luteolus. (Note: What Griffith considered a "separate species" from Ursus Americanus (and also called the cinnamon bear) was later regarded as a subspecies and now merely a colour phase of the Louisiana black bear.)

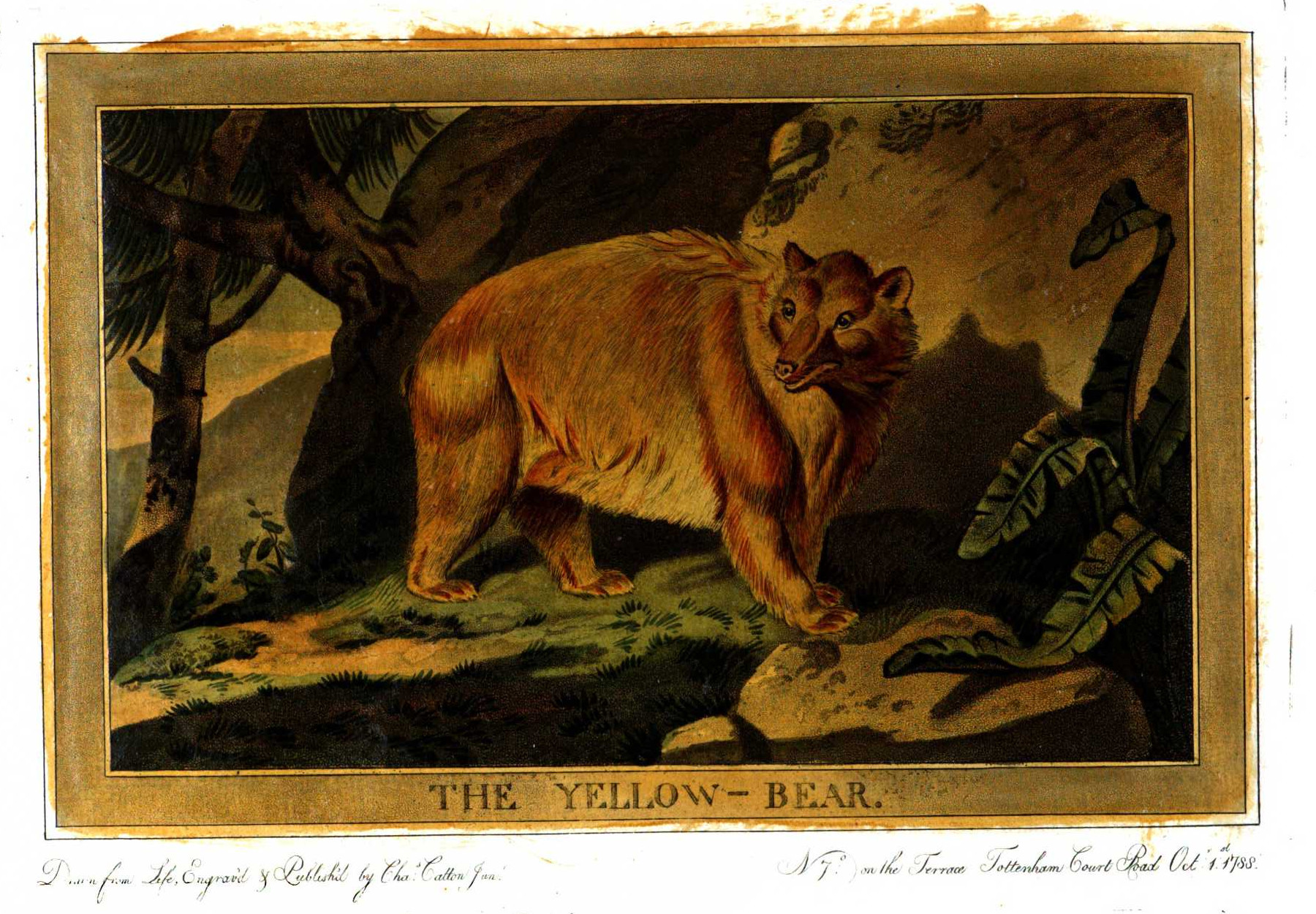
Catton's "Yellow Bear", 1788 (above) and Griffith's Ursus luteolus, 1821

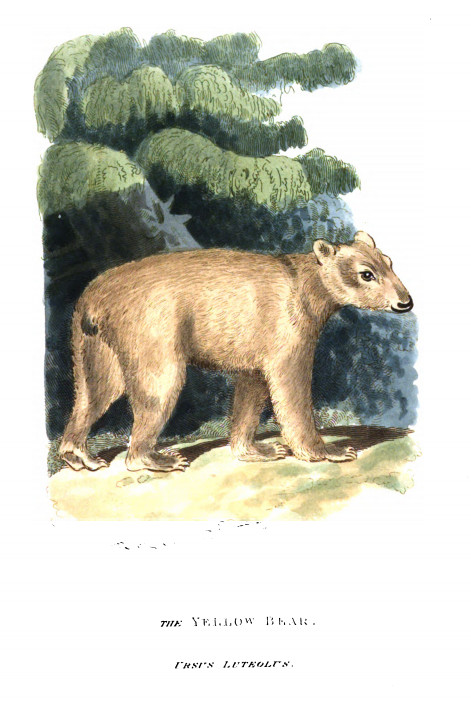
- Plate 10. Animal of the Bear Kind – George Shaw said Catton was "an artist who has been peculiarly happy in expressing the appearance of the animal". Shaw identified Catton's Petre bear as an "Ursine Sloth", or Bradypus Ursinus, now Melursus ursinus or sloth bear. (Note: Those considering this animal to be a sloth (Bradypus means sloth) sometimes also called it a "five-toed sloth" and this term has emerged into 21st-century slang to mean a lazy or slow human being.)
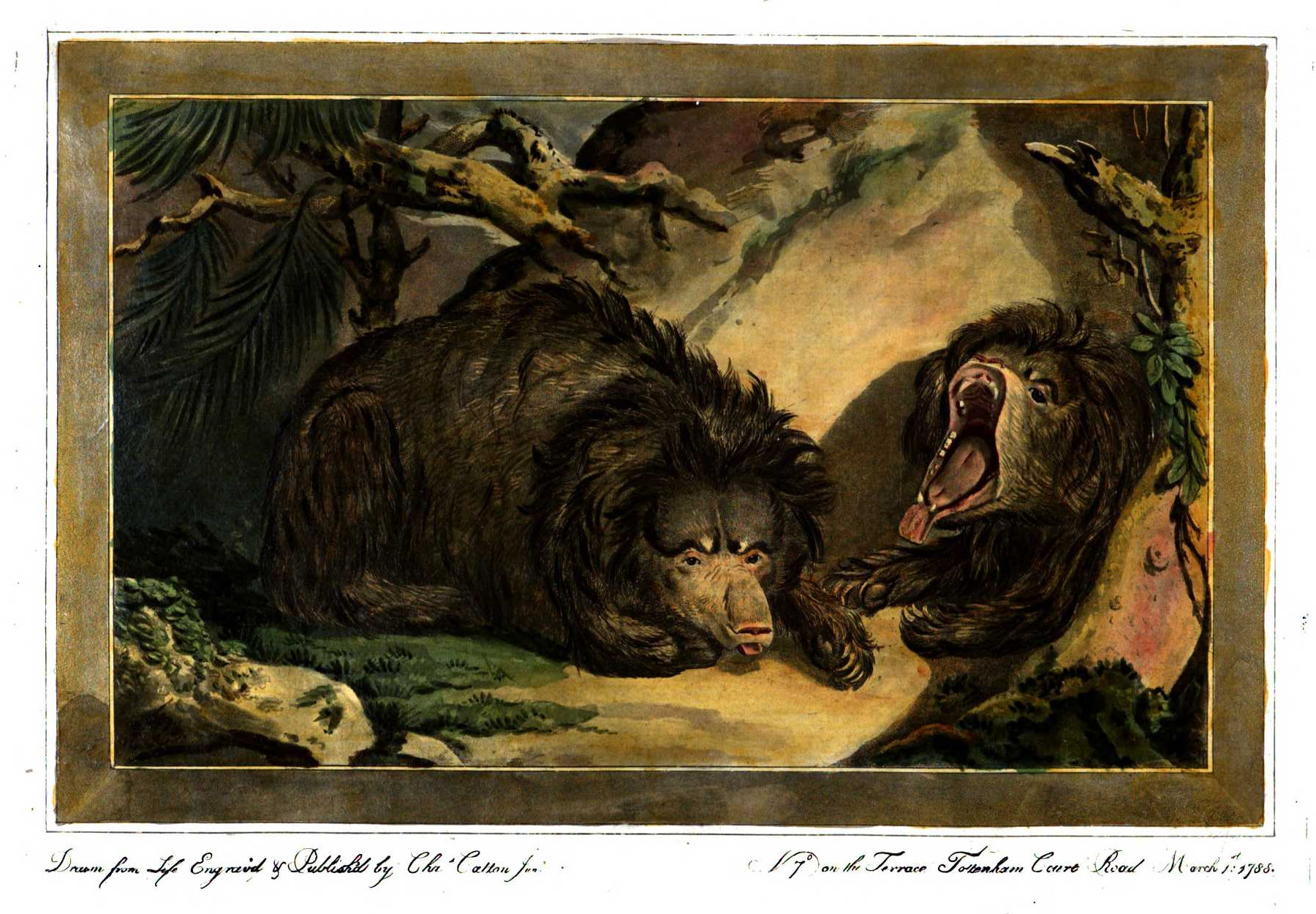

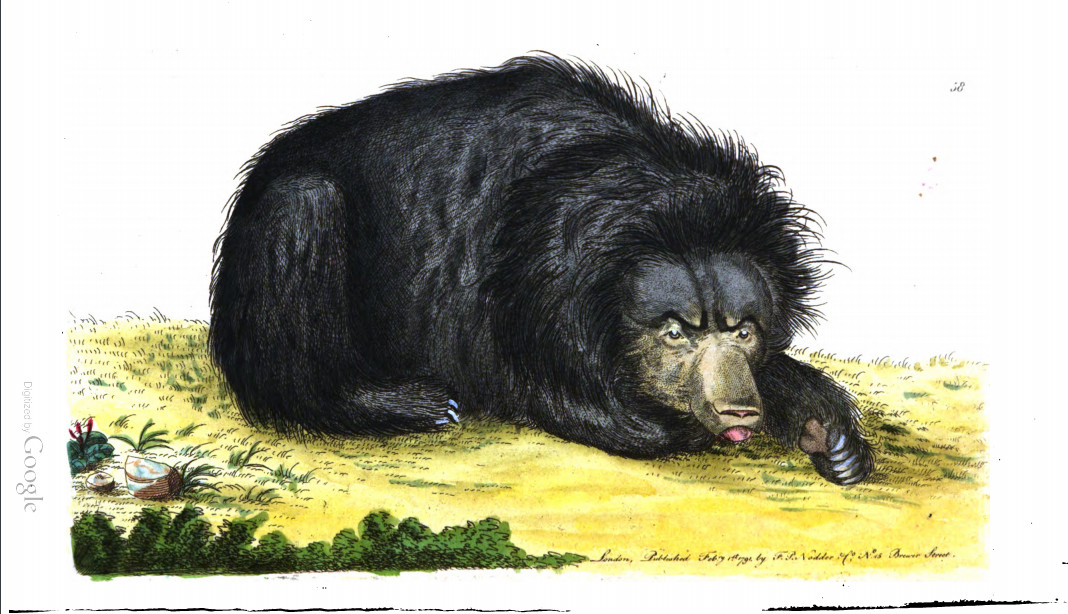
Catton's "Animal of the Bear-Kind", 1788 (left) and Frederick Nodder's "Ursine Sloth", 1791

- Plate 11. The Swedish Elk – Alces alces, in Britain the elk is what in America is called a moose.
- Plate 12. The Antelope – Catton regards antelope as a "class" or "tribe" of mammals, not a species.
- Plate 13. The White-Footed Antelope – still an alternative name for Boselaphus tragocamelus or Nilgai.
- Plate 14. The Musk Deer – one of the several species of musk deer.
- Plate 15. The Mouflon – mouflon is a type of wild sheep, Ovis orientalis.
- Plate 16. The Angora Goat, the angora goat is a breed of domestic goat, species Capra aegagrus.
- Plate 17. The Hyæna – Catton refers to Buffon, who was describing Canis hyaena, now Hyaena hyaena, the striped hyaena.
- Plate 18. The Wolf – it was Canis lupus that was extirpated in Britain.
- Plate 19. The Otaheite Dog – Tahitian Dog ("Otaheite" is Tahiti).
- Plate 20. The Baboon – Catton's section heading "The Great Baboon" refers to what at the time was regarded as a species of baboon, the Mandrill Baboon, now Mandrillus sphinx. (Note: Pennant discusses the "Great Baboon".)
- Plate 21. The Lion Monkey – the Lion monkey, a lion tamarin of genus Leontopithecus.
- Plate 22. The Child of the Sun – at the time also called the "Arabian Savage", suggested to be a hamadryas baboon. It was at the Exeter Exchange at a time when Thomas Clark was there (1773–1793). In any case it was genus Papio. (Note: Baboons (and monkeys five feet tall) do not come from South America which Catton had been told was the origin.)
- Plate 23. The Maucauco – Lemur catta.
- Plate 24. The Ermine – Mustela erminea.
- Plate 25. Animal of the Weasel Kind – Shaw suggests Catton's illustration is of a variety of Viverra putorius Linnaeus, now Spilogale putorius, the eastern spotted skunk. (Note: The spotted skunk is native to north and central America, not India (Bengal). Its number of stripes is variable but there can be four.)
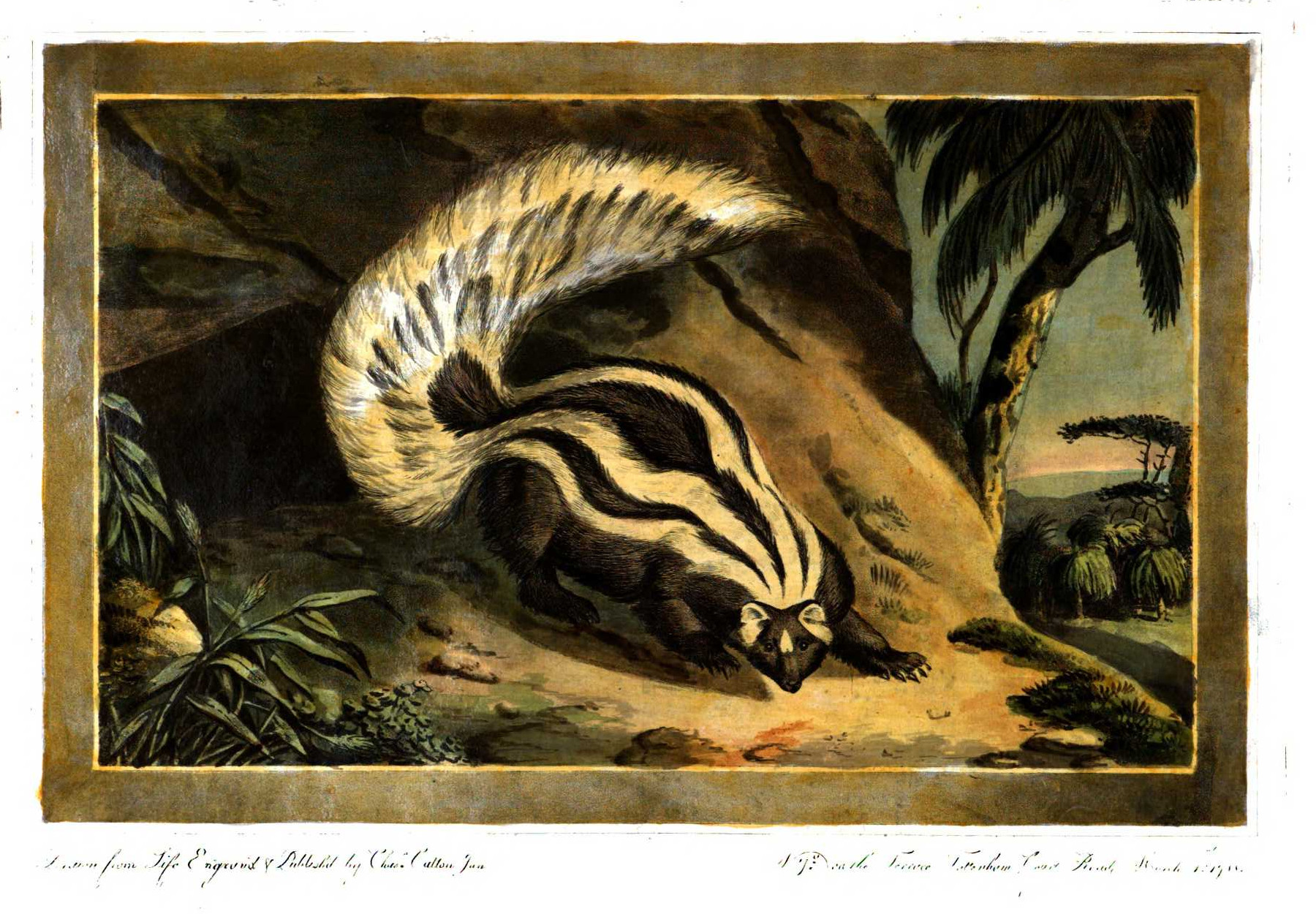

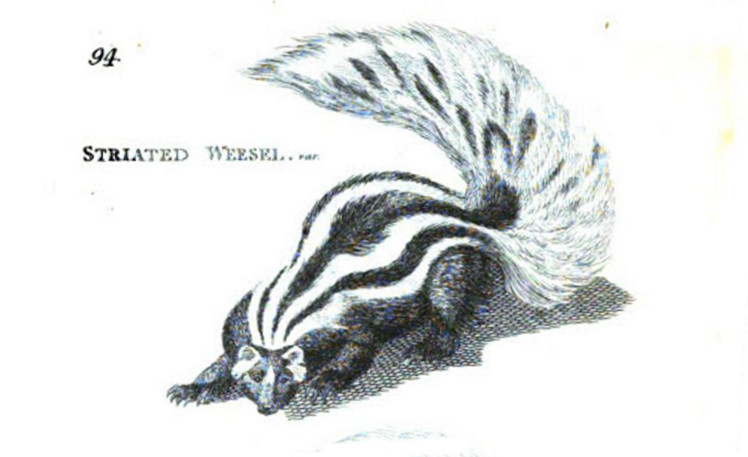
Catton's "Animal of the Weasel-kind", 1788 (left) and Shaw's "Striated Weesel", 1800

- Plate 26. The Coti – Catton says this is Buffon's Le Coati noiratre, which was Linnaeus' Viverra nasua, now nasua nasua. However, Buffon's other species, Coati Brun, is implied by Catton calling it "The Brown Coti" which was Linnaeus' Viverra narica, now Nasua narica. (Note: Allen gives a fascinating account of the deteriorating state of coati taxonomy during the 19th century.)
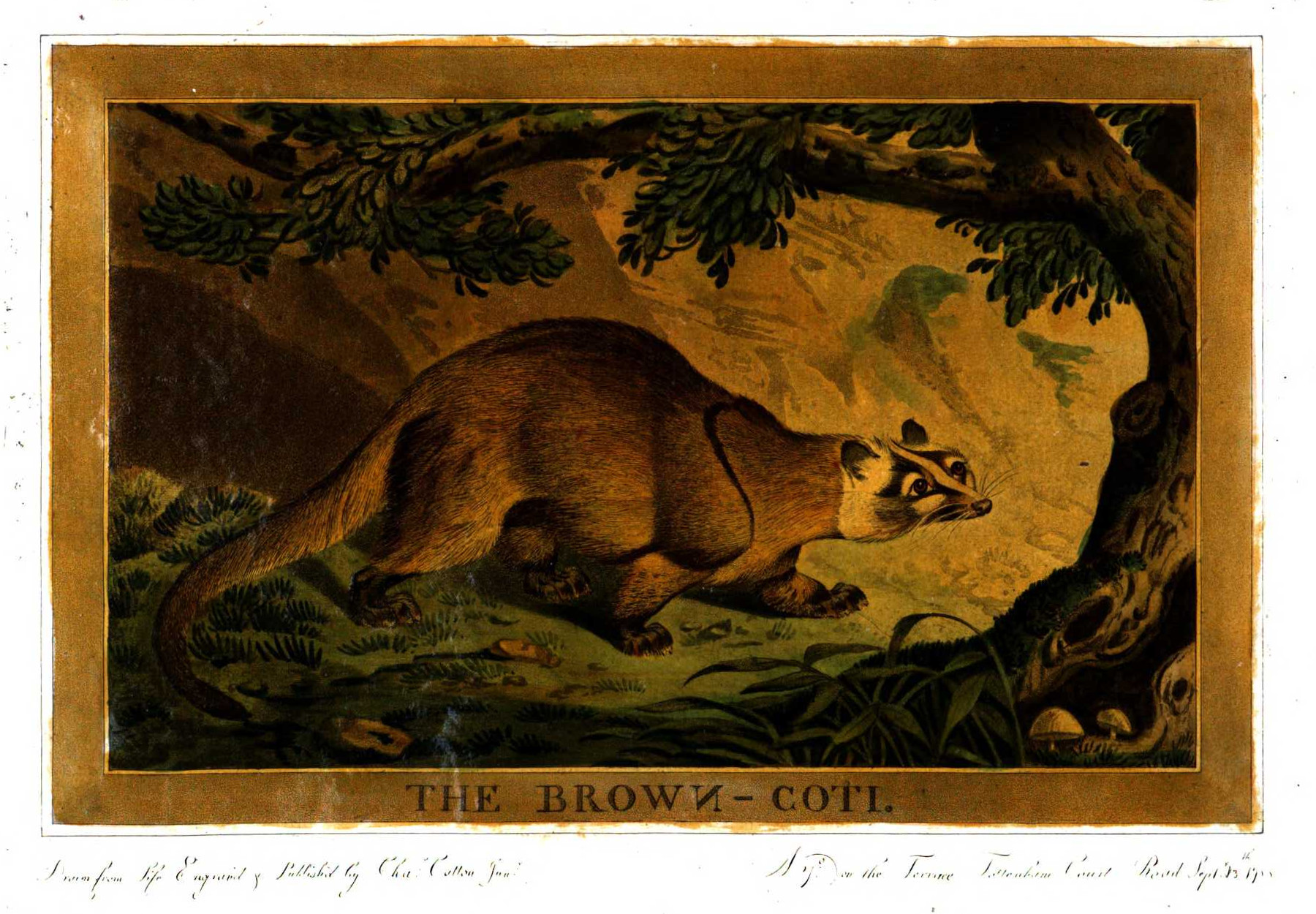
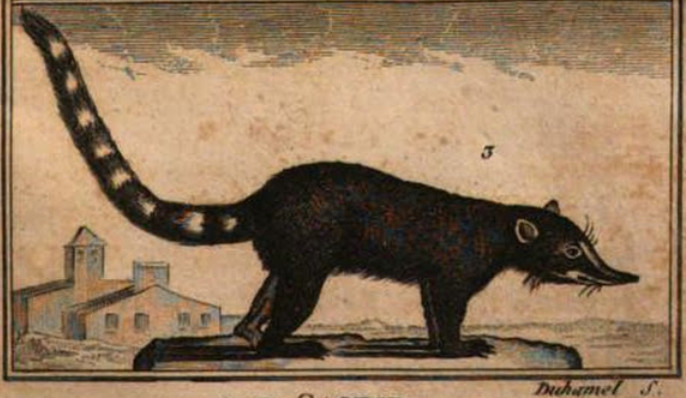
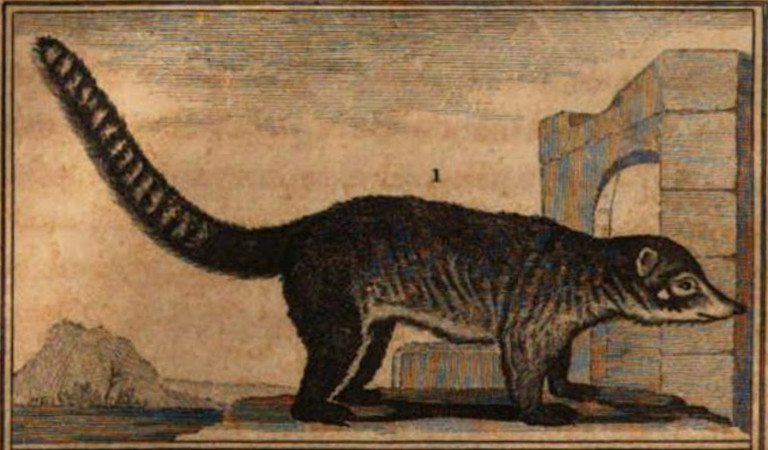
Catton's "Brown Coti", 1788 (left), Buffon's "Coati noiratre" and "Coati brun", 1766
- Plate 27. The Badger – Meles meles.
- Plate 28. The Otter – Lutra lutra.
- Plate 29. The Beaver – describing Castor canadensis, the North American beaver. The Eurasian beaver had been extirpated in Britain by then.
- Plate 30. The Glutton – Gulo gulo, wolverine.
- Plate 31. The Armadillo – Catton describes the armadillo generally.
- Plate 32. The Bombay Squirrel – if Catton is referring merely to a colour variation from Pennant's squirrel (rather than suggesting a different species) then Ratufa indica, the Indian giant squirrel, has been proposed.
- Plate 33. The Peccary – species of peccary unidentifiable.
- Plate 34. The Porcupine – Hystrix cristata was Sparrman's crested porcupine; maybe also describing Old World porcupines more broadly.
- Plate 35. The Hippopotamus – Hippopotamus amphibius.
- Plate 36. The Crocodile – Crocodylus niloticus, Nile crocodile, and crocodiles generally.

== Naturalists and others mentioned ==
This is a partial list of people mentioned in the book.

- Sir Joseph Banks – Joseph Banks (Note: Banks had Catton's book in his library.)
- "Mr. Brook's Menagerie" – Joshua Brookes (or Brooke) had a famous menagerie in London
- Mr. Buffon – Georges-Louis Leclerc, Comte de Buffon
- Captain Cook – Captain James Cook. (Note: von Archenholtz notes that Catton (among others) did paintings for Cook but did not accompany him on his voyages.)
- Mr. Gmelin – Johann Georg Gmelin the discoverer of the musk deer.
- Hernandez – Francisco Hernández de Toledo
- Kaempfer – Engelbert Kaempfer
- Kolben – Peter Kolbe
- Mr. Parkinson – James Parkinson (1730–1813), set up his museum in 1786 when he bought up the contents of the Leverean museum when Sir Ashton Lever went bankrupt
- Mr. Pennant – Thomas Pennant
- Mr. Shaw – George Shaw
- Mr. Sparman – Anders Sparrman

== Other relevant material ==
The University of Delaware has information on coloured printing and colour printing.

Illustrations from a different example of the 1788 edition, once owned by the Duke of Gloucester. (Note: Prince Henry, Duke of Gloucester.)

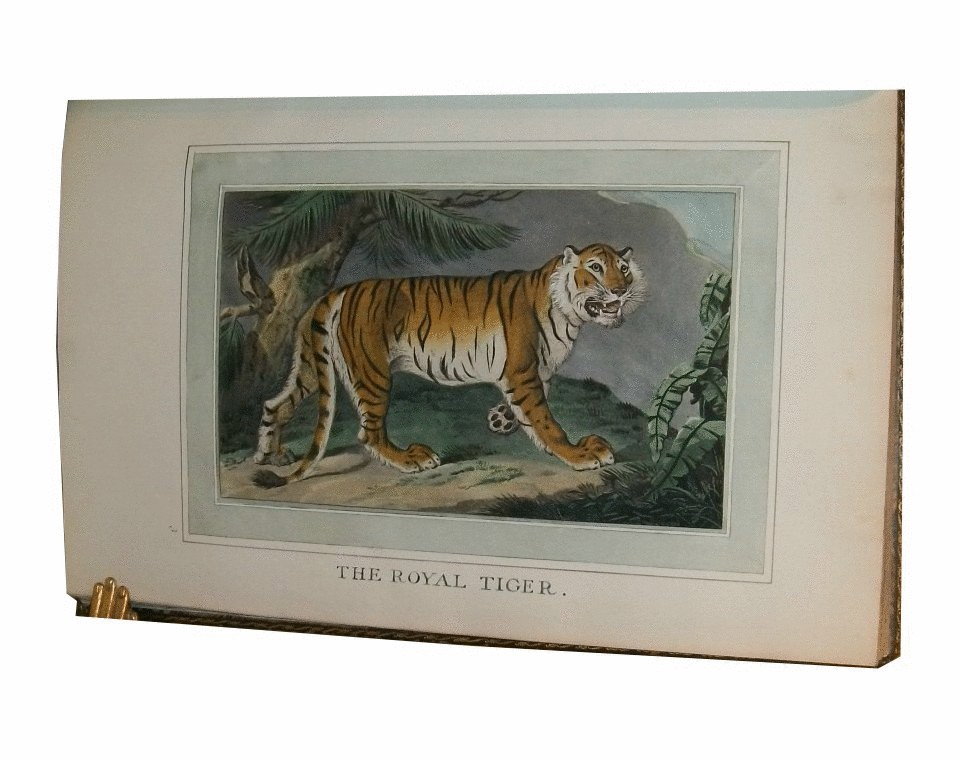
The Royal Tiger

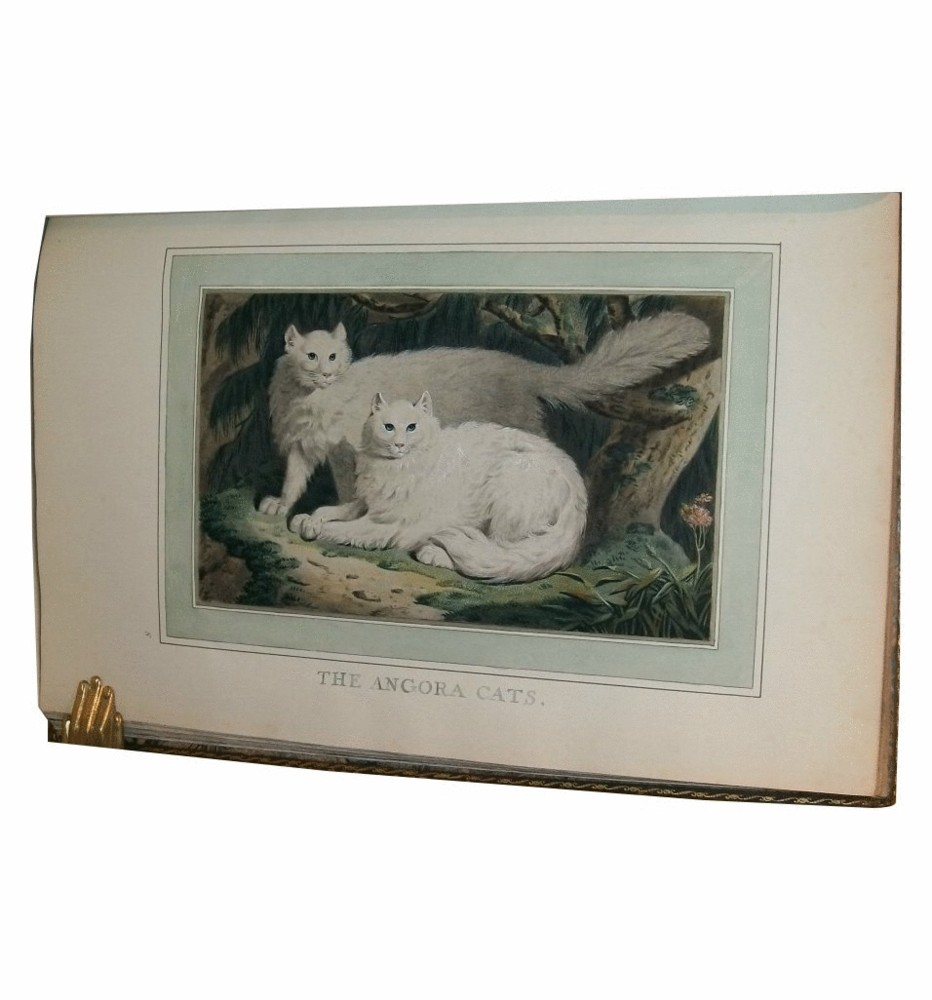
The Angora Cats

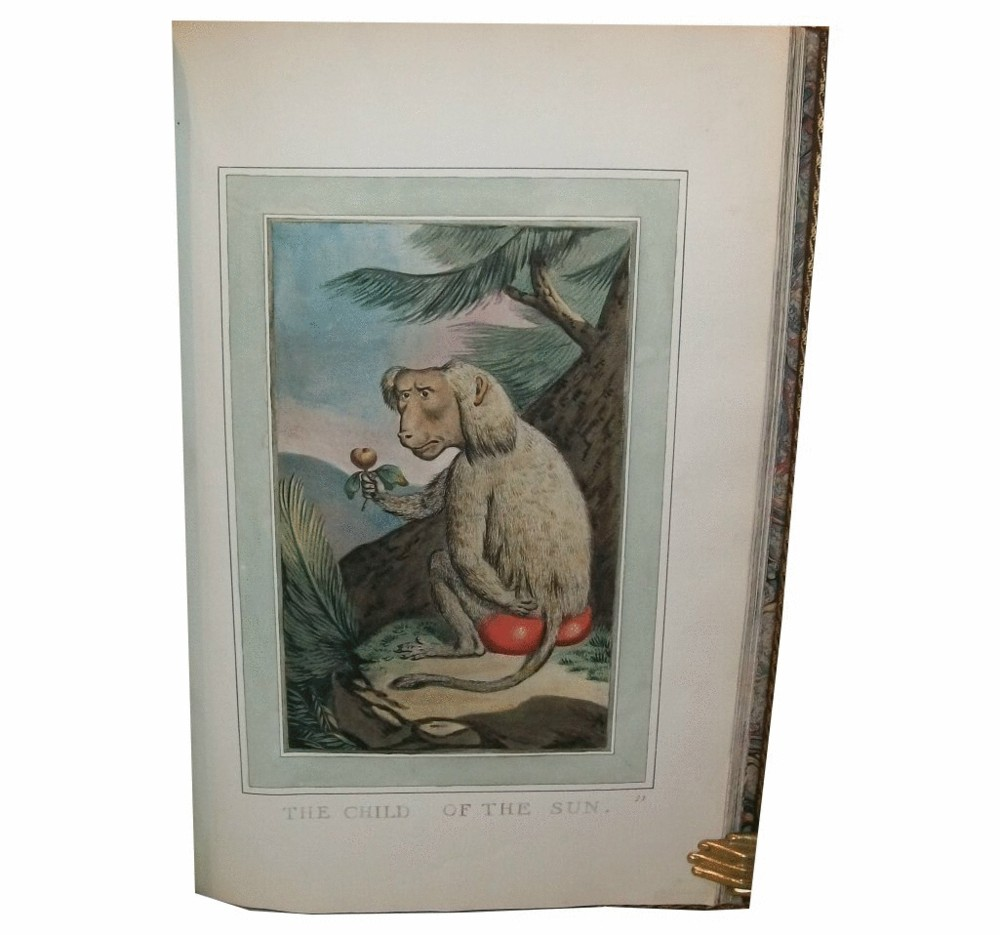
The Child of the Sun
