= Turkish Angora =

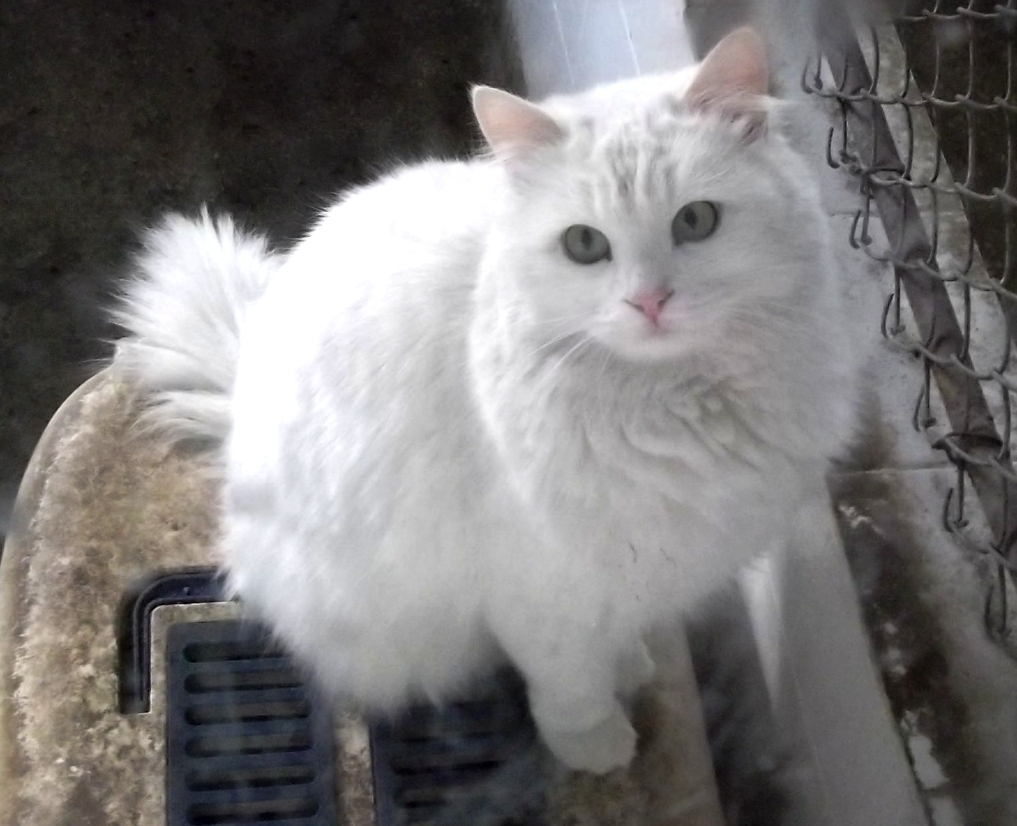
- Turkish Angora cat at the Atatürk Forest Farm and Zoo in Ankara. The zoo breeds and sells Turkish Angora cats.
- Other names: Ankara
- Origin: Turkey

Breed standards
- CFA: standard
- FIFe: standard
- TICA: standard
- ACFA/CAA: standard
- CCA-AFC: standard

The Turkish Angora (Turkish: Ankara kedisi, 'Ankara cat') is a breed of domestic cat. Turkish Angoras are one of the ancient, natural breeds of cat, having originated in central Anatolia (Ankara Province in modern-day Turkey). The breed has been documented as early as the 17th century. Outside the United States, the breed is usually referred to as simply the Angora or Ankara cat. These cats have slender and elegant bodies.

== History ==
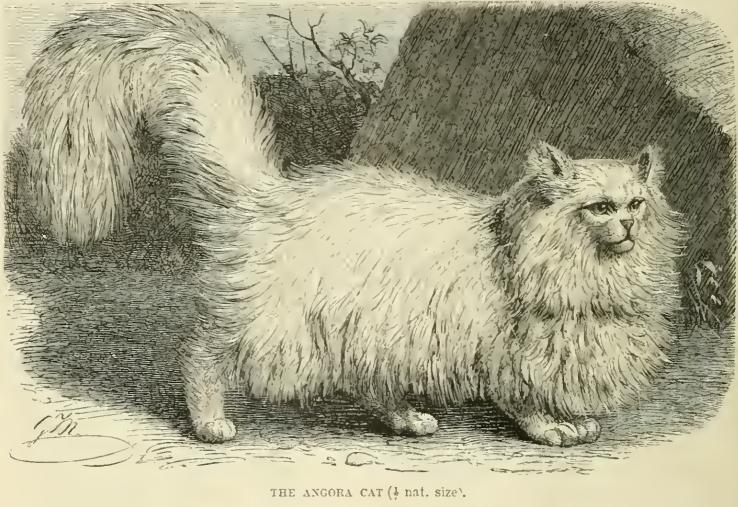
"Angora cat" from Royal Natural History (1894), illustrated by Gustav Mützel

Like all domestic cats, Turkish Angoras descended from the African wildcat (Felis lybica). Their ancestors were among the cats that were first domesticated in the Fertile Crescent.

Longhaired cats were imported to Britain and France from Asia Minor, Persia and Russia as early as the late 16th century. The Turkish Angora was recognised as a distinct breed in Europe by the 17th century. However, there is a strong connection between Angoras and Persians. Charles Catton, in the 1788 book Animals Drawn from Nature and Engraved in Aqua-tinta, gave "Persian cat" and "Angora cat" as alternative names for the same breed.

There is a lot of similarity between Angora and Persian cat. Angora by British and American . In 1903, Frances Simpson wrote in The Book of the Cat:

In classing all long-haired cats as Persians I may be wrong, but the distinctions, apparently with hardly any difference, between Angoras and Persians are of so fine a nature that I must be pardoned if I ignore the class of cat commonly called Angora, which seems gradually to have disappeared from our midst. Certainly, at our large shows there is no special classification given for Angoras, and in response to many inquiries from animal fanciers I have never been able to obtain any definite information as to the difference between a Persian and an Angora.

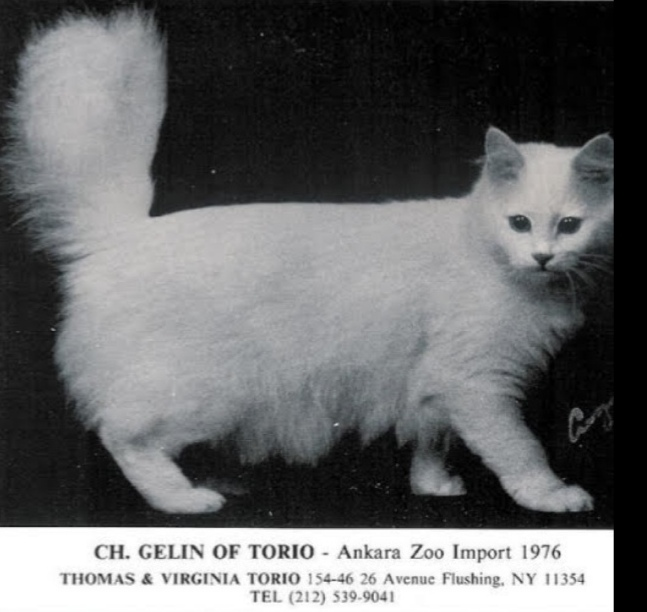
Imported white Turkish Angora from Ankara to New York (1976)

The Angora of the 20th century was used for improvement in the Persian coat, but the type has always been divergent from the Persian—particularly as the increasingly flat-faced show cat Persian has been developed in the last few decades.

In the early 20th century, Atatürk Forest Farm and Zoo began a breeding program to protect and preserve pure white Angoras. The zoo particularly prized odd-eyed specimens; however, the cats were chosen only for their colour – no other criterion was applied.

The Turkish Angora, which was brought to Canada in 1963, was accepted as a championship pedigreed breed in 1973 by the Cat Fanciers' Association. However, until 1978 only white Angoras were recognised. Today, all North American registries accept the Turkish Angora in many colours and patterns. While their numbers are still relatively small, the gene pool is continually growing.

== Characteristics ==
=== Appearance ===
The Angora has a silky coat that covers a long muscular body. Though it is known for a shimmery white coat and posh tail, Turkish Angoras can display a variety of coat colours, with the only disallowed coats being chocolate, lavender, or colourpoint. The Angora's head is small to medium in size with a smooth wedge. The body is long and slender, with good fineness of the bone.

Eyes are large and almond shaped. The colour may be blue, green, amber, yellow, as well as heterochromatic. Ears are pointed, large and wide-set. The eyes are almond shaped, and the profile forms two straight planes. The plumed tail is often carried upright, perpendicular to the back.

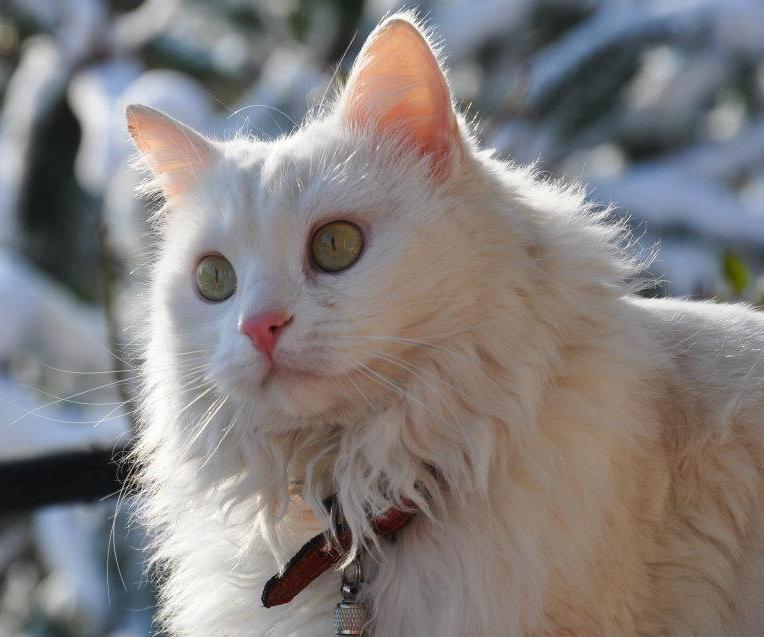
Solid-white adult with green eyes

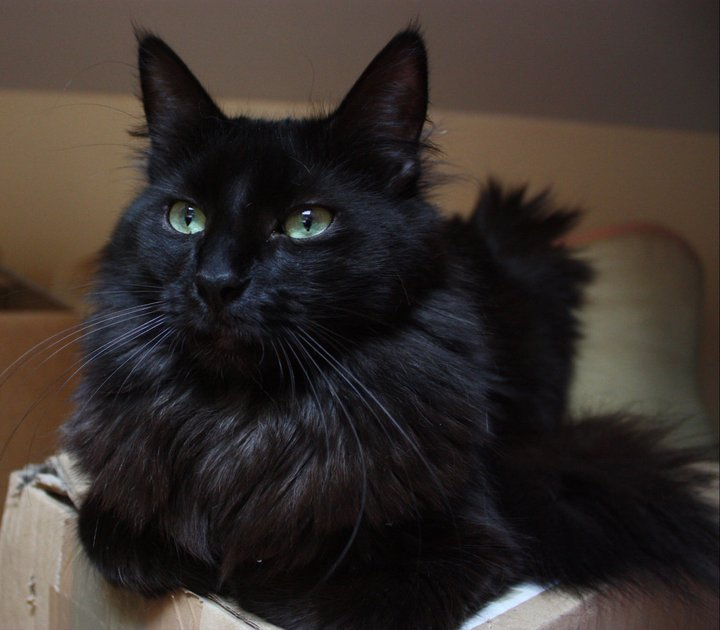
Turkish Angora with black fur and green eyes

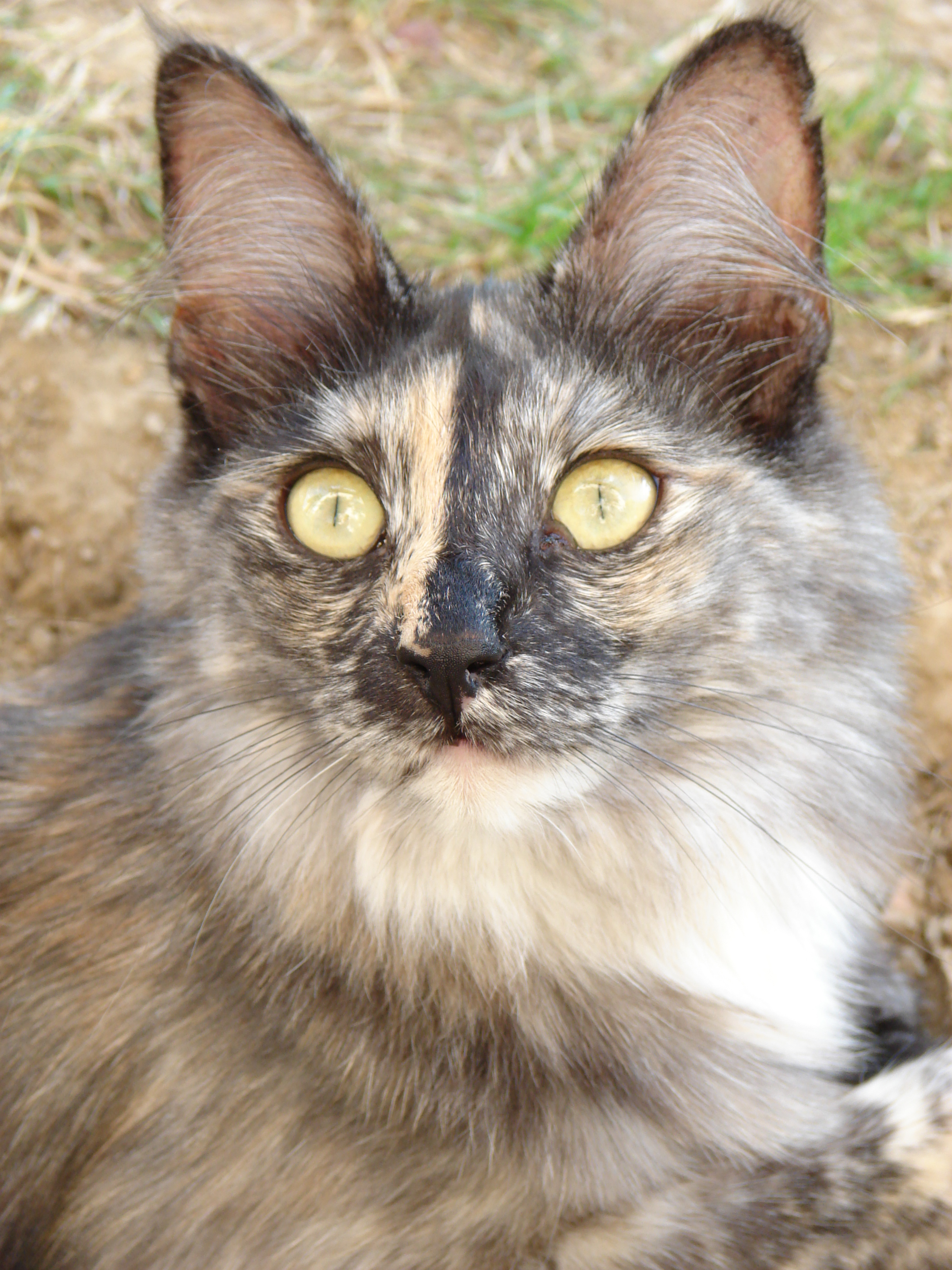
Black tortoiseshell smoke adult

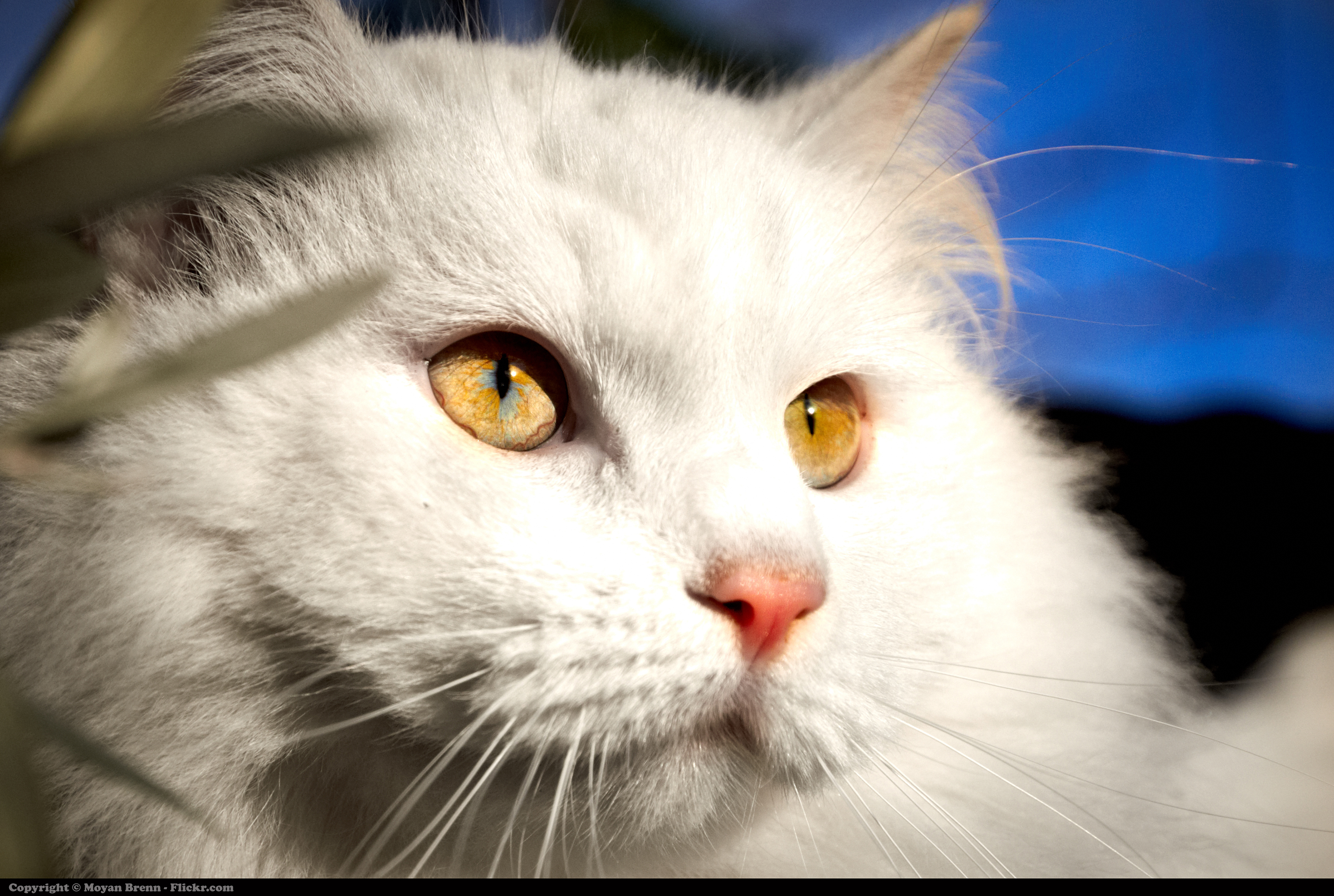
Turkish Angora with hazel eyes

=== Behaviour ===
Turkish Angoras are playful, intelligent, athletic and involved. They bond with humans, but often select a particular member of a family to be their constant companion, whom they are very protective of.

== Health ==
The gene responsible for blue eyes and white coat in the Angora can cause deafness. There have been reports of kittens suffering from ataxia as well as adult cats with hypertrophic cardiomyopathy.

== Genetic variations ==
Comparison of standards

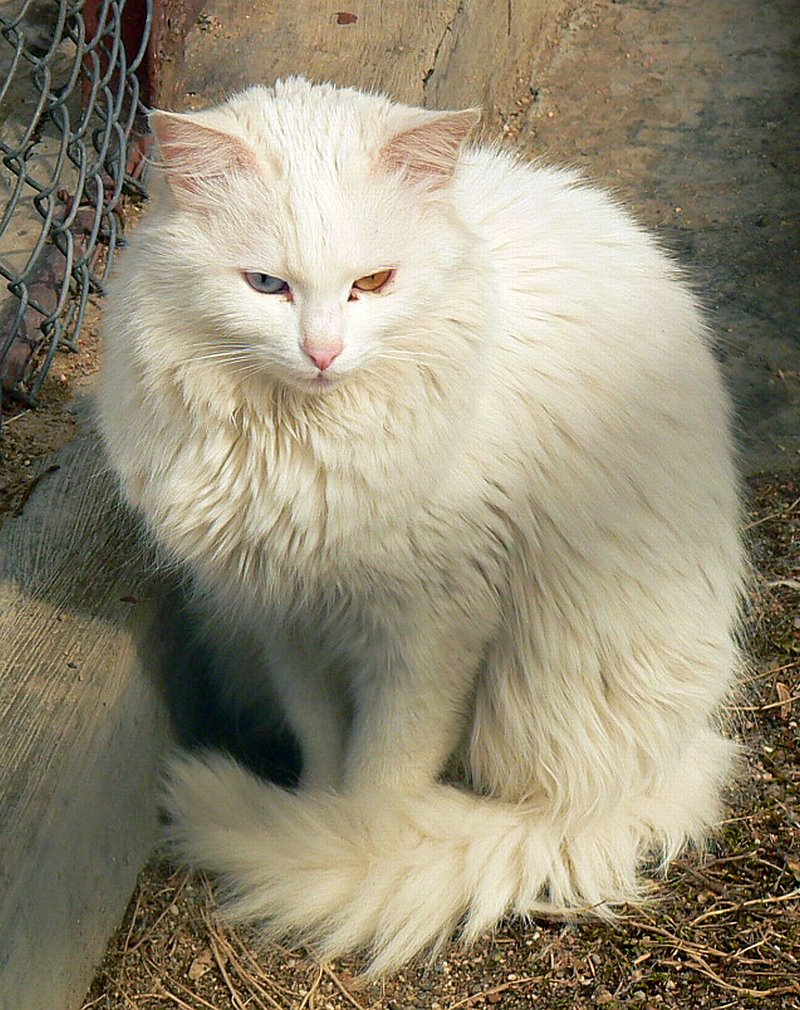
Turkish-type cat in Ankara Zoo

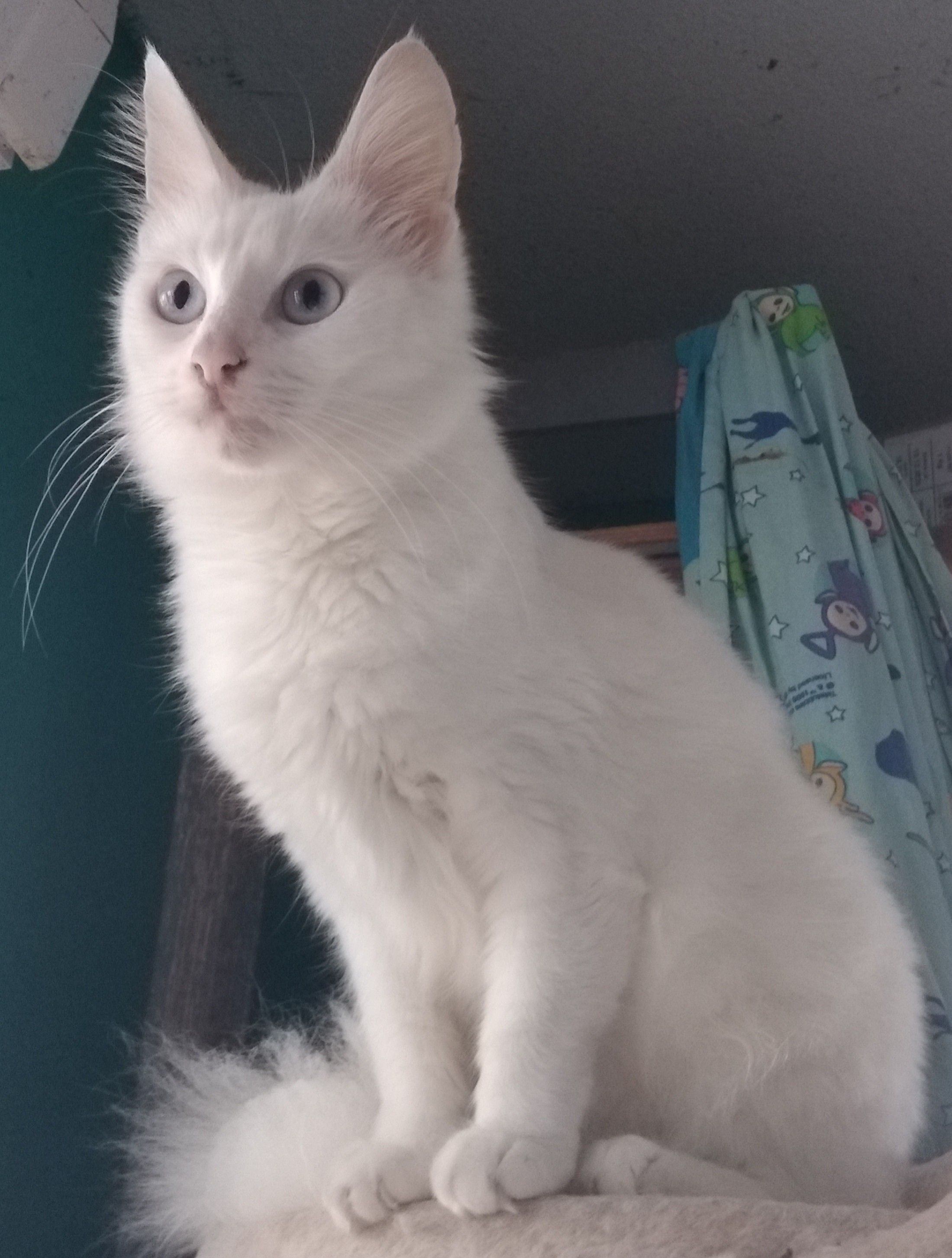
Western-type Grand Champion show cat

Breeders in Turkey feel that the cat's fine-boned version of its natural breed is unrepresentative of the true Turkish cats, which are much sturdier. American "Turkish" Angoras have only a minimal remnant of the original Atatürk Forest Farm and Zoo DNA, and are only "purebred on paper".

A genetic study of pedigree cat breeds (using DNA taken from pedigreed cats in the U.S. and Europe) and worldwide random-bred populations showed the Turkish Van as a distinct population from the Turkish Angora despite their geographical association. The Turkish Angora was grouped with the pedigreed Egyptian Mau and random-bred Tunisian cats. Turkish random-bred cats were grouped with Israeli random-bred cats, while the Turkish Van was grouped with Egyptian random-bred cats. However, the UC Davis studied only American cat fancy registered Angoras rather than the "true" Turkish Angora or Ankara Kedisi directly from Turkey, and especially from the Ankara Zoo.

A genetic study published in 2012 included a few cats imported from Turkey. The study found that "Turkish-versus USA-originating Turkish Angoras ... are resolved as separate breed populations." The American Turkish Angoras are categorised as descendants of European random-bred cats, and cats imported from Turkey "were assigned to the Eastern Mediterranean" group.
