= Atatürk Forest Farm and Zoo =

Forest farm and zoo in Ankara, Turkey

- Forest Farm (1925–1938); Gazi Forest Farm (1938–1950)
- Atatürk Orman Çiftliği ve Hayvanat Bahçesi
- Interactive map of Atatürk Forest Farm and Zoo
- Type: Forest farm, zoo
- Location: Ankara, Turkey
- Coordinates: 39.94015°N 32.79582°E
- Created: 1925 (Forest farm); 1933 (Zoo)
- Website: aoc.gov.tr

Atatürk Forest Farm and Zoo (Turkish: Atatürk Orman Çiftliği ve Hayvanat Bahçesi, in short AOÇ) is an expansive recreational farming area, which houses a zoo, several small agricultural farms, greenhouses, restaurants, a dairy farm and a brewery in Ankara, Turkey. The farm and the zoo are under the administration of the Ministry of Agriculture and Village Affairs.

== Forest farm ==
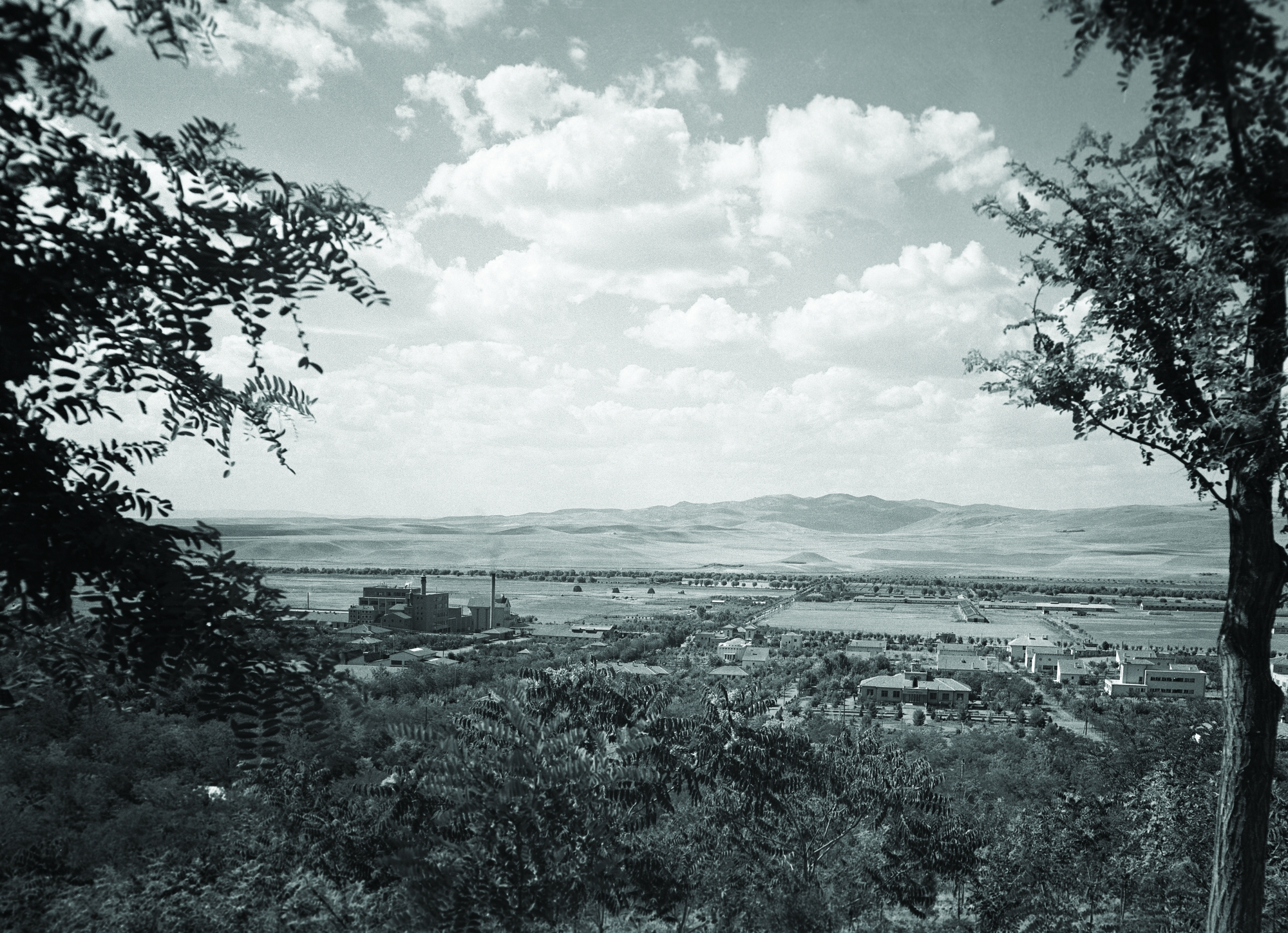
Gazi Forest Farm in 1939

The Forest Farm was established in 1925 by Mustafa Kemal Atatürk, the first President of the Turkish Republic, as a private farm. After 1926, the management of the farm was offered to Spiritual Christians from Russia living in north Kars Province who were noted for animal breeding (Malakan horse, Malakan cow) but who refused repatriation to the Soviet Union. They declined to move to Ankara, because the most zealous believed they must live close to Mount Ararat for the Second Coming of Christ. In 1937, Atatürk donated the farm to the Turkish state. At the farm is an exact replica of the house where Atatürk was born circa 1881 in Selânik.

Visitors to the farm can sample the products of the farm such as old-fashioned beer, fresh dairy products, ice cream, and meat rolls and kebabs made on charcoal, at a traditional restaurant (Merkez Lokantası, Central Restaurant) and other areas of catering around the farm.

== Zoo ==
The Ankara Zoo (Turkish: Ankara Hayvanat Bahçesi) is a 32-hectare (79-acre) zoological garden founded in 1933 (39.9459699°N 32.791099°E). It houses some big cats, various birds, monkeys, apes, ungulates, snakes, and an aquarium. The zoo also breeds and sells Angora cats.

== Recent controversies and disputes ==
The current Presidential Complex has been constructed on part of the territory of the forest farm, and this issue has caused substantial legal and political disputes in Turkey. According to recent reports, Turkey's Public Housing Development Administration (TOKİ) is planning to sell some of the farm lands in an auction.
