= Charles Catton the younger =

British artist (1756–1819)

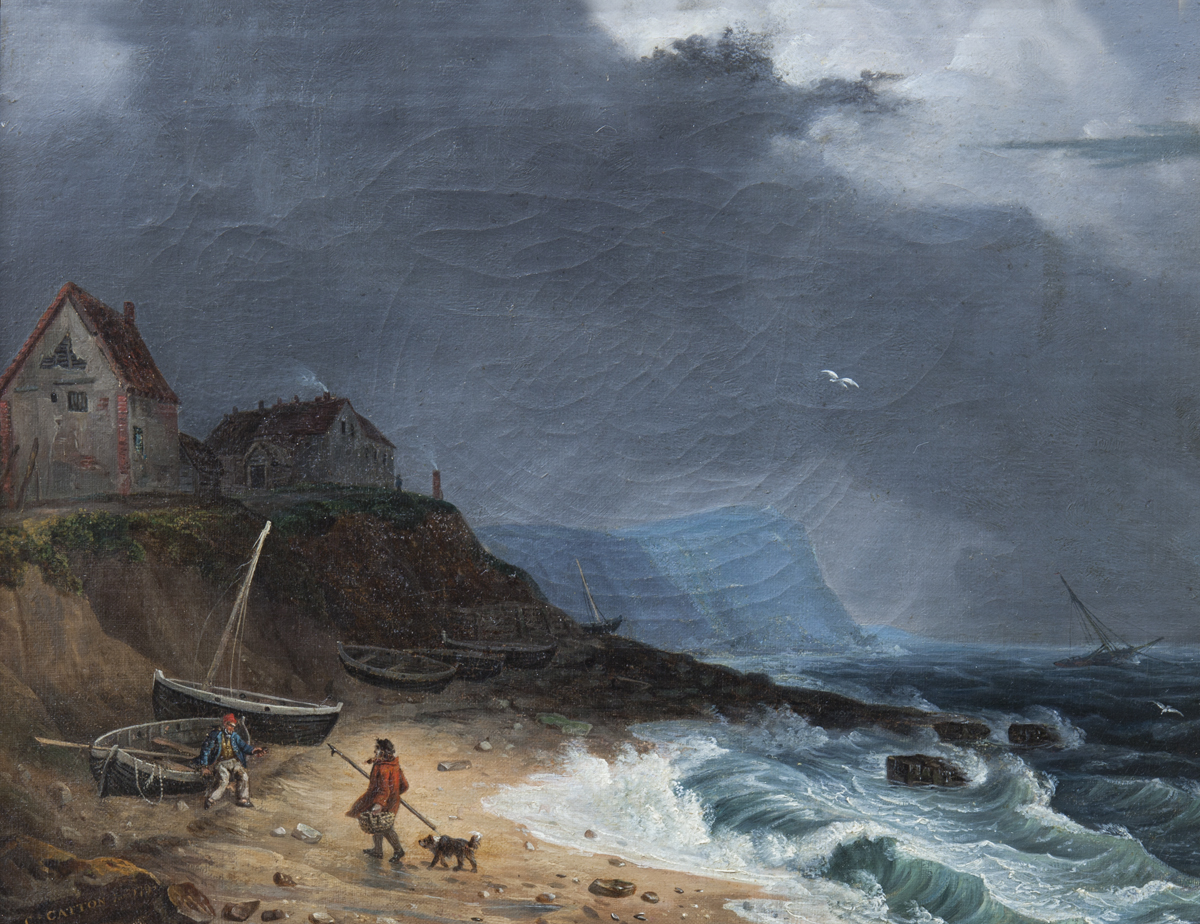
Landscape by Catton of 1794 – Sheringham beach, Norfolk

Charles Catton the younger (30 December 1756 – 24 April 1819) was an English-born American topographical artist, illustrator, theatrical scene-painter, and slave-owner.

== Life and work ==
Catton, was born in London, the son of Charles Catton the elder. He received art tuition from his father and also studied at the Royal Academy schools. He travelled extensively through England and Scotland, making sketches, some of which were afterwards engraved and published. He was known as a scene-painter for the theatre, and also as a topographical artist.

At the Royal Academy in 1775 he exhibited a View of London from Blackfriars Bridge, and one of Westminster from Westminster Bridge. In 1793, he showed designs, along with fellow artist E A Burney, for John Gay's Fables, which were subsequently published. At the Royal Academy from 1776 to 1800 he exhibited 37 works in total. In the latter, he was recorded as living in Purley. From 1781 to 1794, he was a scene painter at Covent Garden.

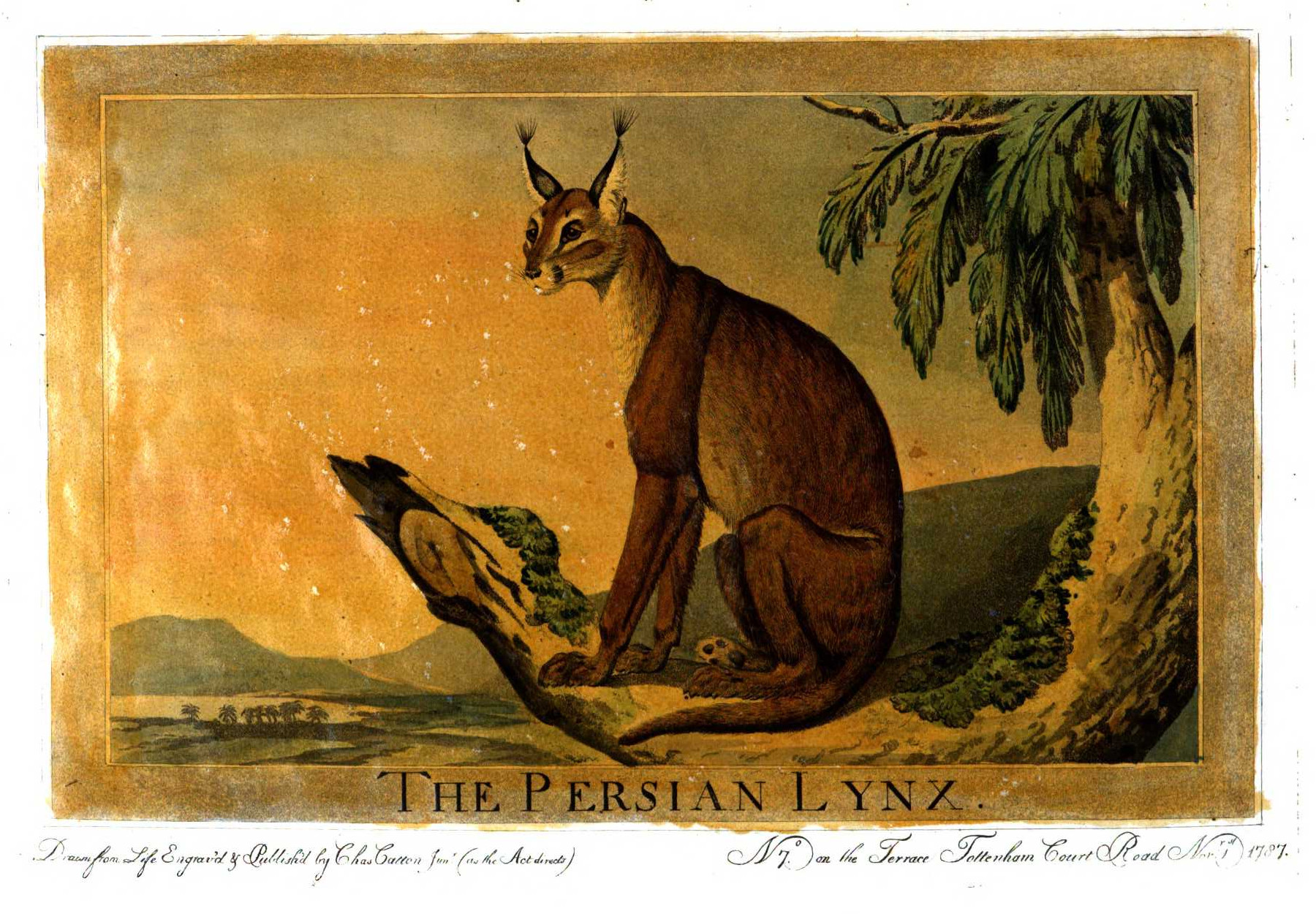
The Lynx (caracal) from Catton's 1788 book

In 1788 he published an early book of coloured aquatints, Animals Drawn from Nature and Engraved in Aqua-tinta. The book included images and descriptions, written and etched by Catton, of thirty-six animals from around the world.

He emigrated to the United States in 1804 and settled in a farm on the River Hudson with his two daughters and a son. There he lived until his death, painting occasionally. He is said to have "acquired wealth"' through his painting. He was also a slave owner. In 1815, he severely beat his slave, Robert, who was engaged in a relationship with Sojourner Truth, herself at the time enslaved on a neighboring farm. Catton died on 24 April 1819.

== Bibliography ==
- Catton, Charles Jr (1788). Animals drawn from Nature and engraved in aqua-tinta. London: I. and J. Taylor.
- Truth, Sojurner (1850). Olive Gilbert (ed.). The Narrative of Sojurner Truth.
