= Miniature Lop =

Breed of rabbit

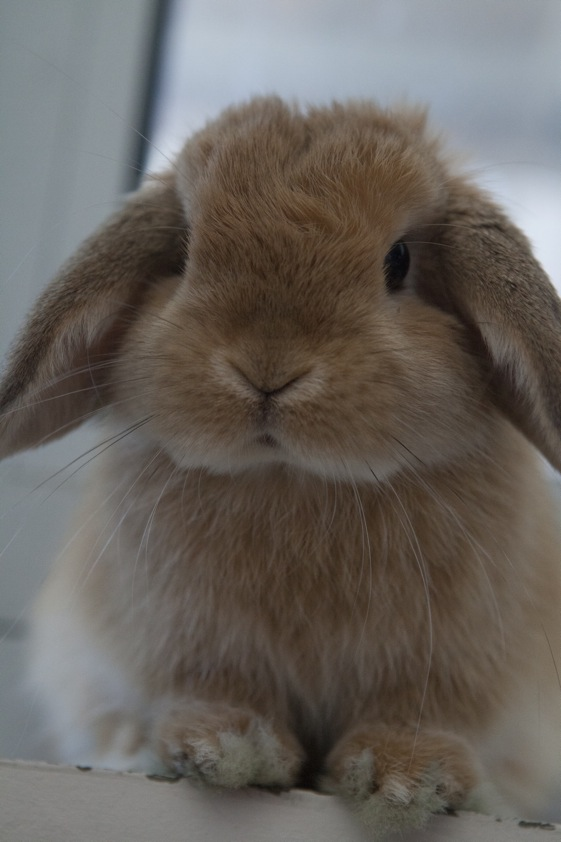
A fawn colored Miniature Lop

Miniature Lop is a breed of domestic rabbit recognised by the British Rabbit Council (BRC). Confusion arises because, in the UK, the Miniature Lop is often commonly called (for short) the Mini Lop. It is, however, a different breed from the Mini Lop that is recognized by the American Rabbit Breeders Association (ARBA). The BRC-recognized Miniature Lop is most similar to the ARBA-recognized Holland Lop. The Miniature Lop is also similar to several other small rabbit breeds.

== History ==
The Miniature Lop in Britain is a relatively new rabbit breed, and it is descended from the first dwarf lops that were developed in the Netherlands during the 1970s. These are now called, in the US, the Holland Lop, but in the Netherlands, they are known as the Miniature Lop.

A Dutch rabbit breeder, Adriann de Cock, is generally credited with developing in late 1949 the dwarf lop breeds, by crossing the French Lop (one of the largest of the lop breeds) with the tiny Netherland Dwarf. Years of hard work paid off to produce the smallest of the lop breeds, and Holland Lops of approximately 2–2.5 kilograms (4.4–5.5 lb) were first shown in 1964.

In 1970, the Holland Lop breed society, composed of 12 breeders in the Netherlands, was established by Adriann de Cock, with the aim of breeding Holland Lops down to 1.5 kilograms (3.3 lb). Ten years later, these smaller Holland Lops were imported to Britain by George Scott of Yorkshire via a Dutch contact. After years of selective breeding among the smallest specimens, a new breed was developed and named the Miniature Lop, which was recognised by the British Rabbit Council in 1994, with a maximum weight of 1.6 kilograms (3.5 lb).

== Weight ==
	Ideal	Maximum
Adult	1.2–1.5 kg (2 lb 10 oz – 3 lb 5 oz)	1.6 kg (3 lb 8 oz)
Junior under 5 months		3.0 lbs

Females usually grow larger than the male.

== Appearance ==
Coat - The coat to be dense and of good length, rollback with an abundance of guard hairs. Legs and pads to be well furred.

Head, Crown and Eyes - The head is bold, broad and well developed. The profile of the head is strongly curved with a good width between the eyes, full cheeks and a broad muzzle. The eyes are bold, bright and large. The basal ridge of the ears should appear prominent across the top of the skull to form the crown.

Ears - Should be broad, thick, well furred and rounded at the ends. They should be carried close to the cheeks giving a horseshoe like outline when viewed from the front. The inside of the ears should not be visible from any angle when carried correctly.

== Color ==
Agouti, Black, Blue, Brown, Butterfly, Chinchilla, Fawn, Fox, Opal, Orange, Sable Marten, Sealpoint, Siamese Sable, Siamese Smoke, Sooty Fawn, Steel, White

== Lifespan ==
The expected lifespan of this rabbit is between 7 and 14 years, but they can live up to 18 years if properly cared for.

== Gallery ==
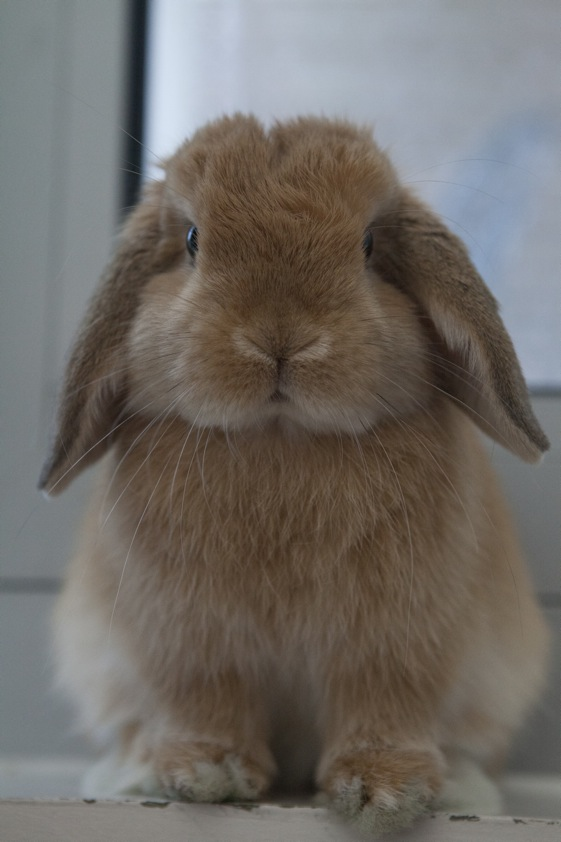
An orange coloured Miniature Lop - Front View

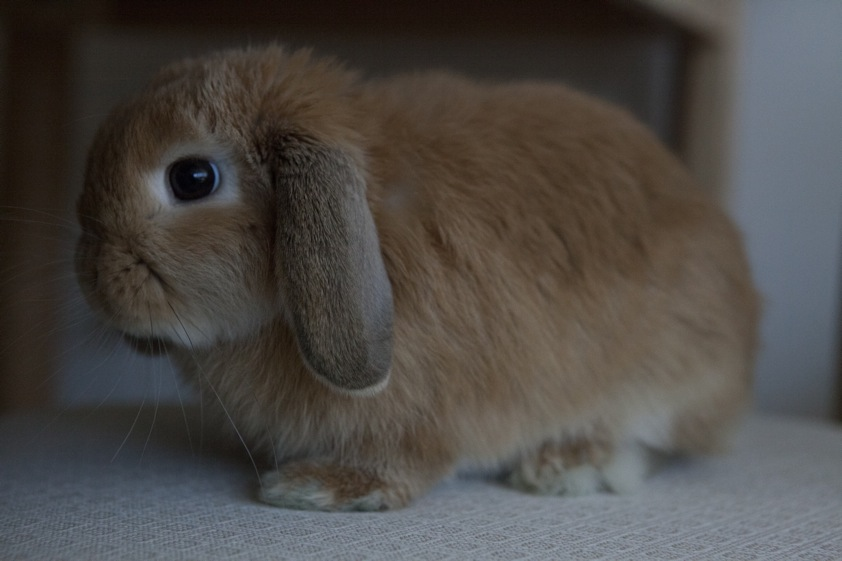
An orange coloured Miniature Lop - Side View

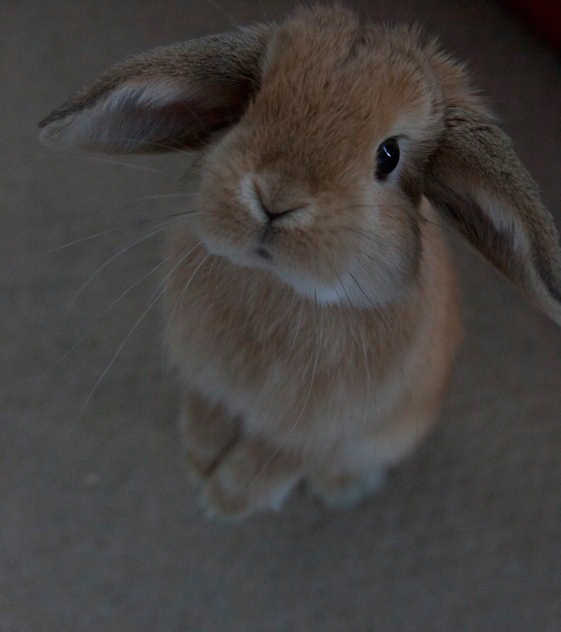
An orange coloured Miniature Lop - Stood Up

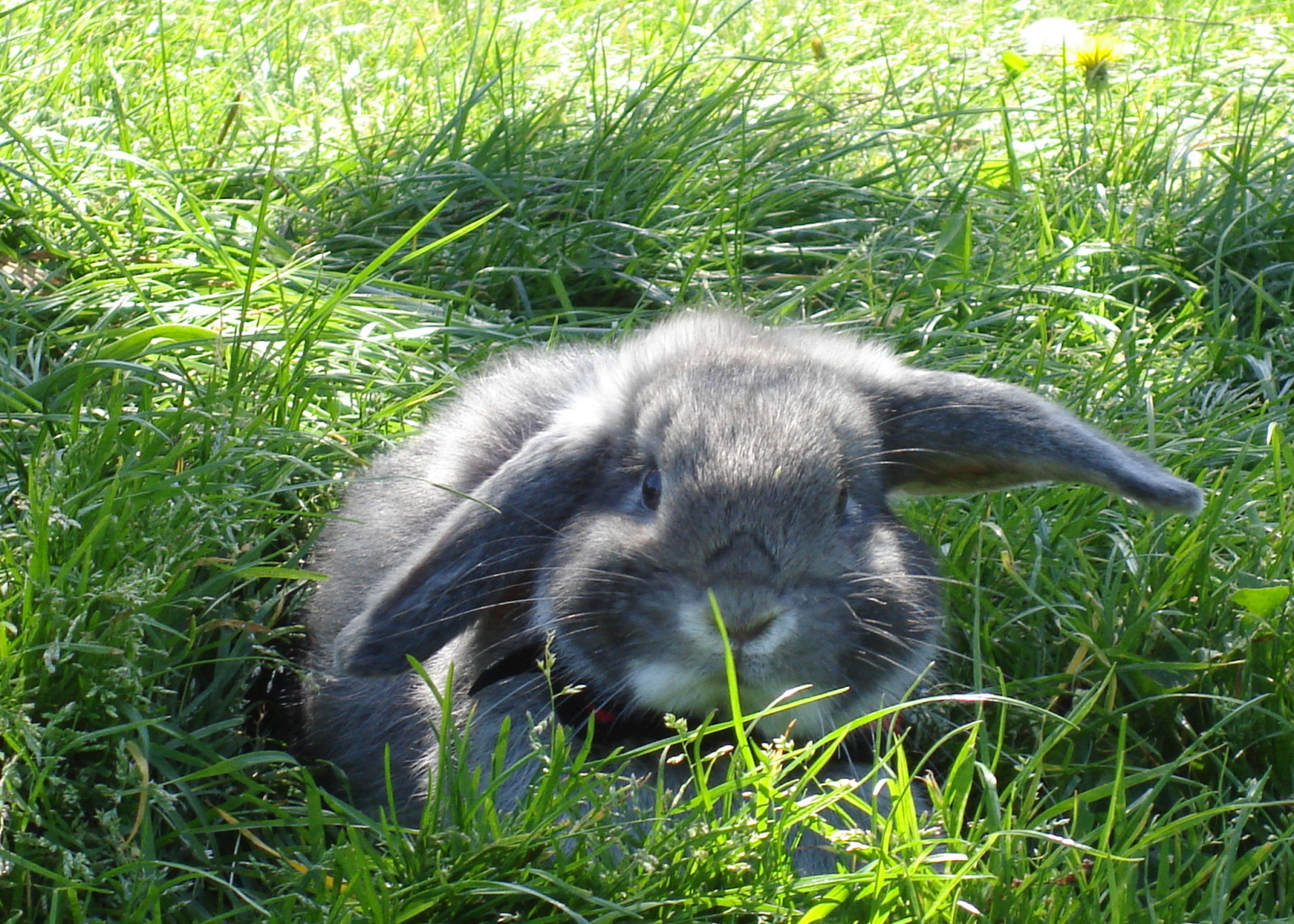
A blue otter colored Miniature Lop - Front view

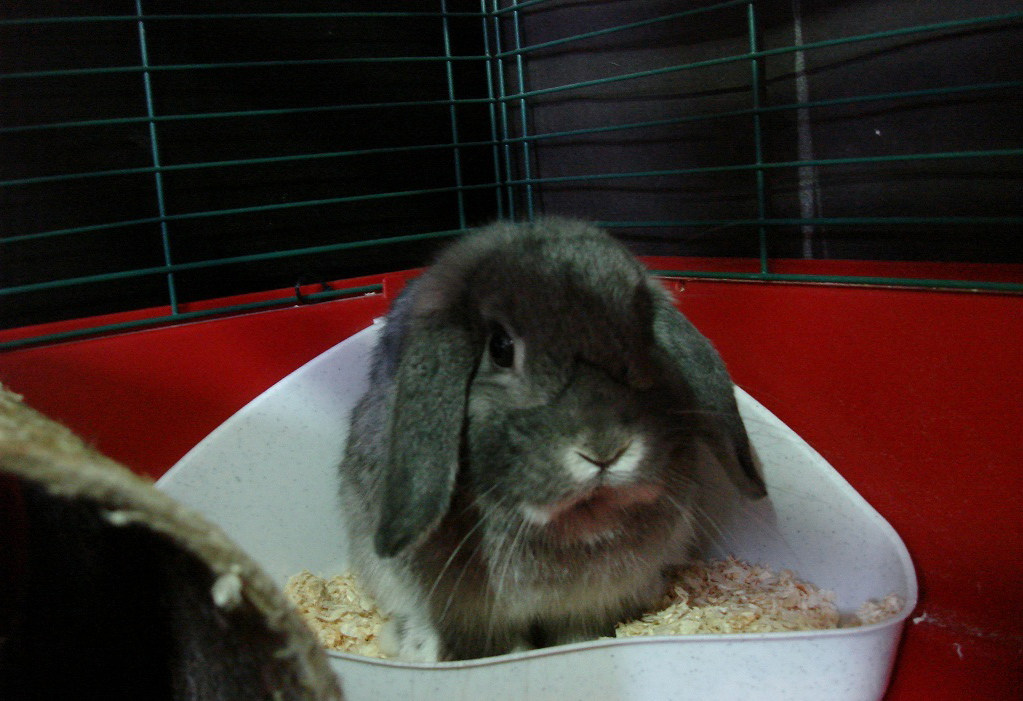
A blue otter colored Miniature Lop

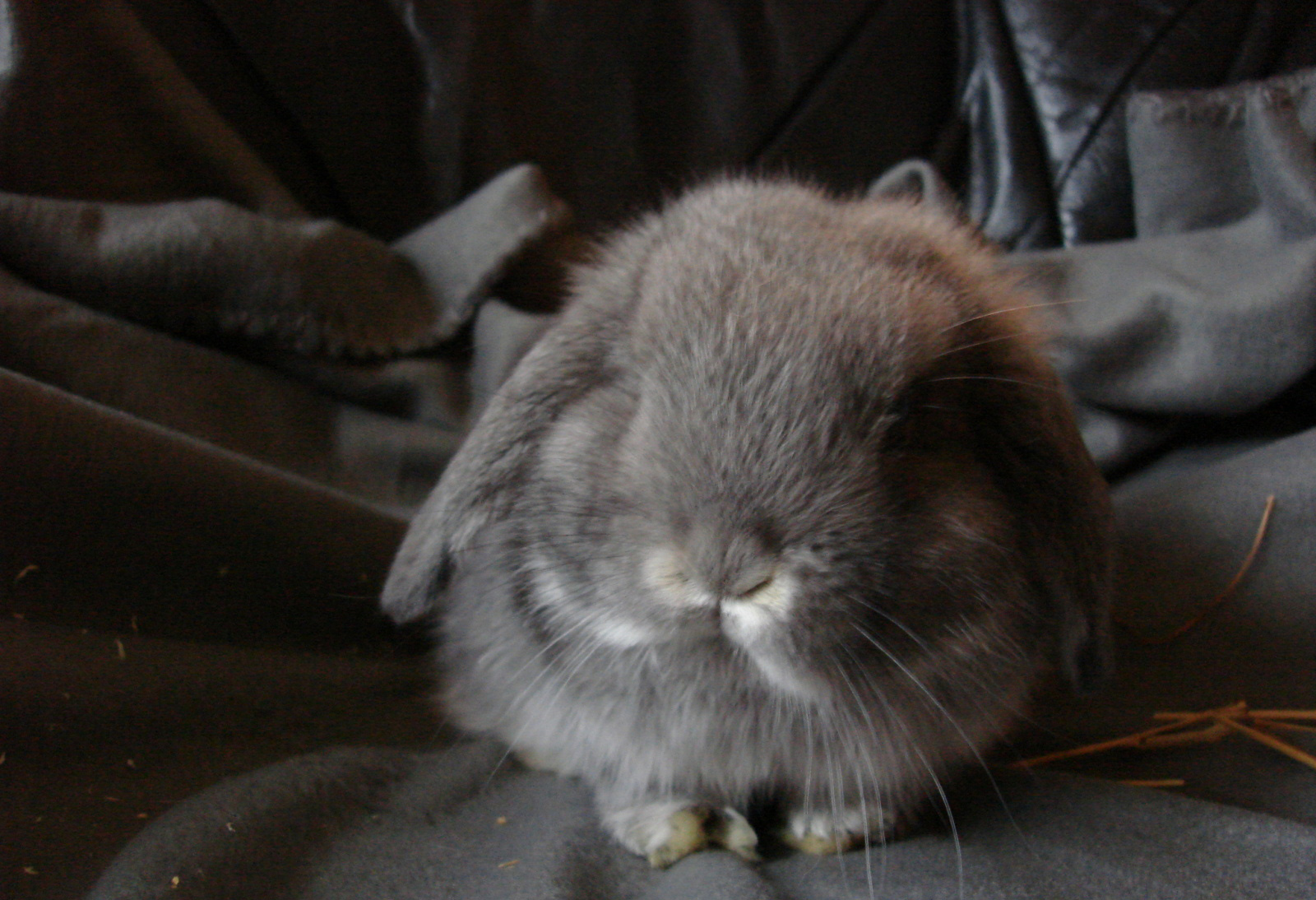
A four-month-old Miniature Lop

== See also ==
- List of rabbit breeds
- Dwarf rabbit
- Lop rabbit
