= American Fuzzy Lop =

Breed of rabbit

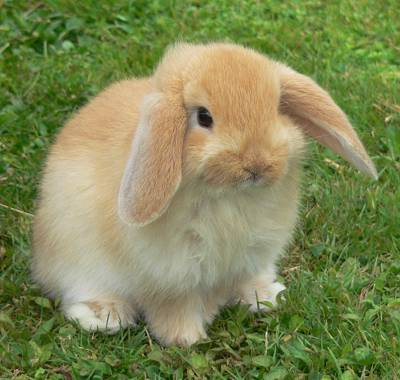
- Conservation status: Not at risk
- Country of origin: United States
- Distribution: Worldwide
- Use: Pet

Traits
- Weight: 3–4 lb (1.4–1.8 kg)
- Coat: Long and wooly
- Wool color: White or Colored; Natural or Dyed
- Color: Variety of colors combined with white ('agouti') including chestnut, squirrel chinchilla, lynx, and opal, as well as pointed white
- Distinguishing features: Cat-like short and flat muzzle; distinctive markings on the nose, tinted ears, with eye circles

The American Fuzzy Lop is a rabbit breed recognized by the American Rabbit Breeders Association (ARBA). It is similar in appearance to a Holland Lop. However, the American Fuzzy Lop is a wool breed and will have wool similar to the Angora breeds although the wool will be shorter than that of a commercial Angora. The American fuzzy lop has to weigh up to four pounds in order to be shown.

== History ==
The background of the American Fuzzy Lop is interwoven with the history of the Holland Lop. When first introduced, the Holland Lop rabbit was only available in solid colors, and some breeders wanted to add the broken pattern to the Holland Lop gene pool. To do this, they bred their Holland Lops with English Spots. While they achieved the goal of producing broken pattern rabbits, they failed to keep the rollback fur the Holland must have. The offspring instead had the flyback fur of the English Spot. The breeders then bred Holland Lops with French Angoras, a breed that has a very gentle rollback coat. The result of these manipulations was that the wool gene was also introduced into the Holland Lop gene pool and a Holland with long wool was occasionally found in Holland Lop litters. These were generally sold to people who were enchanted with a small wooled lop-eared rabbit.

The first American Fuzzy Lop breeders, include Patty Greene-Karl and Gary Fellers of the East Coast and Kim Landry and Margaret Miller of the West Coast. These breeders noted the marketability of these fuzzy Hollands. Patty Greene-Karl is credited with realizing that the "fuzzy" gene was recessive, so that mating two Holland Lops carrying this gene resulted in a certain percentage of the offspring (theoretically 25%) with wool. Patty decided to develop these rabbits as a new breed, named the American Fuzzy Lop. After working for four years on the development of Fuzzies, she presented her rabbits to the ARBA for the first showing of the new breed at the 1985 ARBA Convention in Houston, Texas. Three separate standards for wooled lops were received from three different individuals. The original standard called for a maximum weight of 4 ¾ lb with the ideal weight of 3 ¾ lb, a rabbit designed to have the body type, ear carriage, and size of a Holland Lop, combined with a short, easily maintained wool. At the 1986 ARBA Convention in Columbus, Ohio, the American Fuzzy Lop was presented for its second showing, and again passed. At its third showing at the 1987 ARBA Convention in Portland, Oregon, the ARBA Standards Committee did not approve the breed. They stated a lack of uniformity from one animal to another. A new working standard was written by Jeff Hardin at the request of Patty, which was accepted. The revised standard basically described a wooled Holland, calling for a maximum weight of 4 pounds, and an ideal weight of 3½ lb In 1988, ARBA requested only the breed sponsor be allowed to bring her Fuzzy Lops to Convention in Madison, Wisconsin because of limited cage space. The American Fuzzy Lop had to pass that year to become a recognized breed or else its proponents would have to start the procedure all over again. Fortunately, Patty's presentation passed at this Convention, and the American Fuzzy Lop became a new recognized breed. In 1989 in Tulsa, Oklahoma, Helen McKie's "Herbie" was selected as the first Best of Breed (BOB) American Fuzzy Lop at an ARBA Convention. Herbie's picture graced the ARBA Standard of Perfection, 1991–95, representing Fuzzies well but only the American Fuzzy Lop presented by Patty was granted a working standard.

== Appearance and personality ==
The American Fuzzy Lop resembles the Holland Lop with the exception of its wool, the American Fuzzy Lop has the wool of the English Angora. As an adult the American Fuzzy Lop weighs 3-4 lbs with an ideal weight of 3.5 lbs. They have a very compact body, that appears quite muscular. They come in most of the recognized colors. The ears of the American Fuzzy Lop do not stand erect, but rather lop along the side of the face. They have a short and flat muzzle similar to that of a cat.

American Fuzzy Lops are categorized based on their color pattern; either "solid" or "broken" variety. Whites' varieties are further categorized as Ruby Eyed White and Blue Eyed White.

American Fuzzy Lops are an active, playful, social breed with much personality. They enjoy the attention of their owner, as well as the companionship of other rabbits. They enjoy having toys such as plastic balls, pine cones, pieces of soft wood, stuffed socks, or an old glove. The American Fuzzy Lop is the combination of a French Angora and the Holland Lop. They are very fuzzy, as their name indicates, and are popular pets.

== See also ==
- List of rabbit breeds
- Lop rabbit
