= Velveteen Lop =

Breed of rabbit

- Other names: Velveteen rabbit
- Country of origin: United States
- Standard: https://arba.net/wp-content/uploads/2026/03/VelveteenLop1_03_2026.pdf
- Type: semi-arch
- Use: companion, exhibition

Traits
- Weight: Male: 5-7 lbs; Female: 5–7 lbs
- Fur type: rex
- Distinguishing features: lop ears, plush coat

The Velveteen Lop is a breed of lop-eared rabbit developed from Mini Rex and English Lop ancestry in the United States from the late 1980s through early 1990s. It is the first American rabbit breed to combine lopped ears and rex fur. Velveteens are known to have friendly, gentle personalities. They are medium-sized rabbits weighing 5 to 7 pounds when fully grown and come in a wide variety of coat colors.

== History ==
Breeder Virginia Menden began developing the breed in the 1980s, with the goal of creating a rabbit with a semi-arched body shape and fur similar to that of the Mini Rex. Menden named the breed after the children's story The Velveteen Rabbit. The breed has acquired a "Certificate of Development" (the first step towards recognized breed status) several times, making it eligible to be shown at ARBA-sanctioned shows, but against only themselves, and therefore ineligible for Best in Show.

== Appearance ==
The Velveteen Lop's coat should feel short and plush to the touch. The fur is thick, creating a velvet plush-like texture. The coat can be a variety of colors and patterns common in lop rabbits. The overall goal is a rabbit with the fur characteristics of the Mini Rex breed and the build and ear length of an English Lop in a modest size. It should have a semi-arched body shape, and the chest should be full. The head should be wedge-shaped. The ears should be low on the rabbit's head, and should measure at least 14 inches from tip to tip. Healthy rabbits weigh 5 to 7 pounds. Because the Velveteen Lop is in the process of gaining full recognition, size and type may vary slightly.

== Coloration and Markings ==
Acceptable colors for the Velveteen Lop include those listed below.

- Agouti – Variations of "wild colored" rabbits: hair shafts exhibit three or more bands of pigment. The eye circles, belly, under jaw, and underside of tail are cream or off-white. Colors include castor, amber, opal, lynx, and chinchilla (Black, blue, chocolate, lilac, sable chinchilla, smoke pearl chinchilla).
- Self – Self varieties exhibit the same coloration over the entire body and do not have cream or white eye circles, belly, under jaw, or underside of tail. Varieties include black, blue, chocolate, lilac, ruby-eyed white (REW), and blue-eyed white (BEW or Vienna).
- Shaded – Shaded varieties show a gradual transition from the base color on the body to darker coloration on the points like a Siamese cat. Varieties include tortoiseshell (black, blue, chocolate, lilac), seal, sable, sable point, and smoke pearl.
- Ticked – Ticked varieties have the same coloration over the entire body with contrasting guard hairs. Varieties include silver- and gold-tipped steel (black, blue, chocolate, lilac, sable, smoke pearl varieties), frosted pearl (black, blue, chocolate, and lilac), and silver/silver fox (black, blue, brown/agouti, fawn).
- Non-Extension – Non-extension group varieties are orange or cream across the entire body. The eye circles, belly, under jaw, and underside of tail are cream or off-white. Varieties include red, orange, fawn with brown eyes, and cream with blue-gray eyes.
- Pointed White – Pointed white (Himalayan) varieties are white with red eyes and dark points. Varieties include black, blue, chocolate, and lilac pointed white.
- Broken – Brokens consist of any showable color in conjunction with white spots. Brokens also include tricolors in black/orange, blue/fawn, chocolate/orange, and lilac/fawn combinations.
