= Lop =

Lop may refer to:

- Lop County, county in Hotan, Xinjiang, China
- Lop language, a language spoken in Lop County, China
- Lop Desert, a desert in China
- Lop Nur, a group of small, now seasonal salt lake sand marshes
- Lop rabbit, several breeds of rabbits whose ears lie flat

== People with the surname ==
- Ferdinand Lop (1891–1974), French politician

== See also ==
- LOP (disambiguation), a three-letter abbreviation
- Lopburi (disambiguation)
- Lope (disambiguation)
