= Miniature Lion Lop =

Breed of rabbit

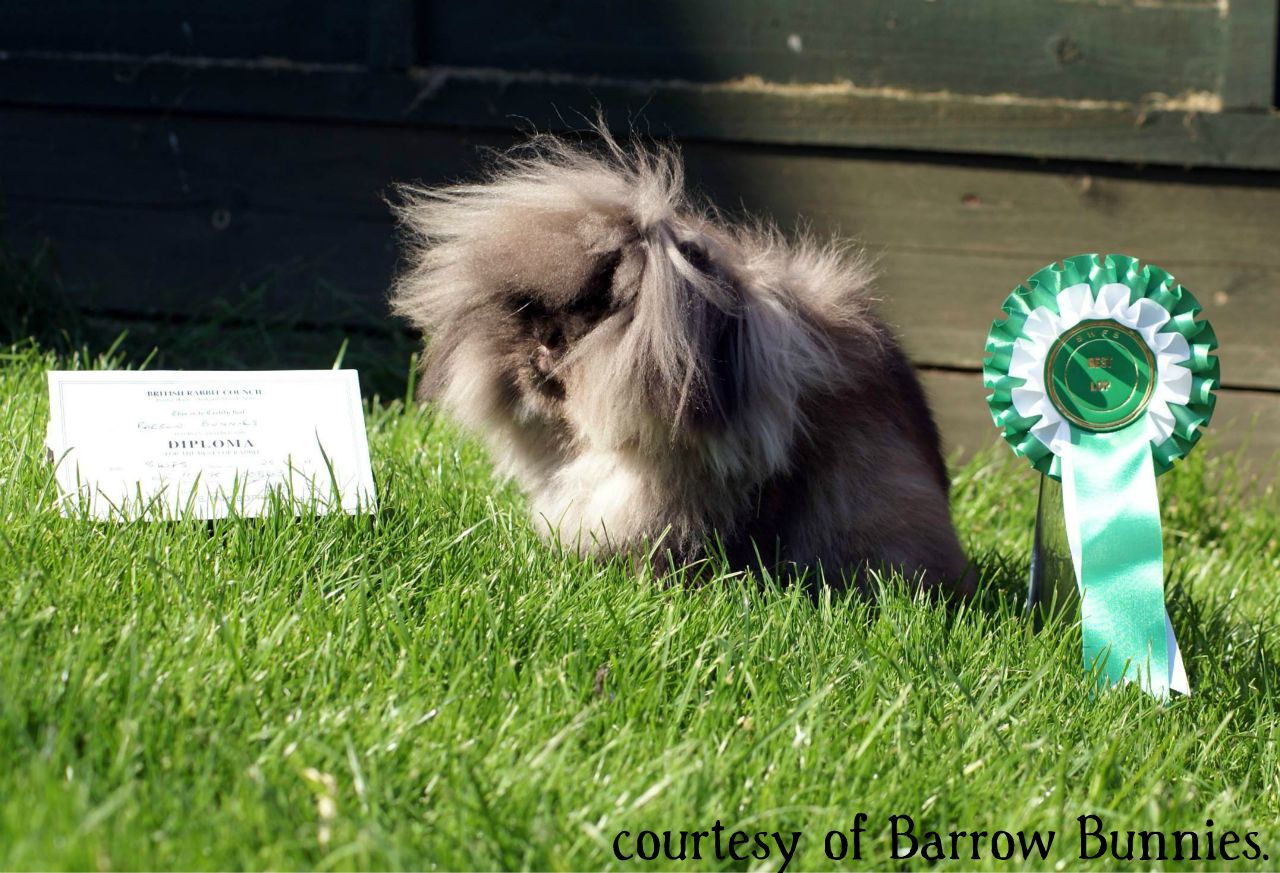
A show-winning Miniature Lion Lop.

The Miniature Lion Lop is a breed of domestic rabbit recognised by the British Rabbit Council. The breed is not currently recognized by the American Rabbit Breeders Association. In addition to its lop ears, the distinguishing feature of this breed is its Lionhead-type mane and its small size: 1.5–1.6 kilograms (3.3–3.5 lb).

The Miniature Lion Lop was developed in England in the early 2000s and accepted by the British Rabbit Council in 2006. Breeder Jane Bramley was responsible for much of the work required to achieve formal breed recognition. The Miniature Lion Lop is similar to the Miniature Lop, but with a mane around the head and a bib on the chest. The breed is growing in popularity within the UK.

== Breeding ==
Ovulation is induced by sexual stimulation. Sexual maturity age for small breeds like the Miniature Lion Lop is 4 to 5 months. Males usually require more time to mature, and normally reach adult sperm counts between 6–7 months.

Due to the territorial nature of female rabbits, it is standard practice for the doe to always be brought to the buck's cage. When the doe is brought to the bucks' cage, he quickly mounts her, performs pelvic thrusting culminating in ejaculation, and "flops" off. The whole act may take less than 30 seconds, and is often repeated several times. When he is finished, the buck should then be removed, but many breeders will reintroduce the buck a few hours later to increase the size of the litter.

A regular pregnancy lasts 31 to 33 days. After 34 days, the chance of stillborn babies increases. Therefore, labor may be induced at 32 days by a vet. One or two days before giving birth, the female will pull out the fur on her chest to make a nest for their young. When in a very threatening or stressful situations, the female may eat their young. Rabbits can get pregnant almost immediately after they have given birth.

== Mane ==
The maning gene is dominant, therefore, both parents do not need a mane to pass it on to offspring; however, one parent must have a mane. It cannot be "carried" by Mini Lops. There are two genes involved – 'M' and 'm'.

- The mm would be a rabbit with no mane (so this would be a Mini Lop).
- The Mm would be a rabbit with a single mane.
- The MM would be a rabbit with a double mane.

So some possible outcomes may be:

- mm × mm = 100% mm, so all Mini Lop offspring in the litter.
- mm × Mm = 50% mm and 50% Mm, so half Mini Lop and half single-maned Mini Lion Lop offspring in the litter.
- mm × MM = 100% Mm, so all single-maned Mini Lion Lop offspring in the litter.
- Mm × Mm = 50% Mm, 25% mm, and 25% MM
- Mm × MM = 50% Mm and 50% MM
- MM × MM = 100% MM

Double-maned Mini Lion Lop kits are easily recognisable. They are often informally referred to as "gremlins", because of their appearance. Compared to a single maned kit, there is a large difference. "Gremlins" tend to have a V shape on the back, where the fur starts to grow.

== Colours and standardisation ==
Miniature Lion Lop fanciers are still currently working on getting all the colours standardised, because the Breeds Standards Committee have not allowed all colours that are accepted by other Lop breeds to be accepted within the Miniature Lion Lops. Three generations (with a minimum of two specimens in each generation) of show-quality Miniature Lion Lops are required in the colour the breeders wish to be accepted.

Colours currently accepted are:

- White (red- or blue-eyed)
- Black
- Blue
- Agouti
- Opal
- Iron grey
- Sooty fawn
- Fawn
- Orange
- Light Siamese sable
- Medium Siamese sable
- Dark Siamese sable
- Siamese smoke
- Black fox
- Black otter
- Steel
- Beige
- Chocolate
- Seal-point
- Blue-point
- Butterfly pattern
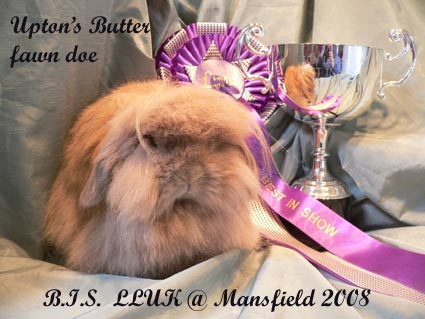
Upton's Butter, fawn Mini Lion Lop. BiS LLUK Mansfield 2008

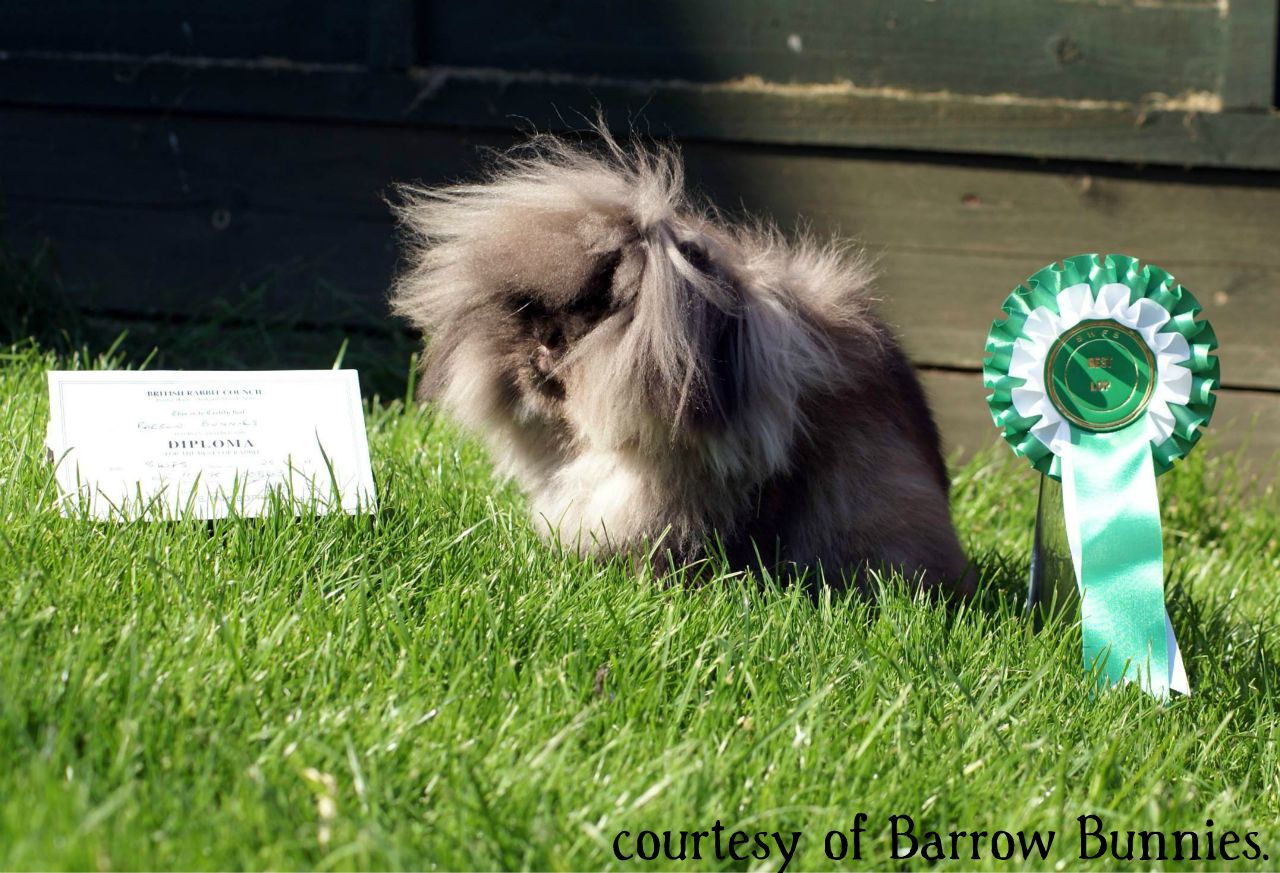
Barrow Bunnies PJ, medium sable Mini Lion Lop. Best Lop Puddletown

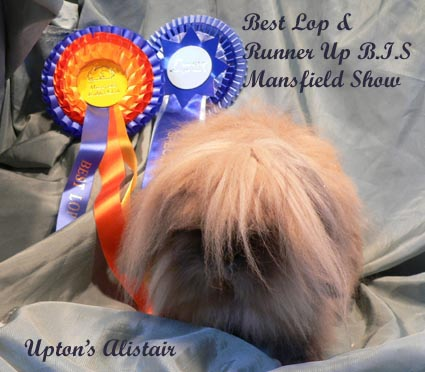
Upton's Alistair, sooty fawn Mini Lion Lop. Best Lop and Runner Up BiS Mansfield

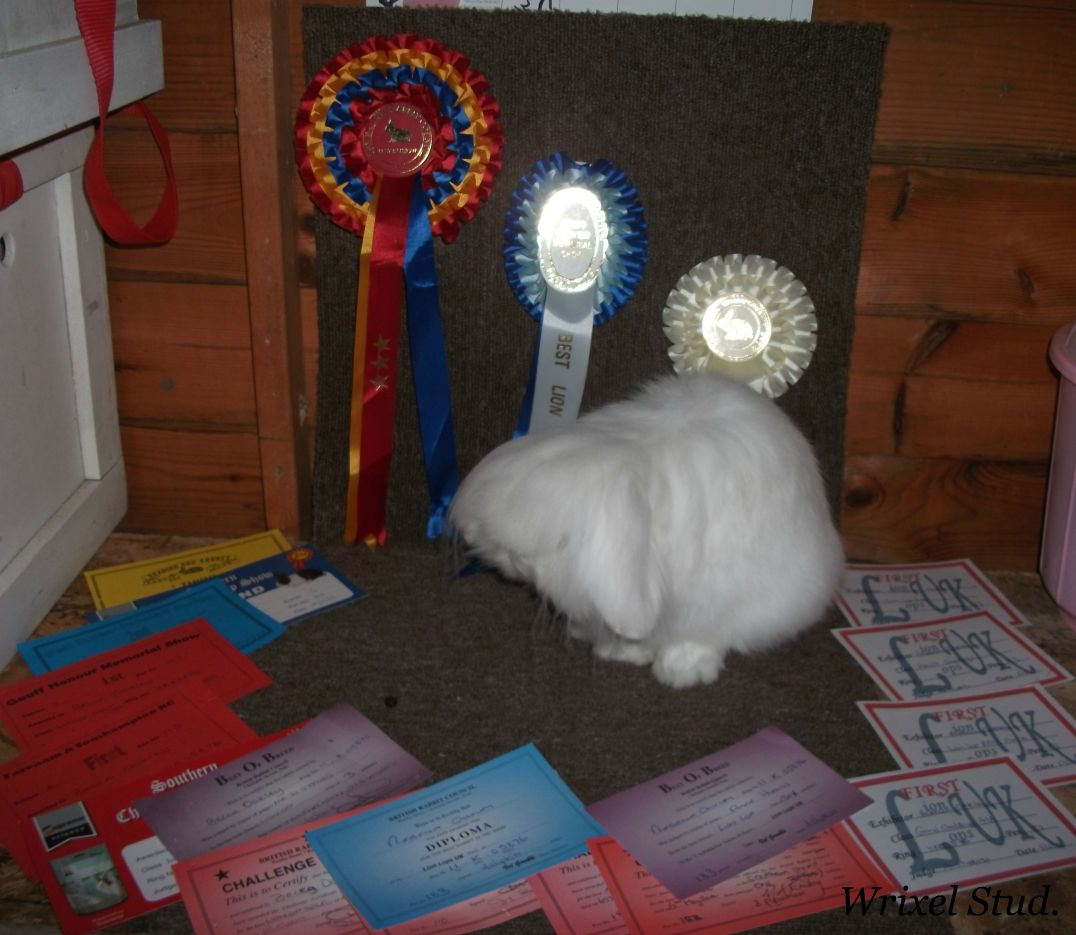
Barrow Bunnies Moon, REW Mini Lion Lop. BiS LLUK Southern Championship Show 2012

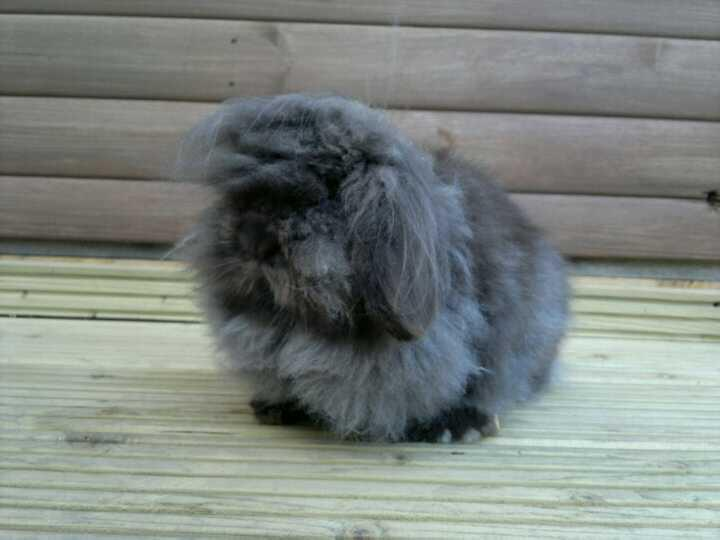
Zashion's Beatrice, dark sable Mini Lion Lop

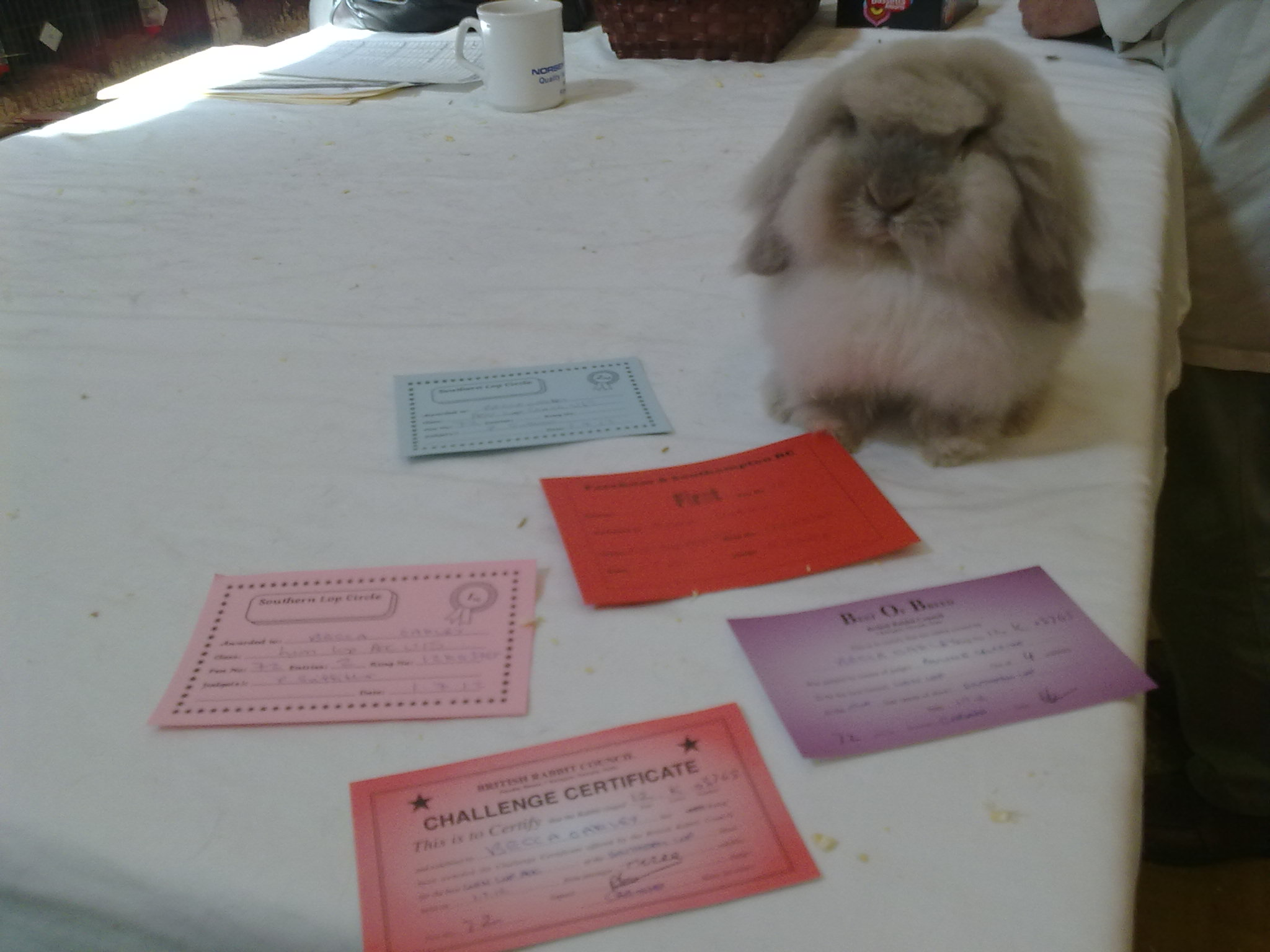
Wrixel Stud's blue-point Mini Lion Lop. With BoB certificate

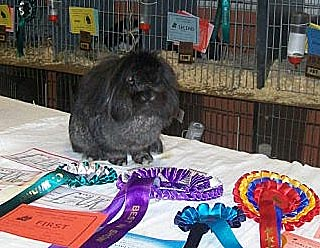
Steel Mini Lion Lop, bred by J. Bramley. BiS Adult Stock Show @ All Lop Show 2009

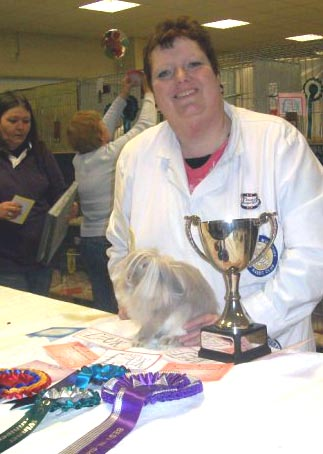
Fawn Mini Lion Lop, bred by S. Grainger. BiS Young Stock Show @ All Lop Show 2009

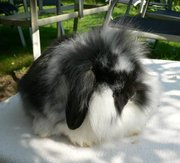
Zashion's Flower, black butterfly Mini Lion Lop. Bred by Zashion Stud

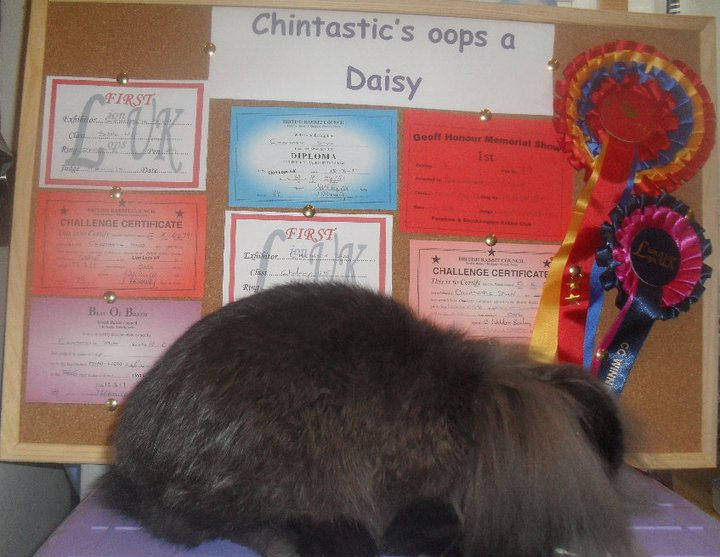
Chintastic's Oops a Daisy, sable Mini Lion Lop.

== Lion Lops UK (LLUK) ==
LLUK is a national club devoted to the furthering of the breed. It was established in 2007, founded and chaired by Jane Bramley, the fancier who first pioneered the breed. LLUK provides stock shows around the country to benefit the keen exhibitors of the Mini Lion Lop breed.

== See also ==
- List of rabbit breeds
- Lop rabbit
