= Cashmere Lop =

Breed of rabbit

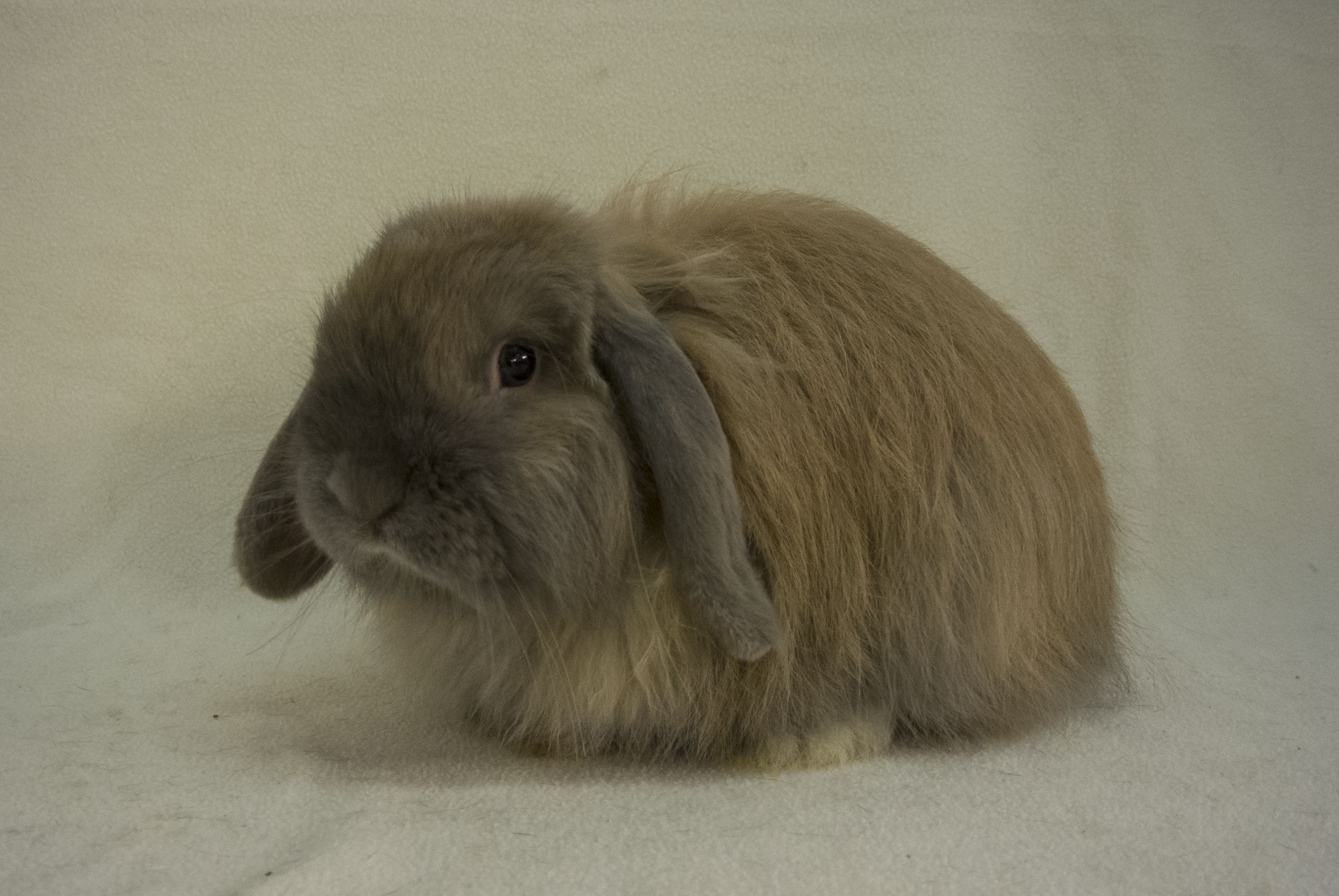
A beige colored Cashmere Lop rabbit

The Cashmere Lop rabbit is a medium-sized rabbit with long dense fur. There is also a Miniature Cashmere Lop. The Cashmere lop was recognised as being different from the Dwarf Lop by the British Rabbit Council in the 1980s. This breed, which originated in England, comes in many different colors and weighs approximately 4-5 lbs.

== See also ==
- List of rabbit breeds
- Lop rabbit
