= Meissner Lop =

Breed of rabbit

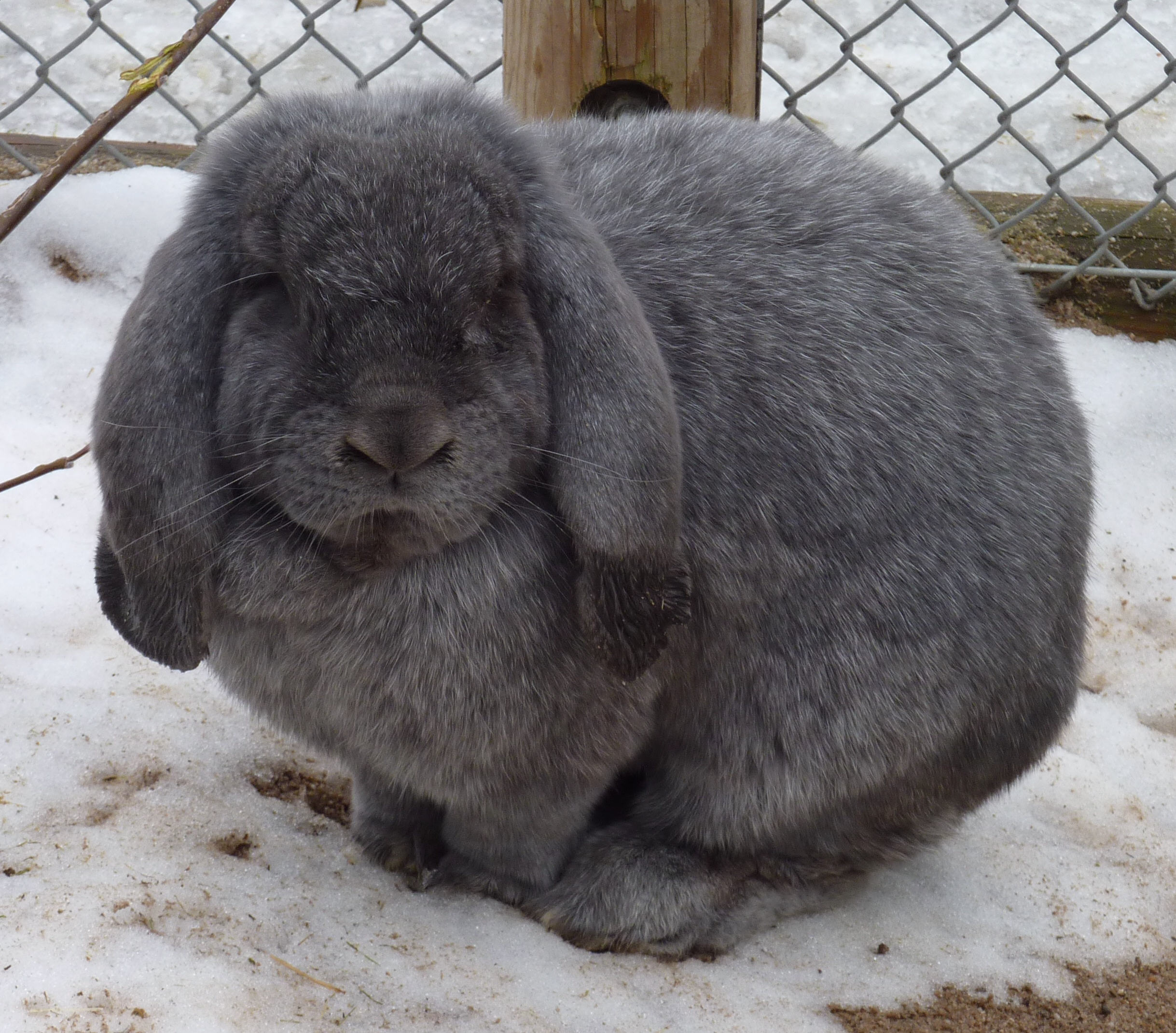
Meissner Lop

The Meissner Lop is a breed of domestic rabbit recognised by the British Rabbit Council (BRC). It is similar to, but more slender than, the French Lop. The BRC currently designates the Meissner Lop as a member of its "Rare Varieties Club".

== See also ==
- List of rabbit breeds
- Lop rabbit
