= Lõpe =

Lõpe may refer to several places in Estonia:

- Lõpe, Hiiu County, village in Hiiumaa Parish, Hiiu County
- Lõpe, Ida-Viru County, village in Alutaguse Parish, Ida-Viru County
- Lõpe, Jõgeva County, village in Jõgeva Parish, Jõgeva County
- Lõpe, Pärnu County, village in Lääneranna Parish, Pärnu County

== See also ==
- Lope (disambiguation)
