= Holland Lop =

Breed of rabbit

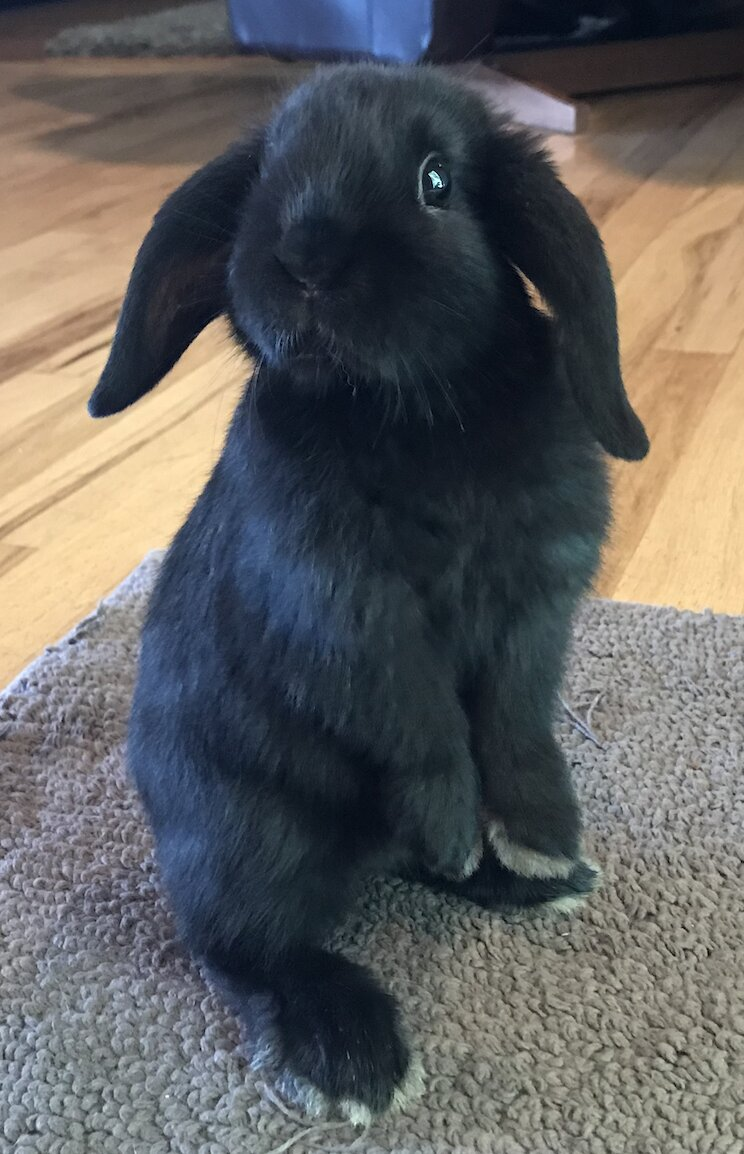
- Holland lop standing on her back feet
- Breed: Holland Lop
- Weight: 2–4 lb (0.91–1.81 kg; 2.0 lb – 4.0 lb)
- Appearance: Various fur colors and big droopy ears

The Holland Lop is a breed of lop-eared rabbit that was recognized by the American Rabbit Breeders Association (ARBA) in 1979. The Holland Lop, with a maximum weight of 1.8 kg (4 lb) (as stipulated by ARBA), is one of the smallest lop-eared breeds.

Holland Lops are one of the most popular rabbit breeds in the United States and the United Kingdom. They were first bred by Dutch breeder Adrian de Cock, as a hybrid of the French Lop and the Netherland Dwarf. Holland Lops are miniature rabbits that only weigh about 1–2 kg (2–4 lb). They are muscular in relation to their compact frame, and have a wide variety of coat colours. Their lopped ears are one of their most distinctive features.

== History ==
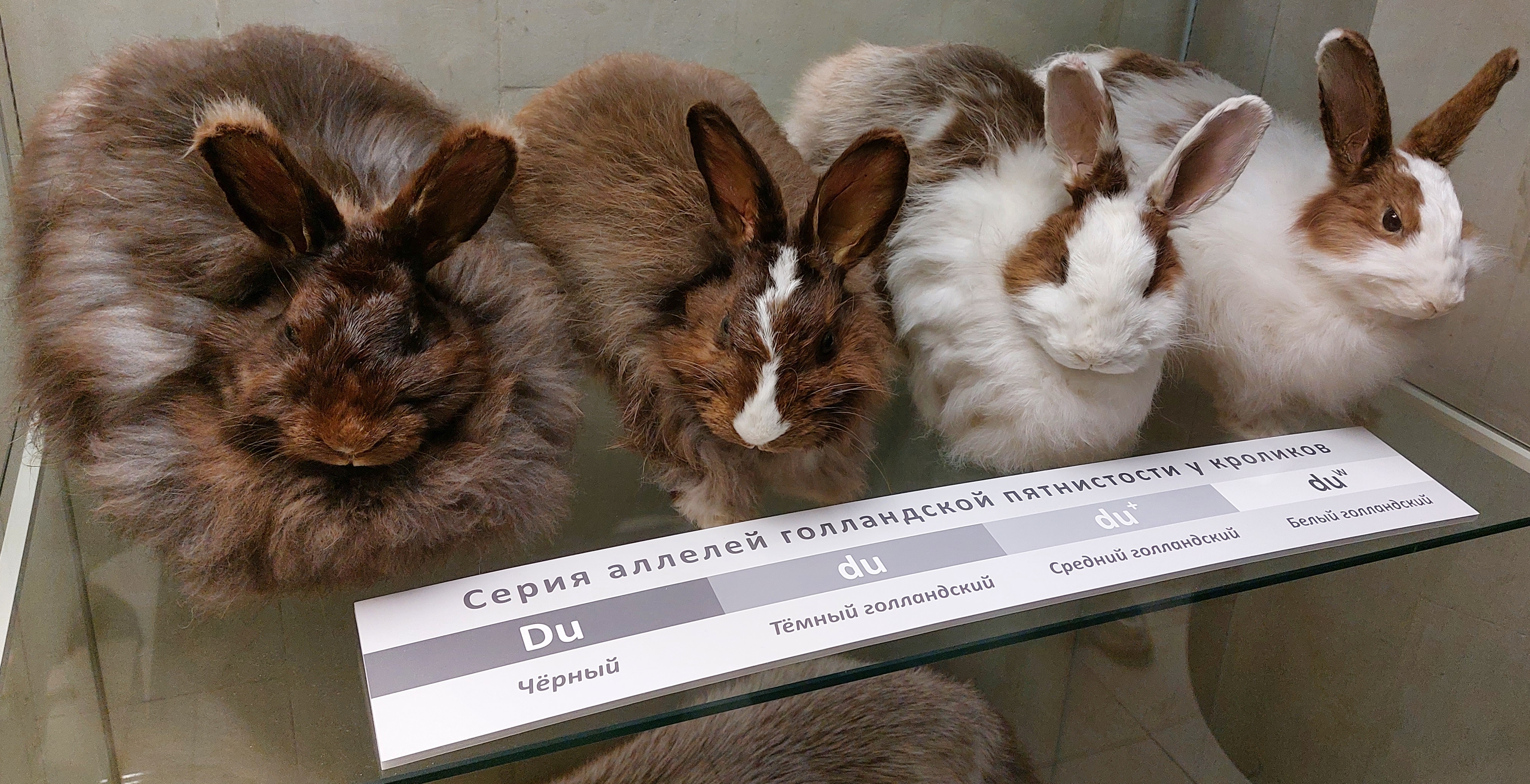
Allele series for Dutch spotting in rabbits. From left to right: Du (black), du (dark Dutch), du^{+} (Medium Dutch), du^{W} (White Dutch).

The history of Holland Lops began with Dutch breeder Adrian de Cock from Tilburg, Netherlands. Holland Lops were acknowledged by the American Rabbit Breed Association (ARBA) in 1979 and made known to the public in 1980.

When Adrian de Cock realized that French Lops were over-sized and Netherland Dwarfs were under-sized in 1949, he decided to breed the two with each other in hopes that their offspring will inherit the optimal size. French Lops weigh 4.5–6.8 kg (10–15 lb) while Netherland Dwarfs only weigh around 0.5–1.1 kg (1.1–2.5 lb). Unfortunately, the results were nothing like what de Cock expected. Their offspring were way too big and died as a result. The mother (female Netherland Dwarf) also died from the breeding process. In 1951, de Cock decided to try the breeding process again. Instead of using a Netherlands Dwarf doe, he used a male Netherland Dwarf buck. He did not think that this was possible at first, because the French Lop was much bigger than the Netherland Dwarf buck. The results exceeded de Cock's expectations. All of the offspring were normal-sized and had standard ear positions. In 1952, de Cock wanted the rabbits' ears to be lopped (hanging limply), so he let a French Lop's and a Netherland Dwarf buck's off-spring breed with the Sooty Fawn, an English Lop with visibly lopped ears. The results were one with lopped ears, 2 with normal ears, and one with semi-lopped ears. At the end of the breeding process in 1955, a Holland Lop weighing less than 3.0 kg (6.6 lb) was born. 11 years after this significant event, de Cock announced Holland Lops weighing less than 2.0 kg (4.4 lb). Another goal at the time was to publicize Holland Lops. In 1964, these rabbits were finally recognized by Dutch breeders and authorities, which led to the introduction of Holland Lops across many countries in Europe.

Sometime in 1965-1975, these rabbits made their first appearance in the United Kingdom thanks to George Scott, an English rabbit breeder from Yorkshire county who found these Holland Lops. At this time, the average weight of this breed was only about 1.5 kg (3.3 lb). The history of the well-known Mini Lop is also related to the history of the Holland Lop. When Scott found these Holland Lops, he sought to make them even smaller, so he let the lightest Holland Lop off-springs breed with each other. The result of this breeding process was the Mini Lop, which was acknowledged by the British Rabbit Council in 1994. In 1976, Holland Lops made their way to the United States, where they were acknowledged by the American Rabbit Breeders Association 3 years later. Over the years, Holland Lops have traveled across the globe and their breeders' accepted maximum weight has changed insignificantly with the actual weight of these rabbits. Holland Lops are now one of the most well-known rabbit breeds in the United States and the United Kingdom.

== Appearance ==
=== Fur ===
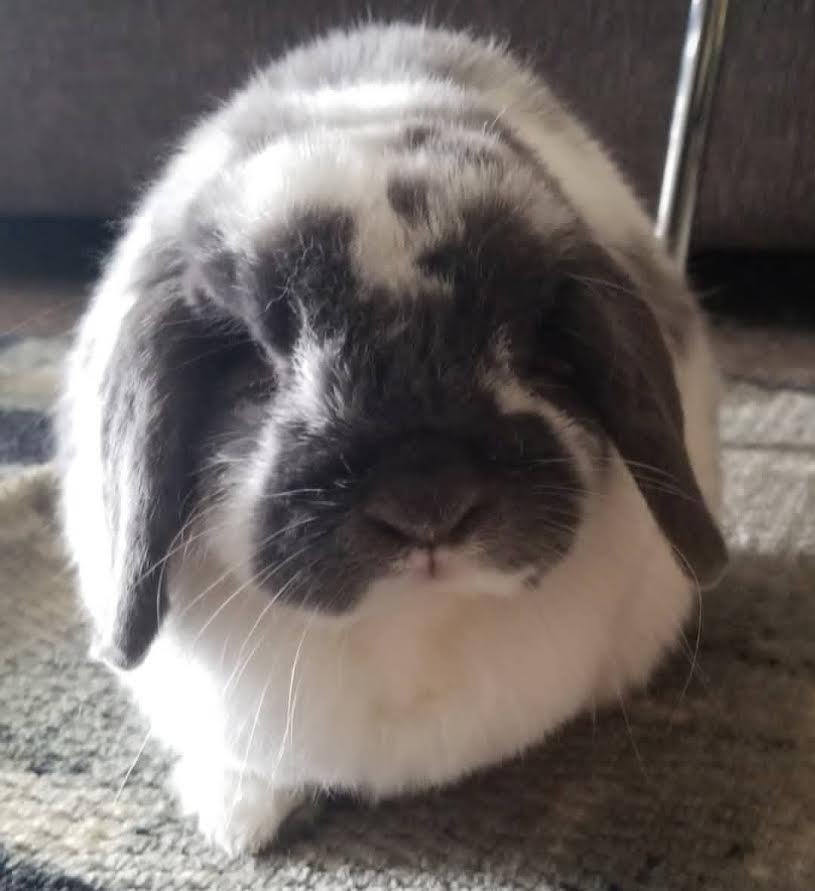
A Holland Lop of the broken blue color variety

Similar to most rabbits, Holland Lops' fur is very diverse with a wide variety of colors and combinations. The different colors include Chocolate, Lilac, Blue, Black, Chestnut, and Frosty. Some examples of fur patterns include broken color (a pattern of patches of color on a white base fur), tortoise, solid, and tri-colored. Almost any normal color can come in a broken variant. When they are shown, it is in broken and solid groups according to the ARBA standard of perfection. Albino Holland Lops with white fur and red eyes are not unheard of. A mutation, very rare among Holland Lops, produces a dark orange color known as ASIP or Agouti Signaling Protein. This color is distinct from the normal light orange color.

=== Head ===
The ears are one of Holland Lops' most distinct features, inheriting their lopped ears from the French Lop and Sooty Fawns. These almond-shaped ears are about 12 cm (4.7 in).

Their eye color is usually black, but can be brown, blue or other colors.

=== Tail ===
Holland Lops' tails are fluffy and small.

=== Feet ===
The feet of the Holland Lop can be categorized into 6 types: ideal, narrow hindquarters, pinched hindquarters, thin bone, thin long bone, and pinched. Since Holland Lops are very small, their legs are also short and stubby. They also have claws that are not used very often.

Ideal Holland Lop feet are parallel and symmetrical. This foot type indicates that the rabbit will have heavy compact bone, and mass. Narrow hindquarters feet are closer, but still parallel. This indicates less width towards the back, but they still maintain a heavy bone and compact type. Pinched hindquarters heels point towards each other, causing the feet to create a V-shape. This may cause the feet to appear at the bottom when posing for a show. Thin boned feet are shorter and thinner than other structures. This indicates that the rabbit will have medium bone and will remain compact, however will have less mass. Thin, long boned foot structure can cause a change throughout other areas of the rabbit's body, making the head pointier, and the ears longer and thinner. In addition, the feet are longer than thin boned feet, and increase the overall size of the rabbit. Pinched and narrow hindquarters is a combination of the pinched hindquarters and narrow hindquarters foot structures. The heels point towards each other and are closer together, which leads to the hindquarters to appear more hollow.

=== Ideal appearance ===
According to the Holland Lop show standards, they are expected to be muscular for their short size. "Broad shoulders and deep hindquarters" are expected traits from a high quality Holland Lop, according to a judge from the Holland Lop Specialty Club. They also added that the legs should be "thick, short, and heavily boned." In shows, the body is worth a total of 32 points.

The Holland Lop's flesh is known to be muscular and well-toned. This is especially true when applied to high ranking show Holland Lops. They have "short, rounded noses," which differentiates them from other lop breeds, such as the mini lop. Holland Lops usually weigh 1–2 kg (2–4 lb). However, according to ARBA show standards, the Holland Lop at maximum weight is 1.8 kg (4 lb).

== Behavior ==
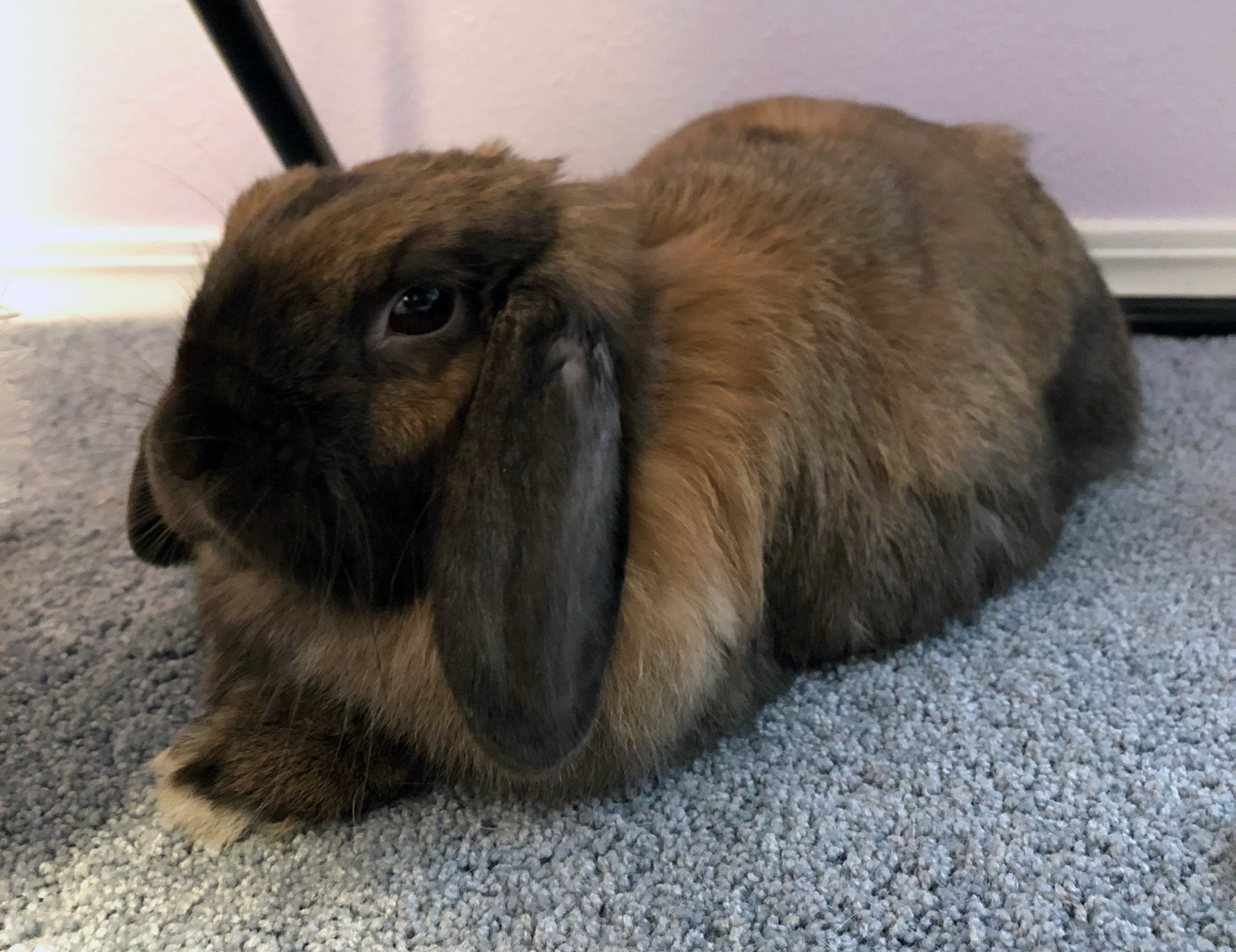
A Holland Lop resting

Holland Lops as a breed are considered to be very calm rabbits even though they tend to come off as shy at first. As a result of this, owners can expect to spend time playing and relaxing with their Lops. In addition to exercise, Holland Lops also require toys to chew on. This is not only important for keeping them occupied, but also for avoiding destructive behaviour to other objects or property.

As a whole, the Holland Lop is considered to be a very friendly breed. Male rabbits (bucks) have been reported to be less nippy than female rabbits (does), although they do tend to experience a stage where they are shyer and nippy. This typically occurs when they would like to be bred. However, does are often much neater than bucks. Bucks have been known to exhibit destructive behavior, often resulting in ruined cages.

== Health ==
A study in the UK found that lop eared rabbits – such as the Holland Lop – had worse dental health than other breed types. The study found lop-eared rabbits to have a 23 times greater risk of incisor pathology (underbite, overbite, overgrown or fractured incisors), a 12 times greater risk of molar overgrowth, a 13 times greater risk of molar sharpness, and a significant greater risk of molar spurs compared to erect-eared rabbits.

== See also ==
- House rabbit
- List of rabbit breeds
- Lop rabbit

== Works cited ==
- “The History of the Mini Lop Rabbit and the True UK Mini Lop Standard.” Mini Lops Scotland, Mini Lop history article
- “Holland Lop Rabbit Facts, Size, Lifespan and Care.” Caring for Pets, 14 Feb. 2019, Article on how to care for your rabbit.
- Dickson, David. “Holland Lop Rabbit Who Loves to Chew (and Chew Some More).” Best Friends Animal Society, 29 Nov. 2017, Article on Holland Lop's teeth
- Fletcher, Ann (2013). "Holland Lop Rabbits The Complete Owner's Guide to Holland Lop Bunnies How to Care for your Holland Lop Pet, including Breeding, Lifespan, Colors, Health, Personality, Diet and Facts", p. 68. Evolution Knowledge Limited. ISBN 9781909820043
- Phil Batey, "History of the Holland Lop", dnarabbitry, Article on the history of Holland Lops
- “Holland Lop Appearance.” hollandloprabbits, 1 Jan. 1970, Blog post on the appearance of Holland Lops
- “Four Steps to Healthy Teeth.” Petplan, Article on how to take care of rabbit teeth
- “Holland Lop - Breed Information and Advice.” Petplan, Article on the general information about Holland Lops
- “Holland Lop Rabbit Breed.” Lafeber Co. - Small Mammals, 14 Feb. 2019, Article on the general information about Holland Lops
- “Holland Lop Rabbit Health, Temperament, Coat, Health and Care.” PetGuide, 31 Jan. 2019, Article on health and behaviors of Holland Lops
- “Holland Lop Type.” Holly's Hollands Rabbitry, Blog post regarding Holland Lops' appearance
- “Introduction to Holland Lops.” Sand N Pines, Article on general information about Holland Lops
- “Judging the Holland Lop.” Lots of Lops Rabbitry, Article on how to judge a Holland Lop
- Tamsin. “Rabbit Hutch/Cage Size Guide.” The Rabbit House, 10 June 2014, Article on how to find the right Holland Lop cage size
- Shapiro, Amy. "'Lops Are Mellow and Other Dangerous Myths'", House Rabbit Society, Article on myths about Holland Lops.
- Stroupe, Laura. “Judging Lop Rabbits:Evaluating Ears and Crowns Holland, Mini, and Fuzzy Lops.” Show Rabbit Information, Article on how to judge Holland Lops
- “The Ideal Diet for Rabbits.” PDSA, Article on the ideal diet for rabbits
- Howard, Anthony. “Welcome to the HLRSC.” Hlrsc, Article on the history of Holland Lops
- “What Is a Holland Lop? | How to Care, Lifespan, FAQ (With Pictures).” RabbitPedia, Article on how to care for Holland Lops
