= LOP =

LOP may refer to:

- Landscape of practice in social science
- Language oriented programming
- Legion of Pain, a professional wrestling tag team
- C2.LOP, Windows malware
- Line of position in geometry and navigation
- Local operational picture
- Lombok International Airport (IATA code)
- Long Ping station (Hong Kong MTR station code)
- Lipid oxidation product

== See also ==
- Lop (disambiguation)
