= Mini Rex =

Breed of rabbit

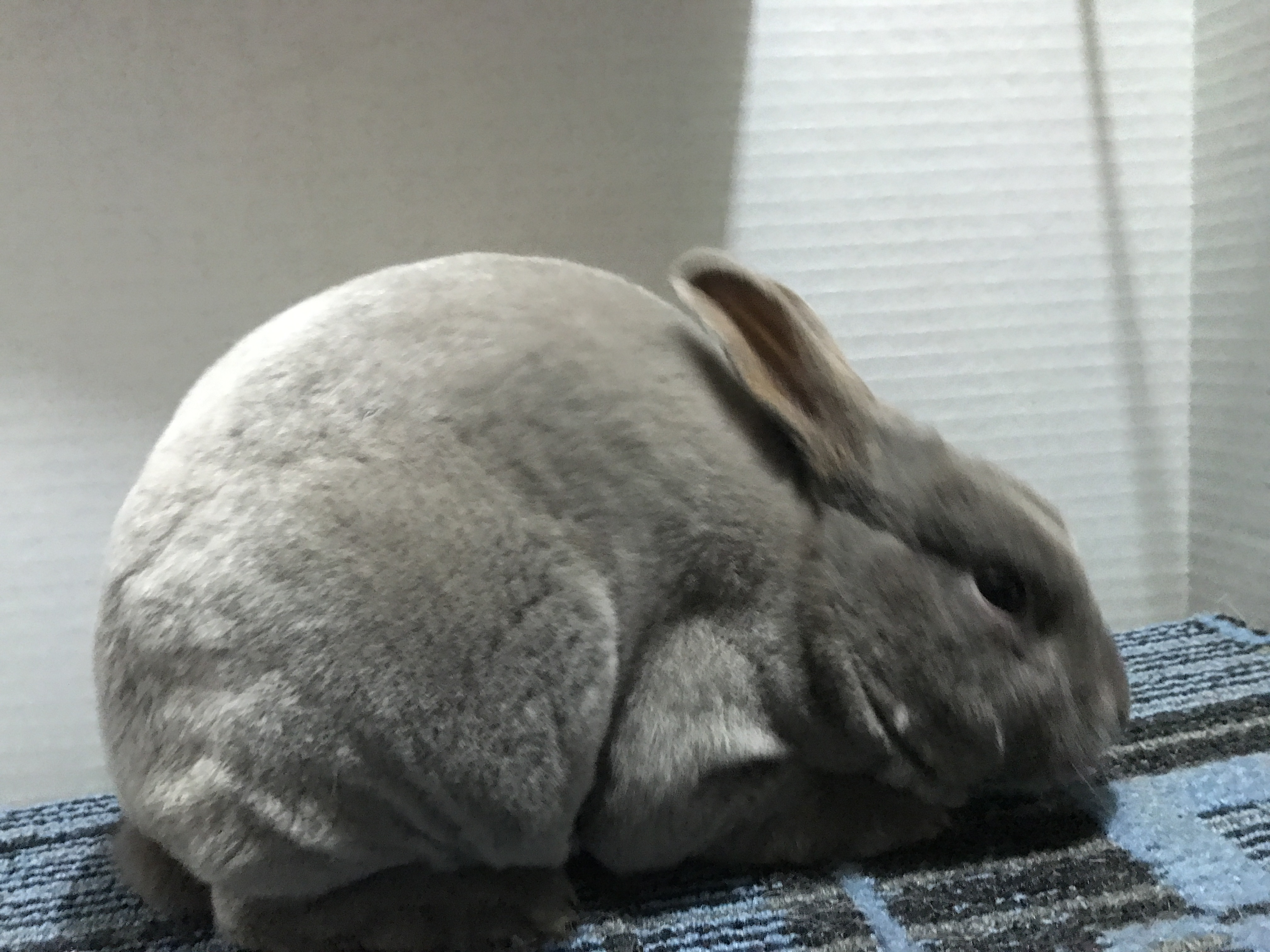
The Best Opposite Sex Variety lilac Mini Rex at the 2017 ARBA national convention in Indianapolis. Taken by Christa Deines

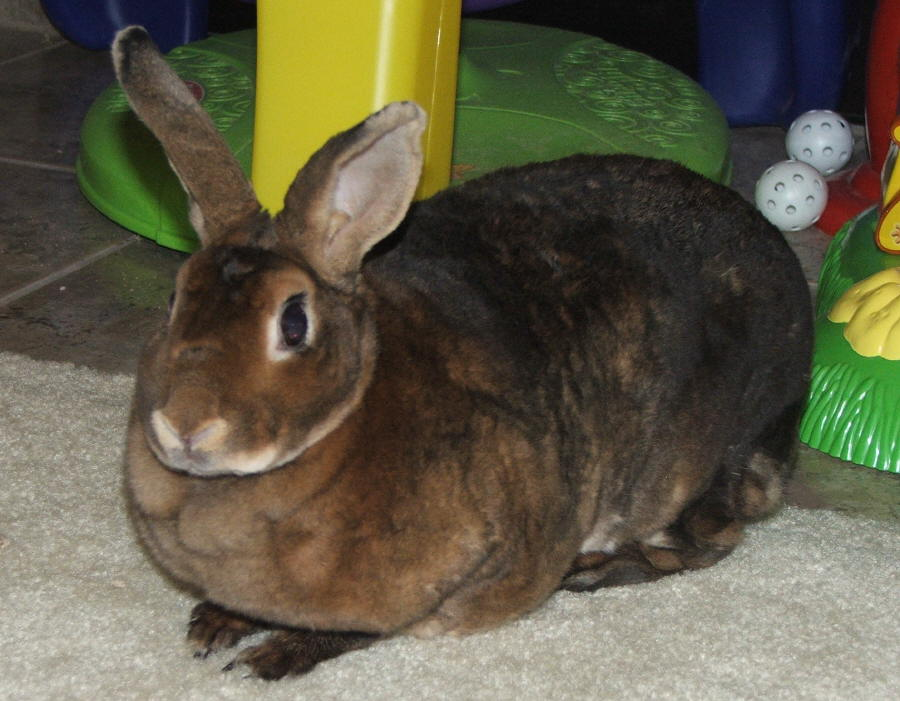
A Mini Rex doe in the castor coloration.

Mini Rex is a breed of domestic rabbit that was created in 1984 in Florida by the late Monna Berryhill of Texas. The Rex mutation, derived in France in the 19th century, is recessive and causes the hair to protrude outwards from the body, instead of lying flat, and the guard hairs to be shortened to the length of the undercoat, or a bit longer.

The small size, plush coat and friendly personalities of Mini Rex rabbits make them one of the most popular rabbit breeds in the United States. They were first recognized by the American Rabbit Breeders Association (ARBA) in 1988, and have been very popular with exhibitors ever since. They are also recognized by the British Rabbit Council (BRC). They weigh from 3 to 4.5 pounds when fully grown. They are small and rather close coupled. The ideal length of fur is 5/8 inch, and the fur has a lustrous appearance, good body, and a plush-like effect which offers a distinct springy resistance to the touch.

== The Mini Rex Standard ==
For competitions, a Mini Rex should have a well-rounded back, with well-developed and filled shoulders, midsection and hindquarters. The head should be well-filled and set on a short neck, with thick ears measuring no more than 3.5 inches. They should have medium-fine bone and rather short legs. Fur should be extremely dense, straight, and upright. It should be smooth and springy, not too soft or silky. Fur must be between 1/2 inch and 7/8 inch long. Any missing toe nails can lead to disqualification of the rabbit.

The Mini Rex is judged 45 points on general type, of that, 35 for body, 5 for head, and 5 for ears, in addition, there are 35 points for fur, 15 for color and 5 for condition, making a total of 100 possible points. They are four-class rabbits, which means there are two age groups for each sex they can be shown in. There are Senior Bucks (3 – 4.25lbs, ideal 4lbs over the age of 6 months), Senior Does (3.25 – 4.5lbs, ideal 4.25lbs over the age of 6 months), Junior Bucks (2 – 3.75lbs under 6 months) and Junior Does (2 – 3.75lbs under 6 months). Juniors exceeding maximum weight limits may be shown in higher age classifications. No animal may be shown in a lower age classification than its true age.

Many Mini Rex rabbit shows are either local or national. Some shows are not sponsored by the American Rabbit Breeders Association (ARBA), but rather by local or state Breeders Associations. Some Mini Rex shows are sanctioned by local show "designators" who set up and organize the event. Rabbits are judged by national judges and the winners are announced at the end of judging. Rabbit shows are divided by class (color, age, and gender) and announced three times; If there are not enough show entries on the table or not enough show up, the class can be canceled. Rabbits can win a "leg" at sanctioned shows, that are noted as a winning, these can be won by having 5 rabbits or more in a class with 3 or more exhibitors. The "legs" can be classified by BIS (best in show) BOB (best of breed) BOS (best opposite sex) BOV (best of variety) BOSV (best opposite sex of variety)

== Coloration and Markings ==
Accepted colors for the Mini Rex include those listed below. In 2012, Smoke Pearl was accepted as the 19th variety of Mini Rex. In 2017, the ARBA Standards Committee accepted the Sable Mini Rex as a new breed variety. New certificates of development have been awarded by ARBA for the tan Mini Rex, both to be presented in the next few years.

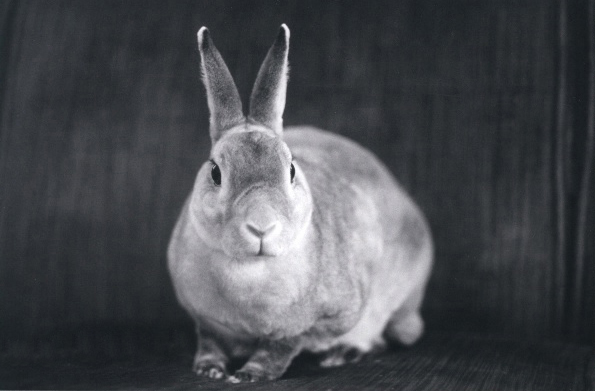
A Chinchilla Mini Rex

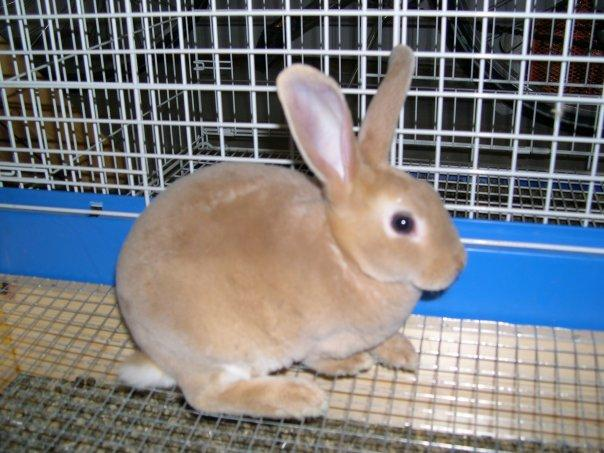
A male Fawn Mini Rex

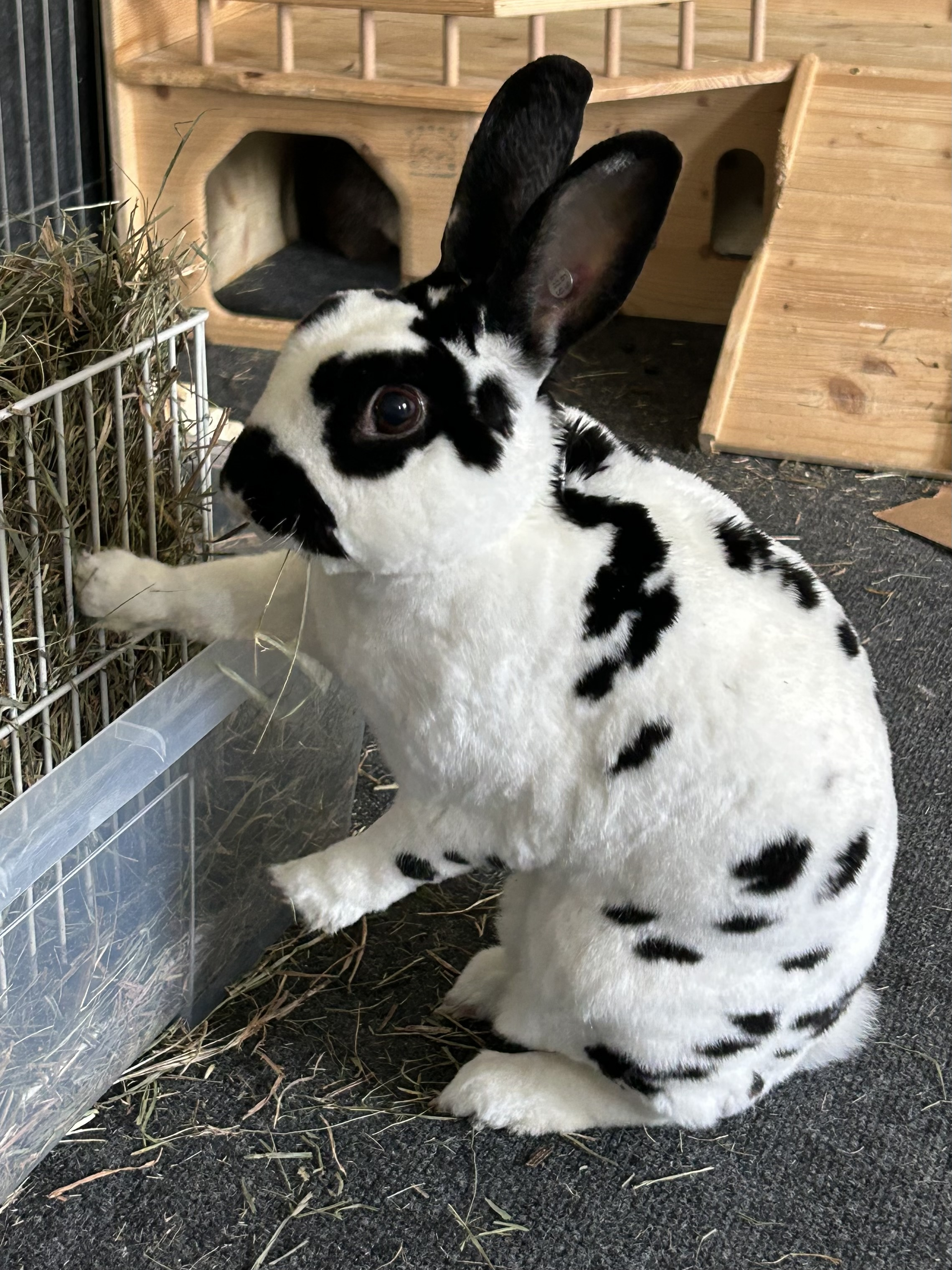
A Dalmatian-pattern Mini Rex

- Black – Dark, rich, lustrous black, running deeply towards the skin, blending into a dark blue under-color. Eyes are dark brown.
- Blue – Dark blue, running as deeply towards the skin as possible, with a medium blue under-color. Eyes are a bluish grey.
- Castor – A rich chestnut color tipped with black. The under-color is slate blue or white with an orange intermediate band of color. Ears are laced in black. Surface color of the belly is cream, as well as the eye circles and jowls. Eyes are either brown, or black tinted with blue.
- Chinchilla – Sparkling mix of pearl and black, resembling a true chinchilla. Slate blue under hair, white belly color. Ears are laced with black, and eye circles are pearl. Upper of tail is black; bottom of tail is white. Eyes are either brown, or bluish grey.
- Chocolate – Lustrous chocolate brown. Dove-grey under-color. Brown eyes.
- Himalayan – Body is bright white. Ears, feet, tail, and nose dark blue or black. Dark toenails; pink eyes.
- Lilac – Dove grey lightly tinted with a lilac shade. Matching toenails and bluish grey eyes.
- Lynx – Light fawn color tipped with lilac. White under-color. Eye circles, jowls, belly, inside of ears, and underside of tail are white. Stomach must have a lilac undercolor. It is not permit to bleed onto the upper sides of the animal. Eyes are bluish grey.
- Silver Marten - Accepted colors are black, blue, chocolate or lilac, with white/silver under belly, chin, tail, on head behind ears, and circular eye markings.
- Opal – Medium blue top color, fawn intermediate color and grayish blue under-color. Underside of tail, jowls, belly, inside of ears, and eye circles are to be white or cream. Eyes are bluish grey.
- Otter – Accepted colors black, blue, chocolate, or lilac. Must have cream color around eyes and on stomachs with appropriate undercolor. (IE: Black Otters have a cream stomach with slate undercolor.) Must have rufus markings lacing ears, behind neck, on inner thighs, and outlining the stomach.
- Red – Rich red with as little shading as possible. White or cream belly color. Eyes are brown.
- Sable – Rich sepia brown coloring that fades to a lighter sepia on the sides, chest, belly, inside of legs, and underside of the tail. Eyes are brown
- Sable Point – Lighter brown all over and darker ears, nose, tail, and feet. Eyes are brown.
- Seal – Dark, dark brown body, fading to lighter brown on the belly and chest. Eyes are brown.
- Smoke Pearl -- Medium pearl gray body with darker pearl/smokey gray shading on the nose, around the eyes, on the ears, feet and tail. The eyes should be blue gray.
- Tortoise – Rich orange with dark shading on the belly, feet, rear, sides, face, and ears. Eyes are brown.
- White – Pure white. Eyes are pink/reddish tint.
- Blue-Eyed White – Pure white. Eyes are blue.
- Broken – Any accepted color in conjunction with white.
- Tri-Color(Harlequin) – White with either: Black & Orange, Lilac & Fawn, Chocolate & Orange, or Blue & Fawn.
- Pattern – A Broken with a balanced nose marking, eye markings, colored ears, colored tail, and colored body spots. Colored area covering 10% to 50% of the rabbit.

Note: Tri-color is to be shown as a Harlequin or broken

== See also ==
- List of rabbit breeds
- Rex rabbit
