= Lope =

Lope is an old given name of Basque, Gascon and Spanish origin, derived from Latin lupus, meaning "wolf". Lope may refer to:

== People ==
- Lope de Isásaga (1493–1515), Basque Spanish conquistador
- Lope de Aguirre (1510s – 1561), Basque Spanish conquistador
- Lope de Vega (1562–1635), Spanish poet
- Lope Martín, Spanish sailor
- Lope Recio Loynaz (1860–1927), Cuban general
- Lupo II of Gascony (died 778)

== Other ==
- Lope (film), a 2010 film
- Lope de Vega (horse), an Irish bred Thoroughbred racehorse
- Lope language, a Loloish language of China
- Lopé (department), Gabon
- Lope, a type of canter and gallop in horseback riding

== See also ==
- Lop (disambiguation)
- Lõpe (disambiguation)
- López
- Loping Airfield, a World War II United States Army Air Forces airfield China
- Luoping County, China
- Lupe (disambiguation)
- Ochoa
