= Lop rabbit =

Breed of rabbit

A lop rabbit or lop-eared rabbit is any rabbit with ears that droop, as opposed to being carried erect. A number of rabbit breeds (listed below) are characterized by such lop ears. Abnormalities in the skull of a half-lop rabbit were studied by Charles Darwin in 1868.

== Ear carriage ==
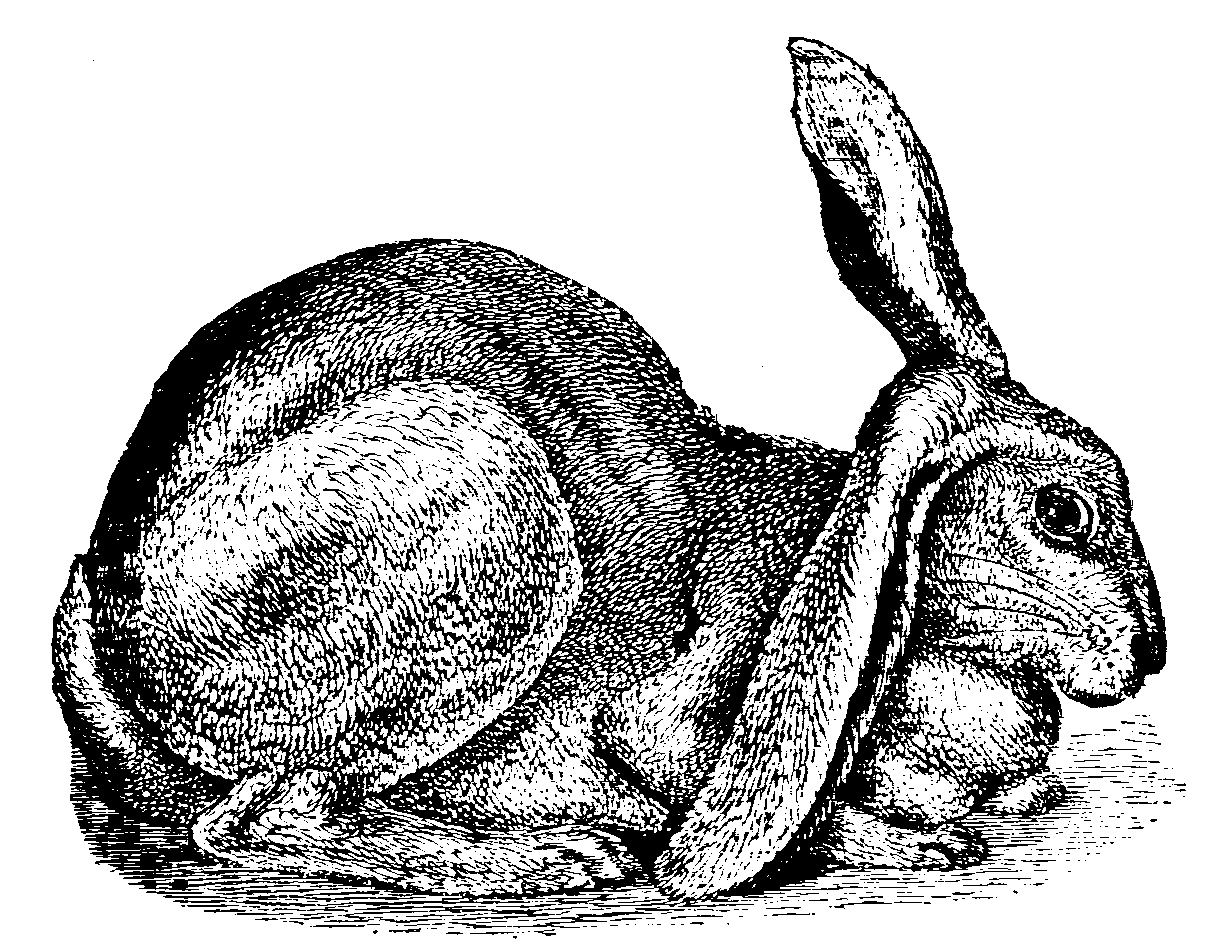
Half-Lop Rabbit. Illustration by Charles Darwin, 1868.

The defining feature of the lop rabbit is its ear carriage. Unlike the erect ear of the majority of domestic rabbit breeds, lop breeds have ears loosely drooping, with the opening of the ear facing the skull. Due to the slightly-raised cartilaginous ear base, the head of many lop rabbits (with the exception of English Lops) has a small bulge, referred to as the crown. The head of a typical lop rabbit is said to resemble that of a male sheep in profile, thus the German term for a lop rabbit (Widder, meaning Aries [the ram]), the French term (bélier, meaning ram) and the Italian term (ariete, from Latin aries).

A rabbit's ear, with its blood vessels close to the surface, is an essential thermoregulator. The additional weight of a longer or thicker ear is not always fully supported by the rest of the ear structure, resulting in ears that droop. The ears of some young lop rabbits may not achieve their full adult droop until the ear growth is finished. The ears of a lop rabbit prevent them hearing predators and maintaining a healthy body temperature. Both of these disadvantages keep them from surviving outdoor conditions.

== Ear type ==
Rabbits are known to carry their ears in one of five ways:

- Erect ears (the most common): Both ears are carried upright. Such ears may at times rest atop the rabbit's back, or be temporarily smoothed down by the rabbit when it bathes or grooms itself.
- Full lop ears (less common): Both ears hang fully down, brushing the rabbit's cheeks and shoulders. Such ears may gently undulate as the rabbit hops.
- Half lop ears (uncommon): One ear is carried in a full (or nearly-full) droop, while the other ear is carried erect. Similar in appearance, a now-extinct one-eared rabbit—said to resemble a unicorn—was breeding true around the end of the 18th century, and in 1958 two such healthy specimens were photographed.
- Oar lop ears (uncommon): Both ears are carried roughly horizontal to the ground and out over the rabbit's shoulders. The term comes from the resemblance to a boat's oars at rest. In modern times, these are sometimes referred to as helicopter ears.
- Horn lop ears (rare): Both ears are carried roughly horizontal to the ground and out over the rabbit's nose. The term comes from the resemblance to the forward-facing horns of some cows.
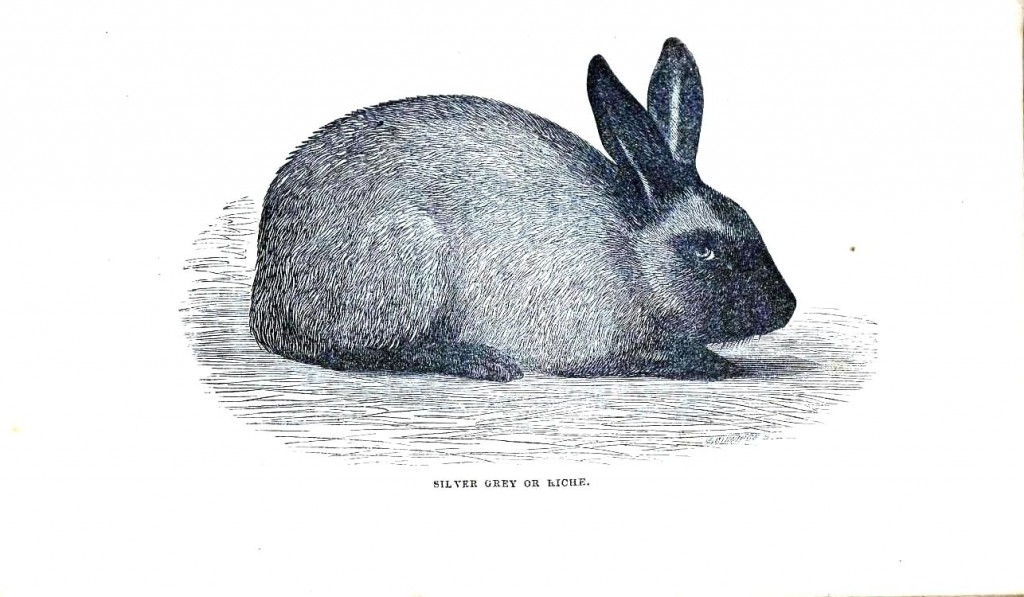
Erect ears.
Illustration by [E. Whimper?], ca. 1862

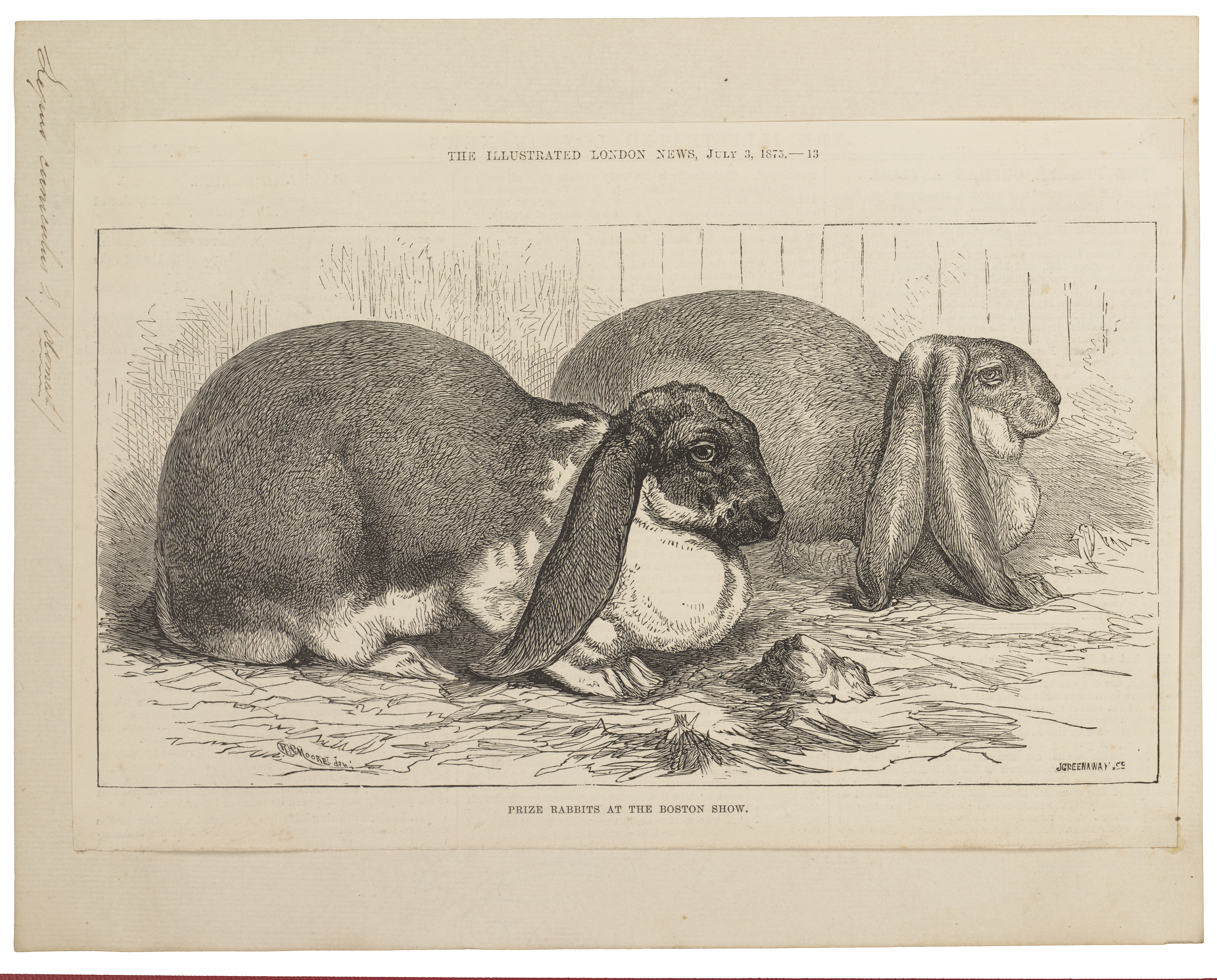
Full lop ears
Unknown artist, 1875

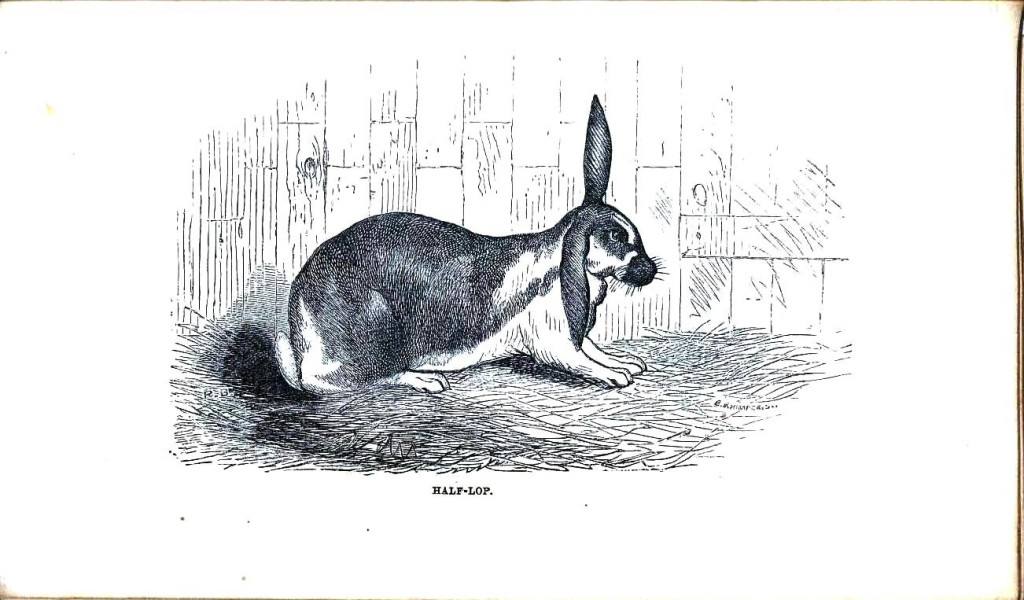
Half lop ears
Illustration by E. Whimper, ca. 1862

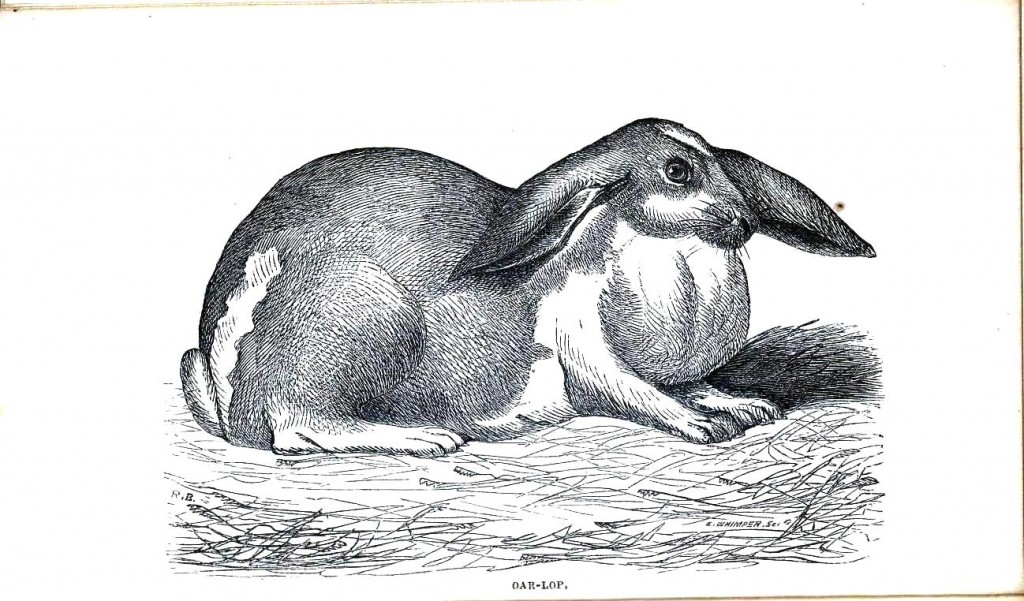
Oar lop ears
Illustration by E. Whimper, ca. 1862

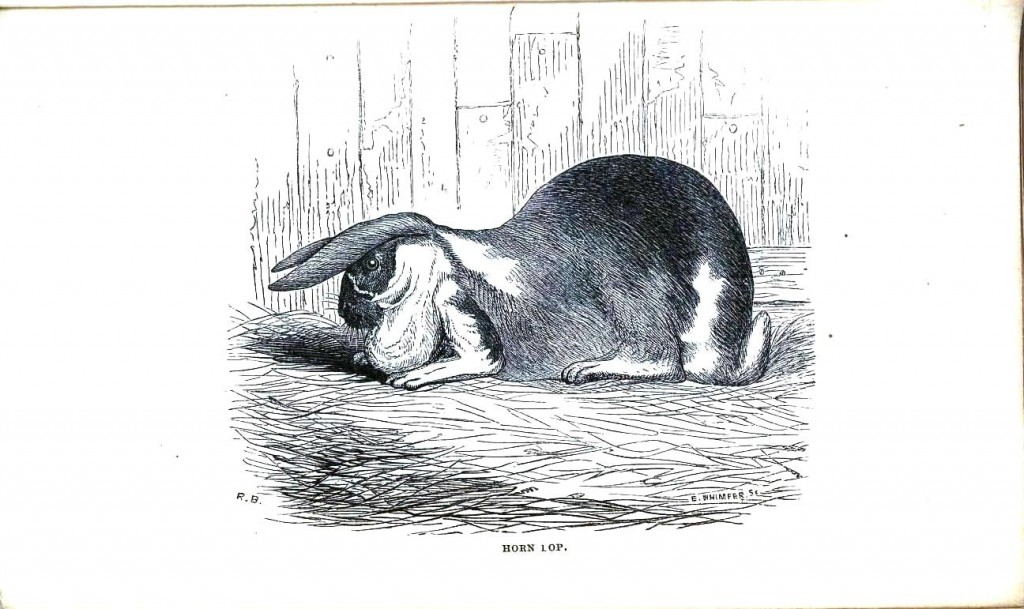
Horn lop ears
Illustration by E. Whimper, ca.1862

== Ear length ==
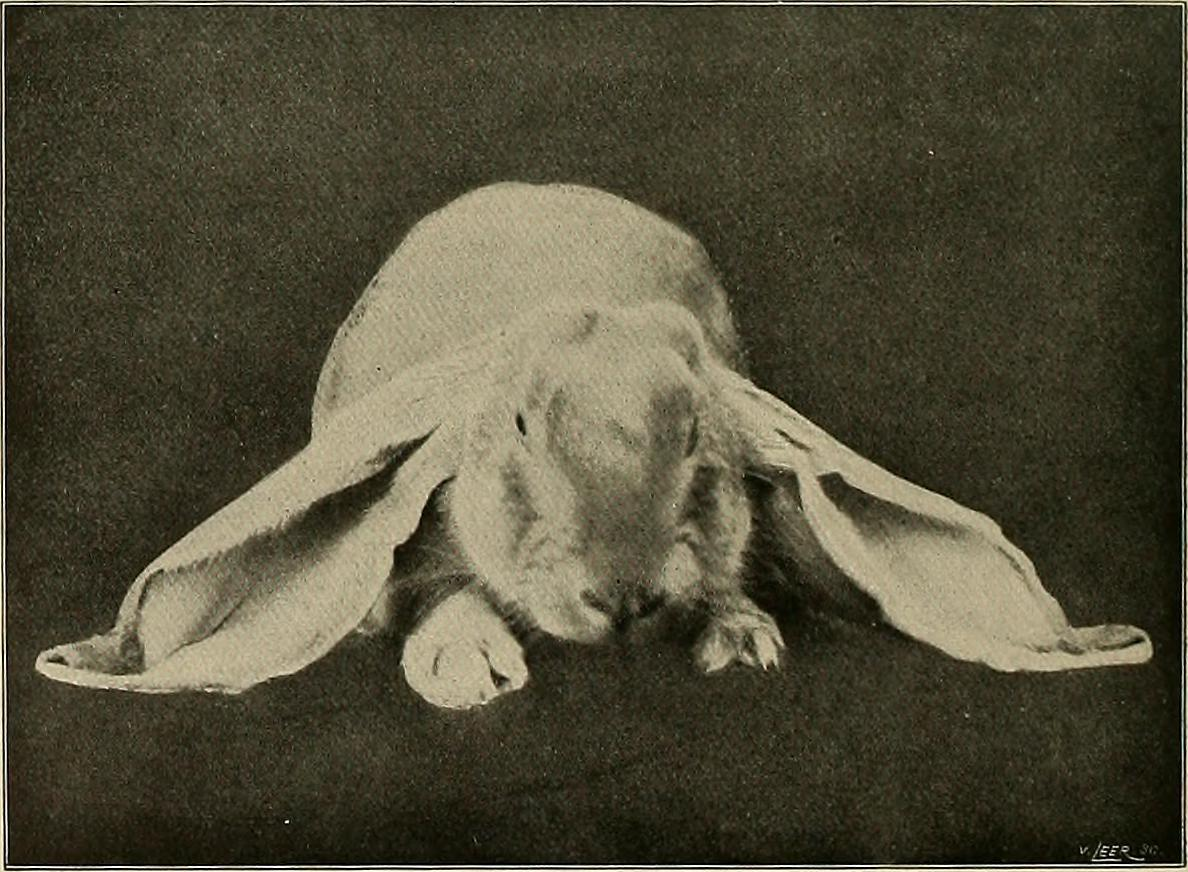
English Lop (1907)

Longer (or thicker) ears are more likely to droop. Some lop-eared rabbits have been deliberately bred for exaggerated ear length. As this can be considered detrimental to the rabbit's health, requirements in Germany "ban rabbits with ears over 65 cm (25.5 in), and in Holland, 70 cm (27.5 in) is as long as they can be allowed [in shows] before disqualification." The Guinness World Records award for "Longest ears on a rabbit" was given in 2003 to an English Lop in the United States with ears measuring 79.058 cm (31.125 in).

== Breeds of lop-eared rabbit ==
Though the majority of rabbit breeds have erect ears, lop-eared breeds make up approximately 15% of all the breeds currently recognized by the American Rabbit Breeders Association (ARBA) or the British Rabbit Council (BRC). Such lop-eared breeds include:

- American Fuzzy Lop
- Cashmere Lop
- Dwarf Lop
- English Lop
- French Lop
- German Lop
- Holland Lop [US]
- Meissner Lop
- Mini Lion Lop
- Mini Lop [US]
- Miniature Cashmere Lop
- Miniature Lop [UK/NL]
- Velveteen Lop

== See also ==
- List of rabbit breeds
