= English Lop =

Breed of rabbit

The English Lop is a fancy breed of domestic rabbit that was developed in England in the 19th century through selective breeding. It is believed to be the first breed of lop rabbit developed by humans, and it may be one of the oldest breeds of domestic rabbit. Averaging 5.5 kg (12 lb), the English Lop is characterised by its distinctively long lop ears, bold head, and large body size.

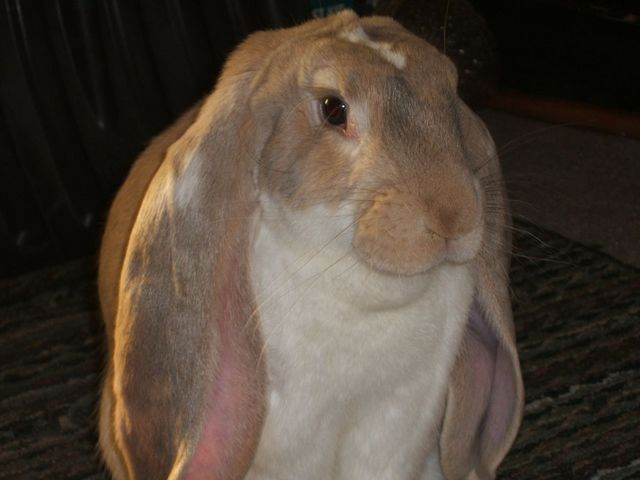
An English Lop rabbit

== History ==
As the first lop breed, the English Lop was developed in England in the 19th century for exhibition as an early "fancy" breed—in response to the rising animal fancy of the time. During the Victorian era, the English Lop emerged as a mainstream household pet, marking a departure for such "fancy" breeds from the earlier role of the domesticated rabbit as a source of meat, fur, and wool production. Later, the English Lop was bred with other rabbit breeds from the continent, giving rise to new lop breeds that include the French Lop (from English Lop / Flemish Giant crosses) and the Holland Lop (from French Lop / Netherland Dwarf crosses).

== Appearance ==
The English Lop, though longer and more slender in body than other lop breeds, has ears up to 79 cm (31.125 in) in length tip to tip—the longest ears of any rabbit breed. The ears of English Lops reach the end of their growth at approximately 5 months of age, although the ears of males can gain as much as an inch as their skull matures.

English Lops are bred in both solids and brokens (colors broken by white) and within this, they can come in several different colours, including (but not limited to) Black, orange/fawn, blue, agouti/opal, chinchilla, Red Eyed White, and blue and black torts. The American Rabbit Breeders Association allows all recognised lop colours to be shown in either Solid or Broken groups other than pointed whites. English lops have a smooth, 'flyback' short coat, and their ears should be properly furred and silky to the touch. In body they should resemble a mandolin cut in half, a wide nose and broad head with no visible crown, long, loose hanging ears, strong shoulders and a rise that results in a round, deep body over the hips and flanks.

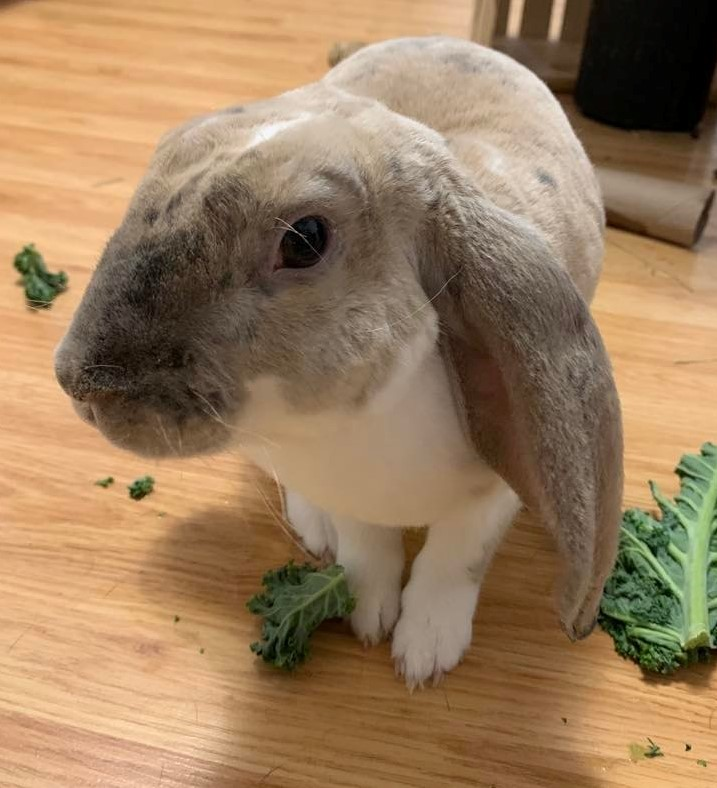
An 8 months old English Lop rabbit

== Breeding ==
The female English Lop rabbit is known to be particularly prolific, with rich milk, and a good maternal sense, and can produce large litters of 5–12, with a gestation period of 28–35 days. On average they give birth at 30–32 days. It is during the first 16 weeks of life that the ears undergo their most rapid growth, doubling in size each week in the first month. At about four weeks old, the ears are longer than the body.

== Records ==
On 1 November 2003 the ears of an English Lop called Nipper's Geronimo were measured at 79 cm (31.125 in) in a complete span at the American Rabbit Breeders Association National Convention in Wichita, Kansas, USA and are recorded as the largest measured ear-span of a rabbit, and a Guinness World Record.

== See also ==
- Domestic rabbit
- List of rabbit breeds
- Lop rabbit
