= Ferdinand Lop =

French politician (1891–1974)

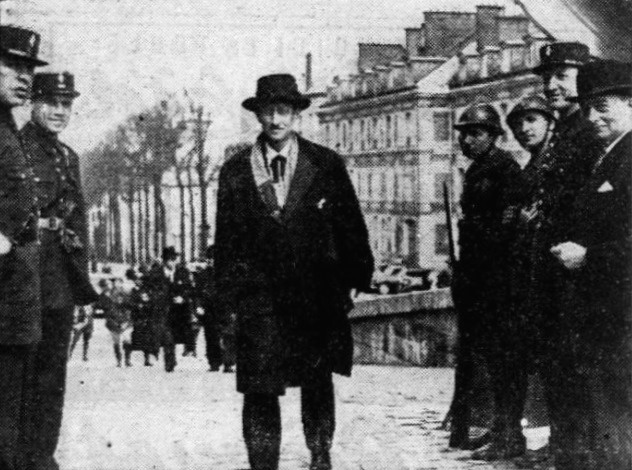
Ferdinand Samuel 1939

Ferdinand Samuel Lop, later Samuel Ferdinand-Lop, known as Ferdinand Lop (10 October 1891 – 29 October 1974) was a French Jewish journalist, draughtsman, English language teacher, writer, poet, and humourist. He stood repeatedly as a satirical candidate for the French Presidency and for the Académie française.

He was born in Marseille. He married Sonia Seligman on 18 January 1923 in Paris.

During the French Fourth Republic, Lop stood on an electoral platform which consisted of:

- the elimination of poverty after 10 pm;
- the construction of a bridge 300 m wide, to shelter vagrants;
- the extension of the roadstead of Brest to Montmartre and of the Boulevard Saint-Michel to the sea (in both directions) – a policy reprised from an earlier satirical candidate, Paul Duconnaud;
- the installation of a slide in the Place de la Sorbonne, for students of the University of Paris [notorious for instigating political unrest];
- the nationalization of brothels, to give prostitutes the benefits of public servant status;
- the reduction of pregnancy from nine to seven months;
- the installation of moving pavements, to make life easier for wanderers;
- providing a pension to the widow of the unknown soldier;
- the relocation of Paris to the countryside, for fresh air;
- the removal of the last coach from Paris métro trains.

He authored numerous booklets, often with evocative titles, such as Thoughts and aphorisms (1951), Pétain and history: What I would have said in my inaugural speech at the Académie française if I had been elected (1957), History of the Latin Quarter (1960–1963), Where is France going? (1961) and Antimaxims (1973).

He died and was buried at Saint-Sébastien-de-Morsent.
