= Mini Lop =

Breed of rabbit

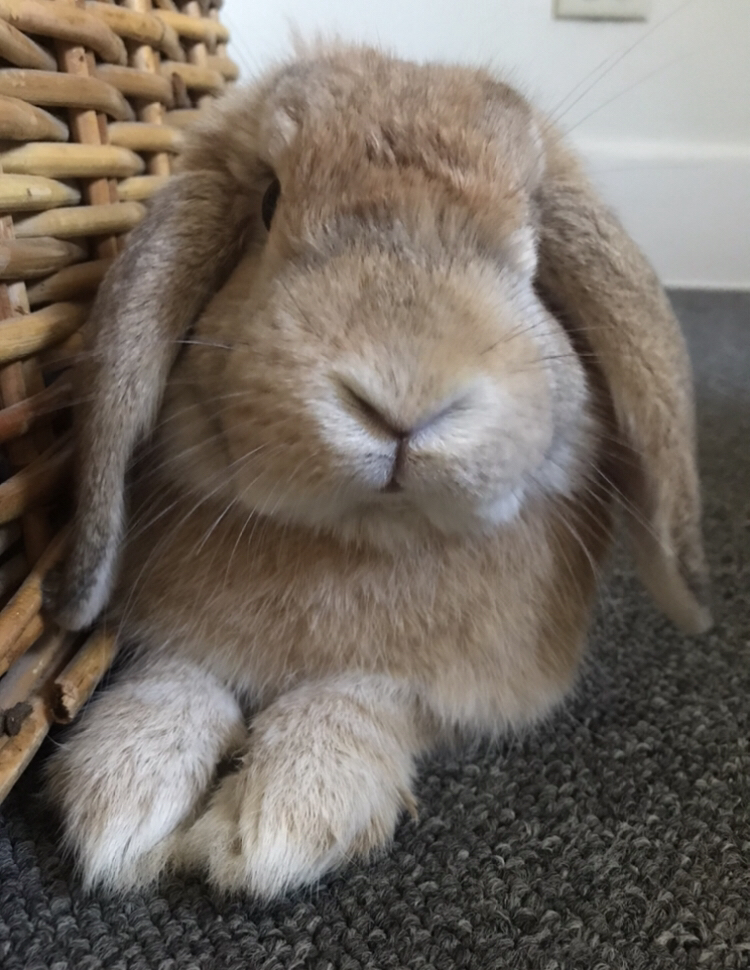
A solid Mini Lop

The Mini Lop is a breed of domestic rabbit that is recognized by the American Rabbit Breeders Association (ARBA). It is different from the Miniature Lop breed that is recognized by the British Rabbit Council (BRC). (In the UK, the Miniature Lop is sometimes called—for short—the "Mini Lop".) The Mini Lop [US] and the Miniature Lop [UK] are different from the Dwarf Lop breed that is recognized by the BRC (but not ARBA). The Mini Lop is similar to several other small rabbit breeds, such as the Dwarf rabbit.

== History ==
Bob Herschbach discovered the Mini Lop breed at a German National Rabbit Show in Essen, Germany in 1972, where it was known as a Klein Widder. These first Mini Lops were originated from the German Big Lop and the small Chinchilla. These two breeds came originally in Agouti and white colors.

German lops were about 8 pounds (3.6 kg), slender and large with thick ears. Herschbach, a Mini Lop promoter, achieved the first procreation of Mini Lops in the United States, mainly through breeding an agouti lop pair and a white female lop in 1972. Their first baby lops were solid colors. A second generation came with broken colors. As a result of the breeding process, they began to obtain a high standard of qualities Mini Lop.

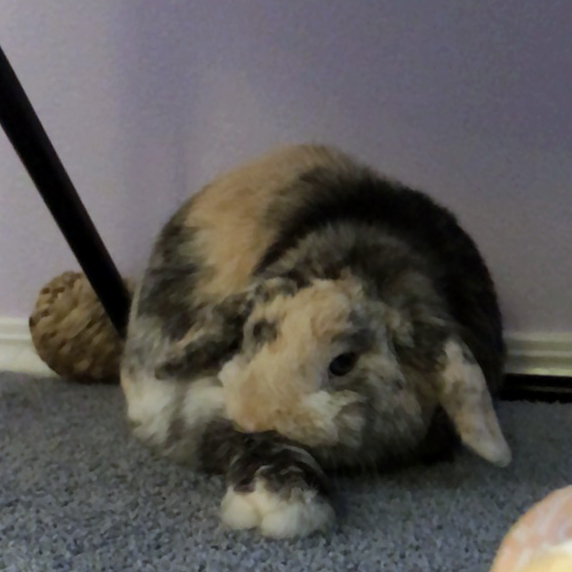
A picture of a mini lop grooming his right leg.

In 1974, Herschbach's Mini Lop rabbits made their debut in an American Rabbit Breeders' Association (ARBA) convention held in Ventura, California. The outcome was that the breed needed to be downsized to a more compact, attractive size. In order to achieve this, Herschbach enlisted the assistance of other breeders by letting them breed more of his Mini Lops. One final touch resulted in changing the breed name from Klein Widders to "Mini Lop" to make it more appealing to the public.

In 1977 the Mini Lop breed was under new sponsorship; Herb Dyke was the person in charge of this task.

In 1978, Herschbach and Dyke created a correspondence club for the Mini Lops. Within a year, they had over 500 members who had contacted the ARBA with support for the Mini Lop rabbit. In 1980, in Milwaukee, Wisconsin at the National Rabbit Convention, this breed marked its success when it was recognized as an official rabbit breed sanctioned by ARBA.

Shortly after, the Mini Lop Club of America was founded to promote it.

== Showing Mini Lops ==
The ideal Mini Lop is described as being a "basketball with a head". Judges like to see a nice rounded body with thick depth, long thick ears, a wide head and thick bone.

ARBA Accepted Colors

When showing Mini Lops the colors are broken down into two categories; Solids and Brokens. There are many colors available in this breed however only certain colors are accepted. Some of these colors are:

Chinchilla, Chestnut Agouti, Lynx, Opal, Black, White, Ruby-Eyed White, Blue-Eyed White, Blue, Chocolate, Lilac, Orange, Tri Color

Mini Lop Standard of Perfection

Schedule of points according to the ARBA Standard of Perfection:

General Type 80

- Body 43
- Head 20
- Ears and crown 12
- Feet, Legs & Bone 5
- Fur 10
- Color & Markings 5
- Condition 5

Weight Limits and showroom classes according to ARBA's Standard of Perfection:

- Senior Bucks- 6 months of age and older, weight 4.5 to 6.5 pounds (2 to 3 kg)
- Senior Does- 6 months of age and older, weight 3 to 6 pounds (1.4 to 2.7 kg)
- Junior Bucks and Does- Under 6 months, weight 3 to 6 pounds (1.4 to 2.7 kg)

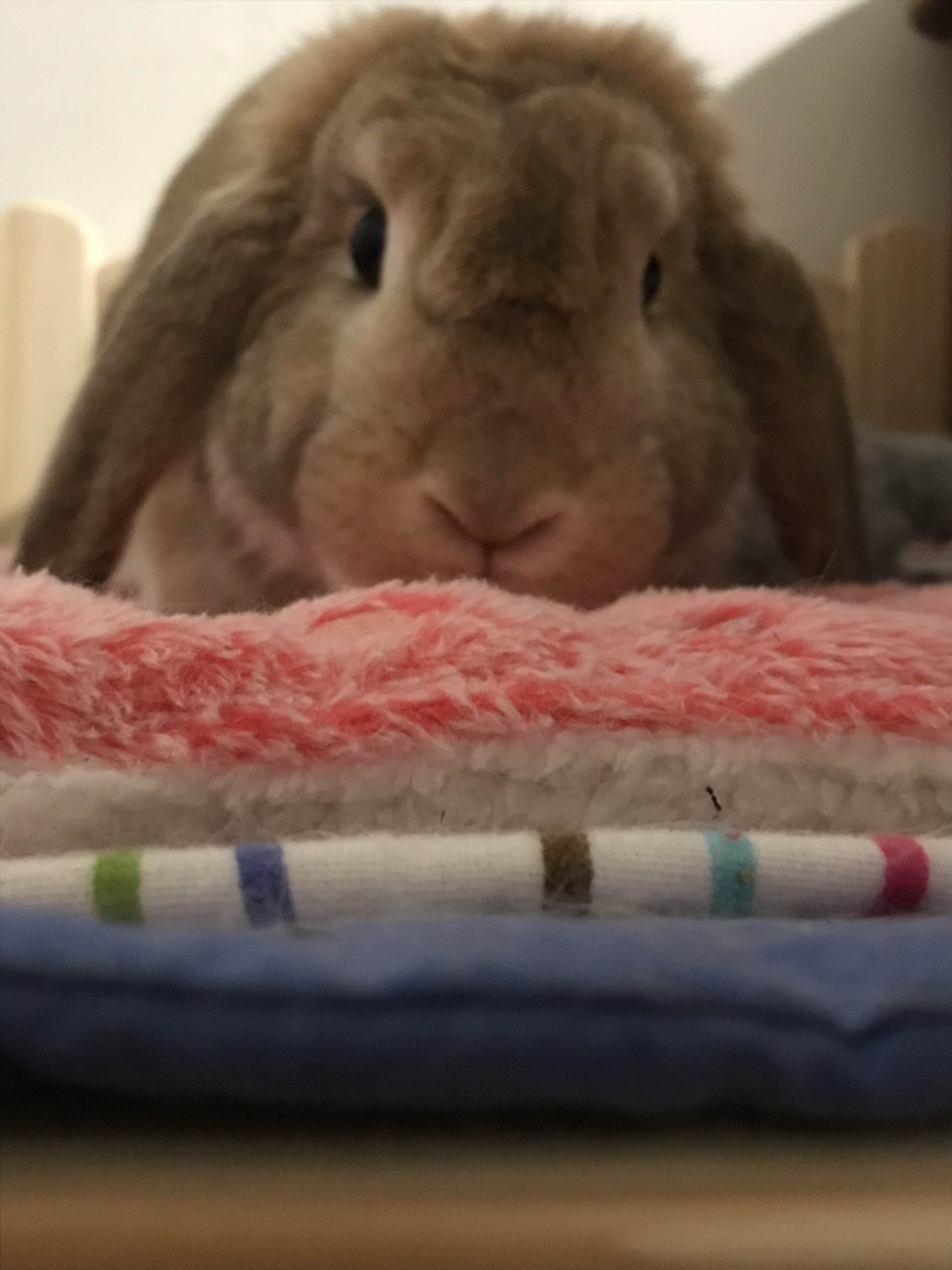
Mini Lop Relaxing

The Mini Lop rabbit is classified as a medium-sized rabbit. Senior Bucks and Does must be six months of age and older and weigh no more than 6.5 pounds (3 kg). Ideal weight is 5.5 pounds (2.5 kg). Junior Bucks and Does must be under six months of age and weigh less than 6 pounds (2.7 kg). The various colors within a variety are not judged separately. They are divided for judging into two groups, classifications, solid and broken pattern.

== See also ==
- List of rabbit breeds
- Dwarf rabbit
- House rabbit
- Lop rabbit
