= French Lop =

Breed of rabbit

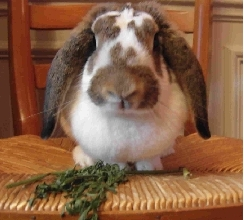
A French Lop rabbit

The French Lop is a breed of domestic rabbit developed in France in the 19th century from the selective breeding of English Lop and Flemish Giant stock. The French Lop resembles the English Lop, but the French Lop is heavier in stature and does not have the exaggerated ear length of the English Lop. Weighing approximately 4.98 kg to 5.21 kg, it has an average lifespan of five years or more. The French Lop is currently recognized by the American Rabbit Breeders Association (ARBA) and by the British Rabbit Council (BRC).

== History ==
The French Lop was first bred as a meat rabbit, beginning around 1850 in France. It is believed to have been produced by crossing two existing breeds, the English Lop and the Giant Papillon ("géant papillon français" or "Butterfly Rabbit of France"). The new breed became popular in neighbouring countries including the Netherlands, from which ten specimens were exported in 1933 to the UK for exhibition there. By the 1960s, the French Lop had become a mainstream breed in the UK, and in 1970-1971, the first French Lops were imported into the United States.

== Appearance ==
The French Lop is a very large rabbit, typically weighing around 10-15 pounds. They do not have a maximum weight in the show standard. Their ears are typically between 5 and 8 inches long and hang down below the jaw. They have a stout, thickset body and a large head. Males tend to have big round heads where the females are more pointed. The front legs are short and straight and the hind legs are carried parallel to the body. The French Lop has a dense, soft coat that comes in two colour varieties: solid and broken. Within these categories can be found a number of different colour variations, including agouti, black, chinchilla, and fawn.

== Behavior ==
Due to their relatively larger size in comparison to other breeds, the French Lop needs ample living space. They will not fare well in either outdoor or indoor cages. The French Lop is known to have a warm and relaxed temperament, and can even get along well with cats, dogs and young children. Care must be taken not to startle them, as they can still have heart attacks from fear. Health issues for the French Lop include sore hocks from too much weight, myxomatosis and arthritis.

== See also ==
- Domestic rabbit
- List of rabbit breeds
- Lop rabbit
- Netherland Dwarf
