= American Rabbit Breeders Association =

National animal club

The American Rabbit Breeders Association (ARBA) is a national club for domestic rabbits and cavy breeders. The ARBA is headquartered in Knox, Pennsylvania, in the United States. Its membership is composed of rabbit and cavy exhibitors, commercial breeders and pet owners in North America and many countries throughout the world.

The ARBA serves to promote the domestic rabbit and cavy fancy, as well as commercial rabbit production. The American Rabbit Breeders Association sets official breed standards for recognized rabbit breeds and cavy breeds. Every five years the ARBA publishes The Standard of Perfection. This book includes descriptions of a perfect example for each breed of rabbit or cavy, details all general disqualifications, includes a glossary of rabbit terms and describes the process of a breed or variety becoming recognized by the ARBA. The ARBA currently recognizes 53 breeds of rabbit and 13 cavy breeds.

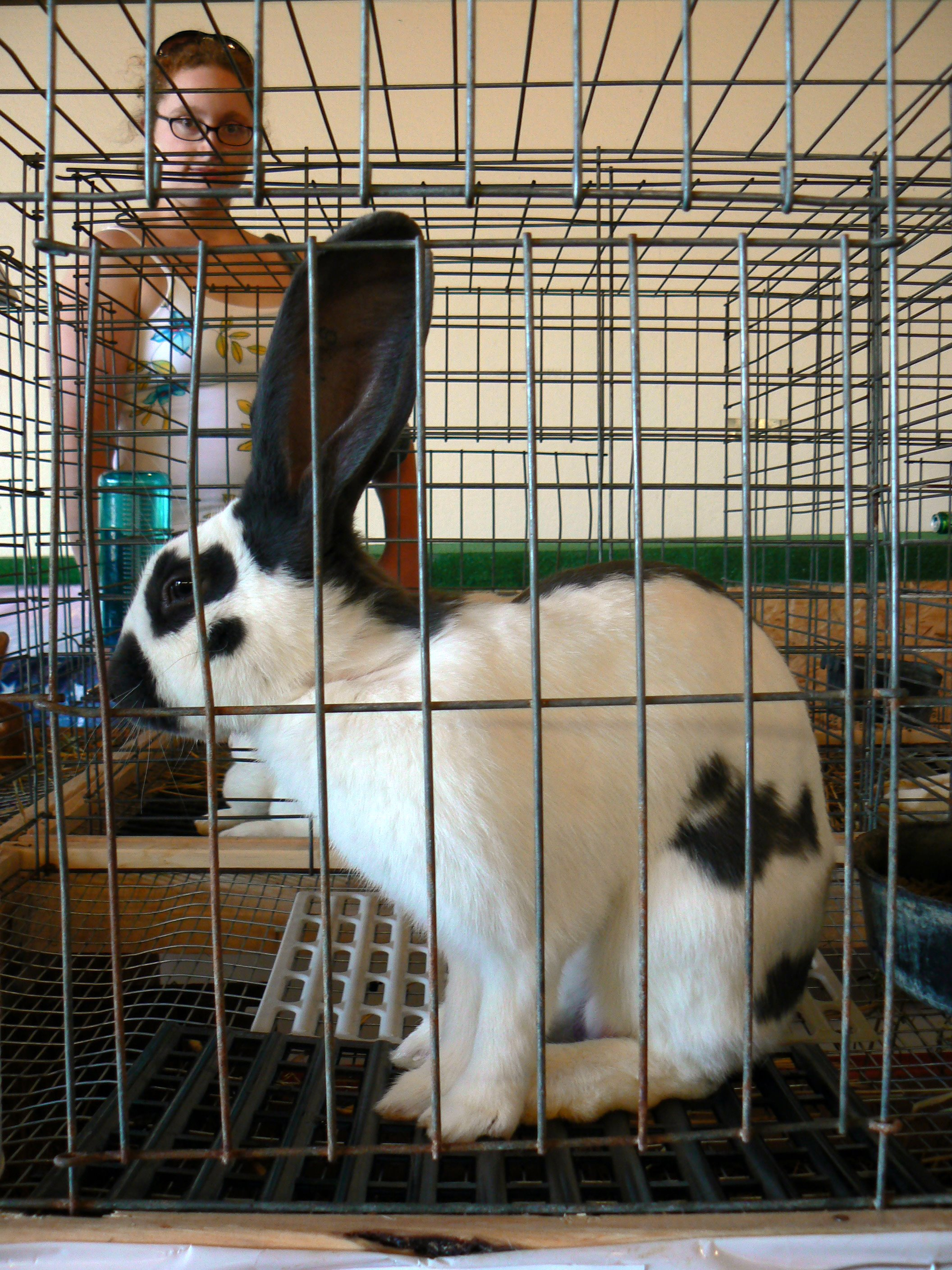
Checkered Giant rabbit

== Organization ==
The ARBA is run by a board of directors with one member elected from each of its nine districts. Additionally, the offices of President and Vice President are elected in organization-wide election. The ARBA also has two paid offices; Treasurer and executive director. These last two are appointed by the board of directors for a three-year term.

Despite its name, the American Rabbit Breeders Association has affiliated clubs and members all over the world. Each of these members are assigned a district, based on their location. The districts of the American Rabbit Breeders Association are as follows, according to their Constitution and By-Laws:

- District No. 1: Washington, Oregon, Idaho, Montana, Wyoming, Alaska, Northern Asia and Western Canada
- District No. 2: California, Nevada, Utah, Arizona, Hawaii, Southern Asia and Australia
- District No. 3: North Dakota, South Dakota, Nebraska, Minnesota, Iowa and Wisconsin
- District No. 4: Colorado, New Mexico, Texas, Oklahoma, Arkansas, Mexico and Central America
- District No. 5: Kansas, Missouri and Illinois
- District No. 6: Louisiana, Mississippi, Tennessee, Alabama, Georgia, Florida, South America and Puerto Rico
- District No. 7: New York, Vermont, Maine, New Hampshire, Massachusetts, Connecticut, Rhode Island, Europe and Eastern Canada
- District No. 8: Indiana, Ohio, Kentucky and Central Canada
- District No. 9: Pennsylvania, West Virginia, Virginia, New Jersey, Delaware, Maryland, North Carolina, South Carolina, Washington, D.C., and Africa.

== Rabbit shows ==
The ARBA sanctions rabbit shows throughout the year, all over the world. These shows, sponsored by local clubs, fairs, and national clubs give rabbit and cavy fanciers the chance to have their animals examined by educated judges and compared to other breeders' animals and the standard. The ARBA holds a large national convention show once a year, which draws in fanciers from across the country and around the world. The 2005 ARBA convention was documented in the film Rabbit Fever. The 2006 ARBA Convention was held in Ft. Worth, Texas, 2008 in Louisville, Kentucky, 2009 in San Diego, California, 2010 in Minneapolis, Minnesota, 2011 in Indianapolis, Indiana, 2012 in Wichita, Kansas, 2013 in Harrisburg, Pennsylvania, 2014 in Ft. Worth, Texas, 2015 in Portland, Oregon, 2016 in San Diego, California, 2017 in Indianapolis, Indiana, 2018 in West Springfield, Massachusetts, 2019 in Reno, Nevada, the 2020 Convention would have been held in Harrisburg, Pennsylvania, but it was canceled. The 2021 Convention was held in Louisville, Kentucky, and the 2022 in Reno, Nevada. The 2023 (and 100th) Convention was held in Louisville, Kentucky.

== Unified judging and registration system ==
The ARBA has a standardized judging system in which rabbits are judged against the respective breed standard, set by a 100-point scale, and published in the Standard of Perfection. It is a book detailing all of the recognized breeds in the United States and their attributes. The association has licensed judges since the early 1900s who may judge at sanctioned shows and fairs. The registration system maintains records on all rabbits which have passed a registration examination to ensure the animals are healthy and meet the ARBA Standard for the rabbits' breed. ARBA licensed registrars conduct the examination. Registrations are ranked Red, White and Blue to distinguish how many ancestors of the subject rabbit have been previously registered.

== ARBA Library and Hall of Fame ==
The ARBA Library, located at the headquarters in Knox, Pennsylvania, houses the world's largest single repository of books and writings on domestic rabbits. It is an archival library, not a lending library. It holds over 10,000 items/pieces, which are housed in the collection, and it continues to constantly grow. The next largest similar collection is at the United States National Agricultural Library in Maryland, and it holds about 1,300 pieces. The British Library, London also has an extensive collection. Access to the Library for research by members is available by appointment only.
