= List of rabbit breeds =

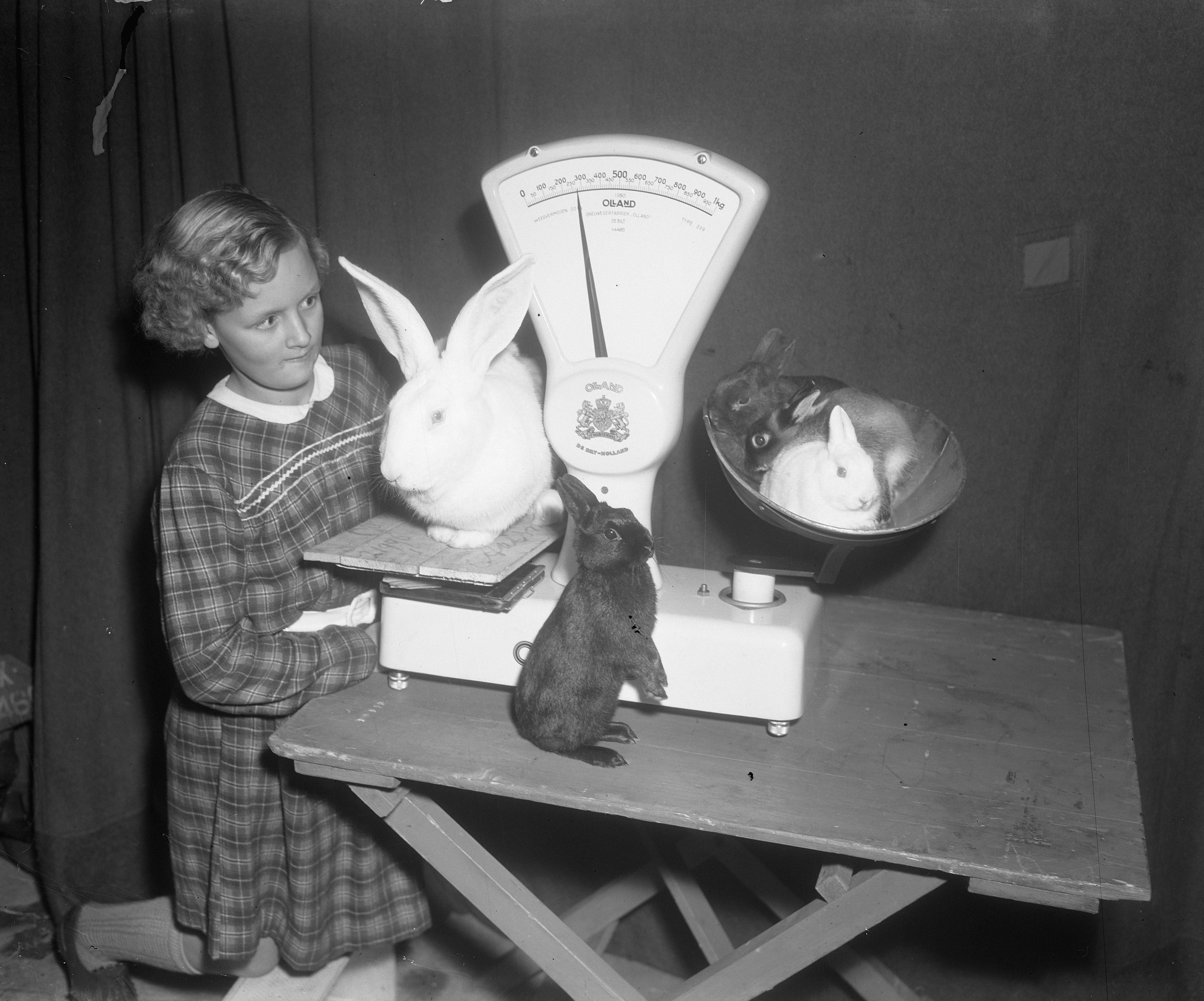
Different breeds of rabbit at an exhibition in the Netherlands, 1952

As of 2017, there were at least 305 breeds of the domestic rabbit in many countries around the world raised for in the agricultural practice of breeding and raising domestic rabbits as livestock for their value in meat, fur, wool, education, scientific research, entertainment and companionship in cuniculture. A rabbit breed is a distinct strain created through selective breeding (or occasionally natural selection) for specific characteristics, including size, fur, body type, color, feed conversion ratio, et cetera. Organizations such as the American Rabbit Breeders Association (ARBA) and the British Rabbit Council (BRC) have standards for the desired qualities of their respective recognized breeds. Each rabbit breed is considered to benefit when a reputable breeder strives to emulate the perfect example for the breed, defined by the individual breed standard by which it may be judged. The global diversity of breeds reflects the breadth of the rabbit's unique qualities. Listed below are 191 of the world's modern-day rabbit breeds.

== Modern-day rabbit breeds ==
= Rare breeds (Note: Rare here denotes a breed currently included in the BRC's "Rare Varieties Club" or (because ARBA does not designate rarity) The Livestock Conservancy's "Conservation Priority List". For breeds not recognized by either ARBA or the BRC, the designation of rarity is left to the conclusion of the cited authority.)

* indicates "Rabbits in COUNTRY or TERRITORY" links.

Breed name (Note: Breed name here is the name—and in the form of the name—that is recognized by the authority of record. Other well-known forms of the breed name may be secondarily included. When different countries use a different name for the same breed of rabbit, that is noted.)	Image (Note: Image strives to display a specimen of the breed that depicts its distinguishing attributes.)	Size (Note: Size listed here is the range of allowed weights or is a single measurement representing either the ideal weight or the average weight. Sizes refer to that of adult animals. All measurements listed come from the breed standard or other authoritative source.)	Fur type (Note: Fur type is here categorized as Short, Medium, Long, Rex–Straight–Short, Rex–Curly–Short, Rex–Curly–Medium or Rex–Curly–Long.)	Ear type (Note: Ear type is here categorized as either Erect or Lop.)	Colors & markings (Note: Colors & markings listed here include (verbatim) those currently recognized by ARBA or the BRC, or as described by the cited authority (in which case they are surrounded by quotation marks). Information in [square brackets] is a summary of the source material. Unless otherwise indicated, the color is a "self" color.)	ARBA recognized? (Note: ARBA recognized? is listed as Yes or No indicating whether the breed is currently recognized by the American Rabbit Breeders Association, according to the ARBA website or their Standard of Perfection 2016-2020.)	BRC recognized? (Note: BRC recognized? is listed as Yes or No indicating whether the breed is currently recognized by the British Rabbit Council, according to the BRC website or their Breed Standards 2016-2020.)	Origin (Note: Origin listed here is the country or geographic area in which the breed was first considered to have become distinct. The information in this column comes almost exclusively from the work of rabbit-breed historian Bob D. Whitman)
Alaska		7–9 lb (3.2–4.1 kg)	Short	Erect	Black	No	Yes	European Union; Germany
Altex		13 lb (5.9 kg)	Short	Erect	Pointed White	No	No	United States; Alabama; Texas
American		9–12 lb (4.1–5.4 kg)	Short	Erect	Blue, White	Yes	No	United States; California
American Chinchilla [US] See also: Chinchilla		9–12 lb (4.1–5.4 kg)	Short	Erect	Chinchilla	Yes	No	United States New York
American Fuzzy Lop		3.5–4 lb (1.6–1.8 kg)	Long	Lop	[All solid or broken colors/patterns]	Yes	No	United States California
American Sable		7–10 lb (3.2–4.5 kg)	Short	Erect	Sable	Yes	No	United States; California
Angora		4.4–12.1 lb (2.0–5.5 kg)	Long	Erect	Albino or Colored	Yes	Yes	Turkey
Argente Bleu	Image	6 lb (2.7 kg)	Short	Erect	[Argente Bleu markings] (Note: For the Argente Bleu, the BRC states: "Undercolour lavender blue, body colour bluish white, [...] interspersed with longer dark blue hairs to give a distinct bluish effect.")	No	Yes	European Union; France
Argente Brun [UK]	Image	6 lb (2.7 kg)	Short	Erect	[Argente Brun [UK] markings] (Note: For the Argente Brun [UK], the BRC states: "Undercolour as deep brown as possible, body colour brownish-white, the whole evenly and moderately interspersed with longer dark brown hairs to give a distinct brownish effect when viewed from a distance.")	No	Yes	United Kingdom; England
Argente Brun [US]	Image	8–10.5 lb (3.6–4.8 kg)	Medium	Erect	[Argente Brun [US] markings] (Note: For the Argente Brun [US], ARBA states: "Surface color is to be an even silvered or frosted chocolate brown throughout. While evenness is stressed, slightly darker muzzle butterfly, ears and feet are desirable. Longer, dark brown guard hairs are to be evenly interspersed over the entire pelt. The under color is to be a rich chocolate ideally carried right to the skin.")	Yes	No	Canada
Argente Clair	Image	6 lb (2.7 kg)	Short	Erect	[Blue base heavily silvered]	No	No	European Union; France
Argente Crème [UK] See also: Creme d'Argent [US]	Image	5 lb (2.3 kg)	Short	Erect	[Argente Crème markings] (Note: For the Argente Crème, the BRC states: "Undercolour orange [...] body colour creamy white [...] interspersed with longer orange hairs to give a distinctly creamy effect.")	No	Yes	European Union; France
Argente de Champagne [UK] See also: Champagne d'Argent [US]		9–12 lb (4.1–5.4 kg)	Short	Erect	[Argente de Champagne markings] (Note: For the Argente de Champagne, the BRC states: "The main body to be bluish white in the adult, interspersed with longer jet black guard hairs to bring out the shade termed Old Silver [italics added] when viewed from a distance. The ears, nose and muzzle may be a slightly darker shade. The belly and underside of the tail more matt[e]. Undercolour to be dark slate blue extended down to the base of the hair shaft. A blackish delimitation band immediately under the top colour is permissible.")	No	Yes	European Union; France
Argente Noir	Image	6 lb (2.7 kg)	Short	Erect	[Argente Noir markings] (Note: For the Argente Noir, the BRC states: "Undercolour deep slate blue, body colour greyish white,[...] interspersed with longer black hairs to give a distinct 'old silver' effect.")	No	Yes	European Union; France
Argente St Hubert	Image	6 lb (2.7 kg)	Short	Erect	[Argente St Hubert markings] (Note: For the Argente St Hubert, the BRC states: "Under colour to be dark blue at the base with rich orange intermediate band together with a very narrow chestnut top band. [...] Body colour to be a creamy white [...] interspersed with jet black guard hairs to give a creamy chestnut shade.")	No	Yes	European Union; France
Armenian Marder	Image	8.8–9.9 lb (4.0–4.5 kg)	Short	Erect	[Dark Brown or Light Brown (either having light to heavy chinchillation)]	No	No	Armenia
Astrex; See also: Rex [US]	Image	6–8 lb (2.7–3.6 kg)	Rex; Curly; Short	Erect	"Any [BRC-]recognised Rex Colour."	No	Yes	United Kingdom; England
Aurora Negro		—N/a	—N/a	—N/a	—N/a	No	No	Guatemala
Baladi Black		6.0 lb (2.7 kg)	Short	Erect	Black	No	No	Egypt
Baladi Red	Image	6.2 lb (2.8 kg)	Short	Erect	Red	No	No	Egypt
Baladi White		4.3 lb (1.95 kg)	Short	Erect	White	No	No	Egypt
Bauscat	Image	8 lb (3.6 kg)	Short	Erect	Albino	No	No	Egypt
Beige [UK] See also: Czech Solver [CZ] Separator [DE]		5–6.5 lb (2.3–2.9 kg)	Short	Erect	"Dark Chamois or light sandy colour, down to the skin, faintly ticked with blue."	No	Yes	United Kingdom
Belgian Hare [UK]		8–9 lb (3.6–4.1 kg)	Short	Erect	"Rich, deep chestnut red, well extended down the sides. Black ticking of a wavy or blotchy appearance, plentiful on body; chest and face free."	No	Yes	European Union; Belgium
Belgian Hare [US]		8–9.5 lb (3.6–4.3 kg)	Short	Erect	"Deep red 'rufous' coat with black, wavy ticking."	Yes	No	European Union; Belgium
Beveren [UK] See also: Pointed Beveren	Image	8 lb (3.6 kg)	Medium	Erect	Black, Blue, Brown, Lilac, White [with blue eyes]	No	Yes	European Union; Belgium
Beveren [US]	Image	8–12 lb (3.6–5.4 kg)	Medium	Erect	Black, Blue, White [with blue eyes]	Yes	No	European Union; Belgium
Big Silver Marten; Also called: Große Weißgrannen [de] Veliki Bijeloopaljeni Kunić [hr] See also: Silver Marten		8–12 lb (3.6–5.4 kg)	Short	Erect	[Black, Blue, or Havana with white and/or tan markings, plus white ticking on the lower body]	No	No	European Union; Croatia
Blanc de Bouscat		11–15.5 lb (5.0–7.0 kg)	Short	Erect	"Completely snow white [...]. Guard hairs sprinkled regularly all over the coat give it a brilliant frosty look."	No	Yes	European Union; France
Blanc de Hotot		8–11 lb (3.6–5.0 kg)	Short	Erect	White with dark rings around the eyes	Yes	Yes	European Union; France
Blanc de Popielno; Also called: Popielański Biały [pl] Popielno White	Image	8.8–11.0 lb (4–5 kg)	Short	Erect	Albino	No	No	European Union; Poland
Blanc de Termonde	Image	9–12 lb (4.1–5.4 kg)	Short	Erect	"Immaculately white. Eyes are ruby red"	No	Yes	European Union; Belgium
Blue of Ham	Image	9.9–13.2 lb (4.5–6 kg)	Long	Erect	"Slate blue with a blue sub-color" but "not as dark as the blue Vienna"	No	No	European Union; Belgium
Blue of Sint-Niklaas		5–12 lb (2.3–5.4 kg)	Short	Erect	Blue	No	No	European Union; Belgium
Bourbonnais Grey; Also called: Gris du Bourbonnais [fr]		7–11 lb (3.2–5.0 kg)	Short	Erect	"Overall color is slate blue with longer gray guard hairs tipped black."	No	No	European Union; France
Brazilian	Image	7–11 lb (3.2–5.0 kg)	Short	Erect	—N/a	No	No	Brazil
Britannia Petite [US] See also: Polish [UK]		1.5–2.5 lb (0.68–1.13 kg)	Short	Erect	Black, Black Otter, Blue-Eyed White, Chestnut, Red-Eyed White, Sable Marten	Yes	No	
British Giant		12.5–25 lb (5.7–11.3 kg)	Short	Erect	Black, Blue, Brown Grey, Dark Steel Grey, Opal, White	No	Yes	United Kingdom; England
Brown Chestnut of Lorraine; Also called: Brun Marron de Lorraine [fr]	Image	4.4–5.3 lb (2.0–2.4 kg)	Short	Erect	"Chestnut brown uniform color with a well-defined orange-brown outer-color. Under-color bluish including the belly. Ears bluish on their inner side and edged with a black border."	No	No	European Union; France
Caldes	Image	9.5–9.9 lb (4.3–4.5 kg)	Short	Erect	Red-Eyed White	No	No	European Union; Spain
Californian [UK]		7.5–9.5 lb (3.4–4.3 kg)	Short	Erect	Four varieties, all being white (with red eyes) with dark points: Normal ("dark sepia" points), Chocolate ("milk chocolate" points), Blue ("slate blue" points), or Lilac ("pink shade of dove" points)	No	Yes	United States; California
Californian [US]		9–10.5 lb (4.1–4.8 kg)	Short	Erect	One variety, being white (with red eyes) with dark points: Standard (black points)	Yes	No	United States; California
Canadian Plush Lop; See also: Rex [US]	Image	3.5–6.5 lb (1.6–2.9 kg)	Rex; Curly; Medium	Lop	[Includes at least 19 stated colors/patterns]	No	No	Canada
Carmagnola Grey	Image	7.7–9.9 lb (3.5–4.5 kg)	Short	Erect	[Chinchilla]	No	No	European Union; Italy
Cashmere Lop; See also: Miniature Cashmere Lop		4.25–5.25 lb (1.93–2.38 kg)	Long	Lop	[Includes >35 different colors/patterns] (Note: For the Cashmere Lop, the BRC recognizes five groups of colors/patterns: Self Colours (includes Black, Blue, Blue-Eyed White, Chocolate, Lilac, Red-Eyed White), Agouti Patterns (includes Agouti, Chinchilla, Cinnamon, Lynx, Opal, Squirrel), Shaded Colours (includes Beige, Bluepoint, Chocolate Torte, Iron Grey, Sable, Sealpoint, Siamese, Siamese Smoke, Sooty Fawn), Tan Patterns (includes Fox-Black, Fox-Blue, Fox-Chocolate, Fox-Lilac, Otter-Black, Otter-Blue, Otter-Chocolate, Otter-Lilac, Marten Sable, Marten Smoke), Other Colours (includes Butterfly, Fawn, Orange, Steel), and "Any other [BRC] colour [...] excluding Broken Pattern.")	No	Yes	United Kingdom; England
Champagne d'Argent [US] See also: Argente de Champagne [UK]		9–12 lb (4.1–5.4 kg)	Short	Erect	[Champagne d'Argent markings] (Note: For the Champagne d'Argent, ARBA states: "[...] the surface color should be as near the color of skimmed milk, old silver, or light ultramarine (meaning washed out blue) as is possible. Fur over entire body should carry a liberal sprinkling of longer black guard hairs.")	Yes	No	European Union; France
Chaudry		8–9 lb (3.6–4.1 kg)	Short	Erect	Red-Eyed White	No	No	European Union; France
Checkered Giant [US] See also: Giant Papillon [UK]		11–25 lb (5.0–11.3 kg)	Short	Erect	Black (i.e, white with black markings), Blue (i.e., white with gray markings)	Yes	No	European Union; Germany
Chinchilla; See main entries: American Chinchilla [US] Chinchilla [UK] Chinchilla Giganta [UK] Giant Chinchilla [US] Standard Chinchilla [US]	—N/a	—N/a	—N/a	—N/a	—N/a	—N/a	—N/a	—N/a
Chinchilla [UK]		7 lb (3.2 kg)	Short	Erect	"To resemble real Chinchilla."	No	Yes	European Union; France
Chinchilla Giganta [UK]		8.5–12 lb (3.9–5.4 kg)	Short	Erect	[Chinchilla, but with] "Desired top colour considerably darker grey than the Chinchilla [i.e., Chinchilla [UK]] rabbit."	No	Yes	European Union; France
Cinnamon	Image	10–11 lb (4.5–5.0 kg)	Short	Erect	Cinnamon	Yes	No	United States; Montana
Continental Giant Coloured	Image	12.4–25 lb (5.6–11.3 kg)	Short	Erect	Agouti, Black, Chinchilla, Dark Steel, Light Steel, Opal, Red Agouti, Yellow	No	Yes	European Union
Continental Giant White	Image	11–25 lb (5.0–11.3 kg)	Short	Erect	"Immaculate white, eyes pink or blue."	No	Yes	European Union
Creme d'Argent [US] See also: Argente Crème [UK]	Image	8–11 lb (3.6–5.0 kg)	Short	Erect	"Creamy white with an orange cast"	Yes	No	European Union; France
Criollo		3–4 lb (1.4–1.8 kg)	Short	Erect	"Many colors and patterns."	No	No	Mexico
Cuban Brown		9.9–11.0 lb (4.5–5 kg)	Short	Erect	Glossy brown	No	No	Cuba
Czech Red		4–5 lb (1.8–2.3 kg)	Short	Erect	Chestnut	No	No	
Czech Solver [CZ] Also called: Český Luštič; See also: Beige [UK] Separator [DE]		7.9–8.6 lb (3.6–3.9 kg)	Short	Erect	[sandy colored]	No	No	European Union; Czech Republic
Czech Spot		6–8 lb (2.7–3.6 kg)	Short	Erect	Agouti, Black, Blue, Isabella (Beige), Tortoise, Tri-color	No	No	European Union; Czech Republic
Czech White; Also called: Český Albín		8.8–11.0 lb (4.0–5.0 kg)	Short	Erect	White	No	No	European Union; Czech Republic
Dalmatian		6–8 lb (2.7–3.6 kg)	Rex; Straight; Short	Erect	White with "numerous little coloured patches" of "black, blue, brown, orange, or fawn".	No	Yes	European Union; France
Deilenaar		5–8 lb (2.3–3.6 kg)	Short	Erect	Red Agouti	No	Yes	European Union; Netherlands
Dutch [UK]		4.5–5 lb (2.0–2.3 kg)	Short	Erect	["Dutch" markings on] Black, Blue, Brown Grey, Chocolate, Pale Grey, Steel Grey, Tortoiseshell, Yellow	No	Yes	United Kingdom; England
Dutch [US]		3.5–5.5 lb (1.6–2.5 kg)	Short	Erect	Black Dutch, Blue Dutch, Chinchilla Dutch, Chocolate Dutch, Gray Dutch, Steel Dutch, Tortoise Dutch	Yes	No	United Kingdom; England
Dutch (Tri-Colour); See main entry: Tri-Colour Dutch	—N/a	—N/a	—N/a	—N/a	—N/a	—N/a	—N/a	—N/a
Dwarf Hotot		2–3 lb (0.91–1.36 kg)	Short	Erect	White with black around the eyes	Yes	No	European Union; Germany
Dwarf Lop [UK] See also: Mini Lop [US]		4.25–5.25 lb (1.93–2.38 kg)	Short	Lop	[Many]	No	Yes	European Union; Germany
Elfin; See main entry: Swedish Hare	—N/a	—N/a	—N/a	—N/a	—N/a	—N/a	—N/a	—N/a
Enderby Island		3–4 lb (1.4–1.8 kg)	Short	Erect	"Silver-grey" (with chinchillation) or "Cream or beige"	No	No	Australia *
English Angora		5–8 lb (2.3–3.6 kg)	Long	Erect	[Many]	Yes	Yes	European Union; France
English Lop		10–11 lb (4.5–5.0 kg)	Short	Lop	[Many]	Yes	Yes	United Kingdom; England
English Spot		5–8 lb (2.3–3.6 kg)	Short	Erect	White with colored butterfly pattern	Yes	Yes	United Kingdom; England
Fauve de Bourgogne		7–11 lb (3.2–5.0 kg)	Short	Erect	Orange/Red	No	Yes	European Union; France
Fee de Marbourg; See main entry: Marburger Feh [UK]	—N/a	—N/a	—N/a	—N/a	—N/a	—N/a	—N/a	—N/a
Feh de Marbourg [FR] See main entry: Marburger Feh [UK]	—N/a	—N/a	—N/a	—N/a	—N/a	—N/a	—N/a	—N/a
Feu Noir [FR] See main entry: Tan	—N/a	—N/a	—N/a	—N/a	—N/a	—N/a	—N/a	—N/a
Flemish Giant [UK]		11–25 lb (5.0–11.3 kg)	Short	Erect	"Dark steel grey, with even or wavy ticking [...] except belly & under tail which shall be white [...]."	No	Yes	European Union; Belgium
Flemish Giant [US]		14–25 lb (6.4–11.3 kg)	Short	Erect	Black, Blue, Fawn, Light Grey, Sandy, Steel, White	Yes	No	European Union; Belgium
Florida White		4–6 lb (1.8–2.7 kg)	Short	Erect	White	Yes	No	United States; Florida
Fox	Image	6.6–11.0 lb (3–5 kg)	Long	Erect	"It is most common in the color white."	No	No	Switzerland
Fox–Silver [UK] See also: Silver Fox [US]		5.5–7 lb (2.5–3.2 kg)	Short	Erect	Black, Blue, Chocolate, Lilac	No	Yes	United Kingdom; England
French Angora		7.5–10.5 lb (3.4–4.8 kg)	Long	Erect	[Many]	Yes	No	European Union; France
French Lop		10 lb (4.5 kg)	Short	Lop	[Many]	Yes	Yes	European Union; France
Gabali	Image	6–7 lb (2.7–3.2 kg)	Short	Erect	Agouti	No	No	Egypt
German Angora	Image	5.5–12.1 lb (2.5–5.5 kg)	Long	Erect	[Albino or colored (but not bi-colored)]	No	No	European Union; Germany
German Lop		6–8 lb (2.7–3.6 kg)	Short	Lop	[Many]	No	Yes	European Union; Germany
Giant Angora		10 lb (4.5 kg)	Long	Erect	—	Yes	No	United States; Massachusetts
Giant Chinchilla [US] See also: Chinchilla		10–16 lb (4.5–7.3 kg)	Short	Erect	Chinchilla	Yes	No	United States; Missouri
Giant Havana; Also called: Stor Havana [da] Stora Havana [se] See also: Havana [UK] Havana [US]	Image	10–11 lb (4.6–5 kg)	Short	Erect	"Dark brown and glossy color. The eyes are brown, but from certain points of view they are ruby red."	No	No	European Union; Sweden
Giant Marburger; Also called: Stor Marburger Egern [da] See also: Marburger Feh [UK]	Image	10–11 lb (4.6–5 kg)	Medium	Erect	"A grey-blue outer color with a brownish undertone."	No	No	European Union; Denmark
Giant Papillon [UK] See also: Checkered Giant [US] Miniature Papillon		11–25 lb (5.0–11.3 kg)	Short	Erect	[Colored butterfly, eye circles, cheek spots, ear base, saddle, and rump spots; all on a base of white.] "All [BRC] recognised colours are admissible."	No	Yes	European Union; Germany
Giant Silver; Also called: Stor Sølv [da] Stora Sølv [se] See also: Silver [UK] Silver [US]	Image	10–11 lb (4.6–5 kg)	Short	Erect	"The entire body has a black base color mixed with hair with white tips that gives the rabbit a silver sheen."	No	No	European Union; France
Giant Smoke Pearl; Also called: Stor Zobel [da] Stora Zobel [se] See also: Smoke Pearl	Image	8.8–11.0 lb (4–5 kg)	Short	Erect	"A mixture of brown, so-called sepia-colored and beige tones" [with darker points].	No	No	European Union; Germany
Giza White	Image	5.6–7.6 lb (2.53–3.45 kg)	Short	Erect	Albino	No	No	Egypt
Golden Glavcot	Image	5–6 lb (2.3–2.7 kg)	Short	Erect	—	No	Yes	United Kingdom; England
Gotland		6.6–9 lb (3.0–4.1 kg)	Short	Erect	—	No	No	European Union; Sweden
Gouwenaar	Image	5.5–7.1 lb (2.5–3.2 kg)	Short	Erect	"The body color has a light grey-blue tone throughout the body."	No	No	European Union; Netherlands
Grey Pearl of Halle; Also called: Gris Perle de Hal; Lille Egern; Parelgrijze van Halle	Image	5.5–7.1 lb (2.5–3.2 kg)	Short	Erect	"The body color is a light grey-blue tone throughout the body."	No	No	European Union; Belgium
Güzelçamlı		5–8 lb (2.3–3.6 kg)	Short	Erect	White with chocolate markings	No	No	Turkey
Harlequin [UK]		6–8 lb (2.7–3.6 kg)	Short	Erect	Harlequin (includes: Black, Blue, Brown, Lilac); Magpie (includes: Black, Blue, Brown, Lilac)	No	Yes	European Union; France
Harlequin [US]		6–9 lb (2.7–4.1 kg)	Short	Erect	Japanese (includes: Black, Blue, Chocolate, Lilac); Magpie (includes: Black, Blue, Chocolate, Lilac)	Yes	No	European Union; France
Harlequin Dutch; See main entry: Tri-Colour Dutch	—N/a	—N/a	—N/a	—N/a	—N/a	—N/a	—N/a	—N/a
Harlequin Rex; Also called: Magpie Rex; Japanese Rex		6–8 lb (2.7–3.6 kg)	Rex; Straight; Short	Erect	[ Same as for Harlequin [UK] ]	No	Yes	European Union; France
Havana [UK] See also: Giant Havana	Image	5.5–6.5 lb (2.5–2.9 kg)	Short	Erect	"A rich, dark chocolate with a purplish sheen, [...] pearl-grey undercolour."	No	Yes	European Union; Netherlands
Havana [US] See also: Giant Havana		4.5–6.5 lb (2.0–2.9 kg)	Short	Erect	Black, Blue, Broken, Chocolate, Lilac	Yes	No	European Union; Netherlands
Himalayan; Also called: Russian		6–8 lb (2.7–3.6 kg)	Short	Erect	White with points of either black, blue, chocolate, or lilac	Yes	Yes	China
Holland Lop [US] See also: Miniature Lop [UK/NL]		4–6.5 lb (1.8–2.9 kg)	Short	Lop	Agouti, Broken, Pointed White, Self Colors, Shaded Colors, Tan Pattern, Ticked, Wide Band	Yes	No	European Union; Netherlands
Hulstlander	Image	4–6 lb (1.8–2.7 kg)	Short	Erect	White with blue eyes	No	Yes	European Union; Netherlands
Hungarian Giant	Image	11–15 lb (5–7 kg)	Short	Erect	[Many]	No	No	European Union; Hungary
Isabella	Image	6.6–8.8 lb (3–4 kg)	Short	Erect	"The yellowish brown color is 'coated' with a blue veil, caused by blue hair tips. In front of the head there is the 'mask', which when seen from the front, is oval."	No	No	European Union; Sweden
Jamora	Image	4.2–5.3 lb (1.9–2.4 kg)	Long	Erect	"[L]ike [Harlequin or] Japanese. The most common color is black / yellow, but black and white may occur."	No	No	European Union; Germany
Japanese Dutch; See main entry: Tri-Colour Dutch	—N/a	—N/a	—N/a	—N/a	—N/a	—N/a	—N/a	—N/a
Japanese White; Also called: 日本白色種 [ja] Includes: ジャンボうさぎ [ja] Jumbo Usagi		6.6–22.0 lb (3–10 kg)	Short	Erect	Albino	No	No	Japan
Jersey Wooly		2.5–3.5 lb (1.1–1.6 kg)	Long	Erect	[Many]	Yes	No	United States; New Jersey
Kabyle	Image	4.4–6.6 lb (2.0–3.0 kg)	Short	Erect	[Many]	No	No	Algeria
Lilac [UK]	Image	5.5–7 lb (2.5–3.2 kg)	Short	Erect	"An even pink shade of dove colour"	No	Yes	United Kingdom; England
Lilac [US]	Image	5–8 lb (2.3–3.6 kg)	Short	Erect	"Pinkish dove-gray"	Yes	No	United Kingdom; England
Lionhead [UK]		3.0–3.7 lb (1.36–1.7 kg)	Long	Erect	"All [BRC] recognised colour[s] and pattern[s]"	No	Yes	European Union France; Belgium
Lionhead [US]		3.25–3.75 lb (1.47–1.70 kg)	Long	Erect	Chocolate, Ruby-Eyed White, Seal, Siamese Sable, Tortoise (includes Black, Blue, Chocolate, Lilac)	Yes	No	European Union France; Belgium
Liptov Baldspotted Rabbit; Also called: Liptovský lysko	Image	8.8–9.4 lb (4–4.25 kg)	Short	Erect	Agouti, Blue-Agouti, or Black	No	No	European Union; Slovakia
Lynx; Also called: Luchskaninchen; Lux	Image	5.5–7.1 lb (2.5–3.2 kg)	Short	Erect	"Lux has a wild factor and the outermost part of the hair is light grey. Under this color, the middle color is reddish-brown. The middle color is so high that it shines through the entire color. The entire color therefore appears as a reddish-brown tone 'coated' with a light grey-blue cut."	No	No	European Union; Germany
Marburger Feh [UK] Originally named: Fee de Marbourg; Renamed: Feh de Marbourg [FR] See also: Giant Marburger		4.15–7.2 lb (1.88–3.27 kg)	Short	Erect	[Lilac:] "The top colour is a delicately toned light blue which appears to be covered with a brownish veil."	No	Yes	European Union; France
Mecklenburger Piebald; Also called: Mecklenburger Schecke		9.9–12.1 lb (4.5–5.5 kg)	Medium	Erect	"[Broken pattern: mostly solid color with neck, chest, belly, legs. Includes Agouti, Black, Blue, Red, Steel]"	No	No	European Union; Germany
Meissner Lop		10–12 lb (4.5–5.4 kg)	Short	Lop	[Many]	No	Yes	European Union; Germany
Mellerud rabbit		6.6–7.7 lb (3.0–3.5 kg)	Short	Erect	Albino, Black with inexact "Dutch" markings	No	No	European Union; Sweden
Mini Cashmere Lop; See main entry: Miniature Cashmere Lop	—N/a	—N/a	—N/a	—N/a	—N/a	—N/a	—N/a	—N/a
Mini Lion Lop; See main entry: Miniature Lion Lop	—N/a	—N/a	—N/a	—N/a	—N/a	—N/a	—N/a	—N/a
Mini Lop [US] Not to be confused with: Miniature Lop [UK/NL]		5–6 lb (2.3–2.7 kg)	Short	Lop	[To be supplied]	Yes	No	European Union; Netherlands
Mini Rex; See also: Rex [US]		3–4.5 lb (1.4–2.0 kg)	Rex; Straight; Short	Erect	Black, Blue, Castor, Chinchilla, Chocolate, Himalayan, Lilac, Lynx, Marten, Opal, Otter, Red, Sable, Sable Point, Seal, Tortoise, Red-Eyed White, Blue-Eyed White, Broken (white with any accepted color), Tri-Color (white with one of the following four pairs: Black & Orange, Lilac & Fawn, Chocolate & Orange, Blue & Fawn), Pattern	Yes	Yes	United States; Texas
Mini Satin [US] Not to be confused with: Miniature Satin [UK]		4 lb (1.8 kg)	Short	Erect	Black, Blue, Broken, Chinchilla, Chocolate, Chocolate Agouti, Copper, Himalayan (includes Black, Blue, Chocolate, Lilac), Opal, Red, Siamese (includes Blue, Chocolate, Lilac), Silver Marten (includes Black, Blue, Chocolate, Lilac), Squirrel, Tortoise, White	Yes	No	United States; Ohio
Miniature Cashmere Lop; See also: Cashmere Lop		3.5 lb (1.6 kg)	Long	Lop	[same as Cashmere Lop]	No	Yes	United Kingdom; England
Miniature Lion Lop		3.3–3.5 lb (1.5–1.6 kg)	Long	Lop	Chocolate Point; Also: "Any [BRC] colour or pattern [...] apart from the broken pattern."	No	Yes	United Kingdom; England
Miniature Lop [UK/NL] Not to be confused with: Mini Lop [US] See also: Holland Lop [US]		3.4–3.8 lb (1.5–1.7 kg)	Short	Lop	"Any [BRC] colour or pattern [...] apart from the broken pattern."	No	Yes	European Union; Netherlands
Miniature Papillon; Also called: Dværgschecke [da] See also: Giant Papillon [UK]	Image	2.6–4.2 lb (1.2–1.9 kg)	Short	Erect	Black/White, Blue/White, Tri-colour (Black & Gold) [Colored butterfly, eye circles, cheek spots, ear base, saddle, side-body patches, and top of tail; all on a base of white]	No	Yes	United Kingdom; England
Miniature Satin [UK] Not to be confused with: Mini Satin [US]		4–5 lb (1.8–2.3 kg)	Short	Erect	Ivory	No	Yes	United States; Ohio
Moshtohor; Also called: Line M	Image	5.3–8.6 lb (2.40–3.91 kg)	Short	Erect	Yellowish-Brown, White, or Grey	No	No	Egypt
Netherland Dwarf		1.1–2.5 lb (0.50–1.13 kg)	Short	Erect	[Many]	Yes	Yes	European Union; Netherlands
New Zealand [US]		9–12 lb (4.1–5.4 kg)	Short	Erect	Black, Blue, Broken, Red, White	Yes	No	United States; California
New Zealand red [UK]		8 lb (3.6 kg)	Short	Erect	"Bright golden red or reddish gold with sheen"	No	Yes	United States; California
New Zealand white [UK]		9–12 lb (4.1–5.4 kg)	Short	Erect	Black, Blue, White	No	Yes	United States; California
Nitransky	Image	7.7–12.1 lb (3.5–5.5 kg)	Short	Erect	[White with diluted "Californian" markings]	No	No	European Union; Slovenia
Opossum; See also: Rex [US]	Image	6–8 lb (2.7–3.6 kg)	Rex; Curly; Long	Erect	"Any [BRC-]recognised colour."	No	Yes	Switzerland
Orange	Image	5.5–7.1 lb (2.5–3.2 kg)	Short	Erect	" A strong and warm yellow-red outer color."	No	No	European Union; Sweden
Orylag; Also called: Rex du Poitou	Image	5.5 lb (2.5 kg)	Rex; Straight; Short	Erect	[Many]	No	No	European Union; France
Ørestad	Image	5.5–7.1 lb (2.5–3.2 kg)	Short	Erect	Ruby-Eyed White	No	No	European Union; Sweden
Palomino		10–11 lb (4.5–5.0 kg)	Short	Erect	Golden, Lynx	Yes	No	United States; Washington
Pannon White	Image	5–10 lb (2.3–4.5 kg)	Short	Erect	White	No	No	European Union; Hungary
Perlfee	Image	5–8 lb (2.3–3.6 kg)	Short	Erect	"Blue Agouti"	No	Yes	United Kingdom; England
Plush Lop (Miniature); See also: Rex [US]		3.7–4.0 lb (1.7–1.8 kg)	Rex; Straight; Short	Lop	"Any colour and pattern accepted by the [BRC] apart from the broken pattern."	No	No	Australia *
Plush Lop (Standard); See also: Rex [US]	Image	5.1–5.7 lb (2.3–2.6 kg)	Rex; Straight; Short	Lop	"Any colour and pattern accepted by the [BRC] apart from the broken pattern."	No	No	Australia *
Pointed Beveren; See also: Beveren		7 lb (3.2 kg)	Short	Erect	Black, Blue, Brown, Lilac	No	Yes	European Union; Belgium
Polish [UK] See also: Britannia Petite [US]		2.5 lb (1.1 kg)	Short	Erect	[Includes >25 different colors/patterns] (Note: For the Polish [UK], the BRC recognizes seven groups of colors/patterns: Self Colours (includes Black, Blue, Brown, Lilac, White), Shaded Self Colours (includes Sable Siamese, Smoke Pearl Siamese), Agouti Patterns (includes Agouti, Chinchilla, Cinnamon, Lynx, Opal, Red Agouti, Squirrel), Tan Patterns (includes Tans, Foxes, Otter, Sable Marten, Smoke Pearl Marten), Marked (includes Himalayan), Other Colours (includes Fawn, Orange, Steel, Tortoiseshell [or Sooty Fawn]), and Any Other Variety ("To follow normal pattern.").)	No	Yes	United Kingdom; England
Polish [US]		2.5–3.5 lb (1.1–1.6 kg)	Short	Erect	Black, Blue, Blue-Eyed White, Broken, Chocolate, Red-Eyed White	Yes	No	United Kingdom; England
Rex [US] Originally called: Castorrex; Sometimes called: Standard Rex; NOTE: To see all breeds with rex fur, sort on the "Fur Type" column.		6–10.5 lb (2.7–4.8 kg)	Rex; Straight; Short	Erect	[Over 19 stated colors/patterns] (Note: For the Rex [US], ARBA recognizes the following colors: Amber, Black, Blue, Broken (includes all dual colors [any plus white], plus four tri-colors the following pair plus white]: Black & Golden Orange, Lavender Blue & Golden Fawn, dark Chocolate Brown & Golden Orange, Dove Gray & Golden Fawn), Californian, Castor, Chinchilla, Chocolate, Lilac, Lynx, Opal, Otter (includes Black Otter, Blue Otter, Chocolate Otter, Lilac Otter), Red, Sable, Seal, White.)	Yes	No	European Union; France
Rex du Poitou; See main entry: Orylag	—N/a	—N/a	—N/a	—N/a	—N/a	—N/a	—N/a	—N/a
Rhinelander; See also: Rhinsk Schecke [da]		9–10 lb (4.1–4.5 kg)	Short	Erect	White with coloured butterfly patterns	Yes	Yes	European Union; Germany
Rhone; Also called: Rhön	Image	5.5–7.1 lb (2.5–3.2 kg)	Short	Erect	"A white/black rabbit whose color/pattern is intended to resemble the surface of a birch tree."	No	No	European Union; Germany
Russian; See main entry: Himalayan	—N/a	—N/a	—N/a	—N/a	—N/a	—N/a	—N/a	—N/a
SA Phendula		8.8–11.5 lb (4.0–5.2 kg)	Short	Erect	Chestnut Agouti, Gold or Silver Tipped Steel, Black	No	No	South Africa
Sachsengold; Also called: Saxon Gold		6.1–7.2 lb (2.75–3.25 kg)	Short	Erect	Chestnut	No	No	European Union; Germany
Sallander		5–9 lb (2.3–4.1 kg)	Short	Erect	—	No	Yes	European Union; Netherlands
San Juan	Image	3–5 lb (1.4–2.3 kg)	Short	Erect	Agouti	No	No	United States; Washington
Satin [UK] See also: Miniature Satin [UK]		6–8 lb (2.7–3.6 kg)	Medium	Erect	[Includes >33 different colors/patterns] (Note: For the Satin [UK], the BRC recognizes: Argente d'Champagne, Argente Bleu, Argente Brun, Argente Crème, Beige, Black, Blue, Bronze, Brown, Castor, Chinchilla, Cinnamon, Fawn, Fox–Black, Fox–Blue, Fox–Chocolate, Fox–Lilac, Havana, Himalayan, Himalayan–Blue, Himalayan–Rex, Ivory, Lilac, Lynx, Opal, Orange, Sable (Marten), Sable (Siamese), Seal Pointed, Smoke Pearl (Marten), Smoke Pearl (Siamese), Sooty Fawn, Squirrel, [and any other BRC colour or pattern].)	No	Yes	United States; Indiana
Satin [US] See also: Mini Satin [US]		9.5–10 lb (4.3–4.5 kg)	Short	Erect	Black, Blue, Broken, Californian, Chinchilla, Chocolate, Copper, Lilac^{(under development)}, Otter, Red, Siamese, White	Yes	No	United States; Indiana
Satin Angora		6.5–9.5 lb (2.9–4.3 kg)	Long	Erect	[White or Colored]	Yes	No	Canada
Schwarzgrannen [UK]	Image	4.41–7.17 lb (2.00–3.25 kg)	Short	Erect	"[P]ure white [with] black ticking"	No	Yes	European Union; Germany
Separator [DE] See also: Beige [UK] Czech Solver [CZ]		6.6–8.3 lb (3–3.75 kg)	Short	Erect	[sandy colored]	No	No	United Kingdom
Siamese Sable		5–7 lb (2.3–3.2 kg)	Short	Erect	Light Siamese Sable, Medium Siamese Sable, Dark Siamese Sable	No	Yes	European Union; France
Siberian	Image	5–7 lb (2.3–3.2 kg)	Short	Erect	Black, Blue, Brown, Lilac	No	Yes	United Kingdom; England
Silver [UK] See also: Giant Silver		5–6 lb (2.3–2.7 kg)	Short	Erect	Blue, Brown, Fawn, Grey	No	Yes	United Kingdom; England
Silver [US] See also: Giant Silver		4–7 lb (1.8–3.2 kg)	Short	Erect	Black, Brown, Fawn	Yes	No	United Kingdom; England
Silver Fox [UK] See main entry: Fox–Silver [UK]	—N/a	—N/a	—N/a	—N/a	—N/a	—N/a	—N/a	—N/a
Silver Fox [US]		9–12 lb (4.1–5.4 kg)	Long	Erect	Black, Blue^{(under development)}, Chocolate^{(under development)}	Yes	No	United States; Ohio
Silver Marten; Also called: Beloresavec [sl] Weißgrannen [de] See also: Big Silver Marten		9.5 lb (4.3 kg)	Short	Erect	Black, Blue, Chocolate, Sable	Yes	No	European Union; France
Simenwar		2.95 lb (1.337 kg)	—N/a	—N/a	—N/a	No	No	Egypt
Slovenian Rabbit; Also called: Slovenski kunec [si]	Image	6.6–11.0 lb (3–5 kg)	Short	Erect	"Blue velvet" with "yellowish-brown" substrate and flecking. [Similar to the "St Hubert" hairshaft?] "The tail and belly are white, and the eyes are brown."	No	No	European Union; Slovenia
Smoke Pearl; Also called: Sinisoopeli [fi] Zobel blå [sv] Zobel blue [da] See also: Giant Smoke Pearl	Image	5–7 lb (2.3–3.2 kg)	Short	Erect	Marten type ["smoke in colour, shading to pearl grey beige" with certain white touches, including eye circles] or Siamese type [same but with no white touches]	No	Yes	United Kingdom; Scotland
Spanish Giant	Image	12.5–15 lb (5.7–6.8 kg)	Short	Erect	—	No	No	European Union; Spain
Squirrel	Image	5–7 lb (2.3–3.2 kg)	Short	Erect	—	No	Yes	United Kingdom; Scotland
Standard Chinchilla [US] See also: Chinchilla		5–7.5 lb (2.3–3.4 kg)	Short	Erect	Chinchilla	Yes	No	European Union; France
Standard Rex; See main entry: Rex [US]	—N/a	—N/a	—N/a	—N/a	—N/a	—N/a	—N/a	—N/a
Stone rabbit Also called: Steenkonijn [nl]	Image	6.1 lb (2.75 kg)	Short	Erect	Haaskleur ("hare" = red agouti), Konijngrijs ("rabbit grey" = grey agouti), Ijzergrauw ("iron grey" = steel agouti)	No	No	European Union; Belgium
Sussex	Image	7–8 lb (3.2–3.6 kg)	Short	Erect	[Shaded] Cream, [Shaded] Gold	No	Yes	United Kingdom; England
Swedish Fur; Also called: Svensk Pels	Image	6.6–8.2 lb (3–3.7 kg)	Short	Erect	"Glossy black with evenly spaced white hair."	No	No	European Union; Sweden
Swedish Hare; Includes the breed prev. named: Elfin		5 lb (2.3 kg)	Short	Erect	All colors and markings are acceptable	No	No	European Union; Sweden
Swiss Fox		5–8 lb (2.3–3.6 kg)	Long	Erect	—	No	Yes	Switzerland
Tadla	Image	4–5 lb (1.8–2.3 kg)	Short	Erect	Agouti	No	No	Morocco
Tan; Also called: Feu Noir [FR]		4–6 lb (1.8–2.7 kg)	Short	Erect	Black & Tan, Blue & Tan, Chocolate & Tan, Lilac & Tan	Yes	Yes	United Kingdom; England
Tax-Xiber								Malta
Teddy Dwarf; Also called: Teddyzwerg [DE]		1.8–3.7 lb (0.8–1.7 kg)	Long	Erect	[Many]	No	No	European Union; Germany
Teddy Lop; Also called: Teddywidder [DE]		2.9–4.4 lb (1.3–2.0 kg)	Long	Lop	[Many]	No	No	European Union; Germany
Thrianta		6 lb (2.7 kg)	Short	Erect	Chestnut	Yes	Yes	European Union; Netherlands
Thuringer; Also called: Thüringer		9 lb (4.1 kg)	Short	Erect	[Sable with dark points]	No	Yes	European Union; Germany
Tri-Colour Dutch; Also called: Harlequin Dutch; Japanese Dutch		4–5 lb (1.8–2.3 kg)	Short	Erect	[Tri-Colour Dutch markings] (Note: For the Tri-Colour Dutch, the BRC states: "Ideally one cheek to be orange -the other cheek black with ears black on orange side and orange on black cheek side. Blaze is white. It commences as a point starting from near the ear roots and gradually widens evenly passing between the eyes on to the neck and nape. This white must be as wide as possible. Must not pass between the ears. The saddle must make a true ring around the body and be placed 2-3 cm (3/4-1 1/4in) behind the front feet. The coloured half must be 2-3 cm (3/4-1 1/4in) banded as regularly as possible with alternating bands of black and orange. Stops an evenly cut pair, clearing the toes, and finishing no more than halfway along the foot.")	No	Yes	United Kingdom; England
Tri-Colour English		6–8 lb (2.7–3.6 kg)	Short	Erect	[Tri-Colour English markings] (Note: For the Tri-Colour English, the BRC states (in part): "Marking/Pattern to be a mixture of Black and Orange or Blue and Yellow [either combination: with White]. Each part of the marking/pattern to be bi-coloured, with the exception of the cheek spots which may be single coloured. Perfect Butterfly Smut. Circle around eyes. Cheek spots to be clear from eye circles. Unbroken Saddle, to be herring-boned and clear in any distinct colour, from base of ears to tip of tail. Body or loin markings to be broken up and not to catch the saddle. Chain markings, to be as even as possible on each side. Leg markings, one distinct spot on each leg. Ideal - The markings on both sides of the rabbit to be equally balanced. Chain markings, to commence at the base of the ears in small spots, increasing in size towards the loins.")	No	Yes	United Kingdom; England
Trønder	Image	8.8–13.2 lb (4–6 kg)	Short	Erect	"The color is shiny black with evenly distributed white hair. The white hairs are white in their full length"	No	No	Norway
V-line; Also called: Line V		7.3 lb (3.32 kg)	—N/a	—N/a	—N/a	No	No	Egypt
Velveteen Lop; See also: Rex [US]	Image	5–6.5 lb (2.3–2.9 kg)	Rex; Straight; Short	Lop	[Includes "all patterns and colors of the English Lop breed"]	No	No	United States
Vienna Coloured		7.7–11.6 lb (3.5–5.25 kg)	Medium	Erect	Agouti, Black, Blue	No	Yes	European Union; Austria
Vienna White		7.7–11.6 lb (3.5–5.25 kg)	Short	Erect	"[P]ure white [...] very lustrous"	No	Yes	European Union; Austria
Wheaten	Image	5.5–7 lb (2.5–3.2 kg)	Short	Erect	"Wheaten (the fawn or pale yellow colour of wheat)"	No	Yes	United Kingdom
Wheaten Lynx	Image	5.5–7 lb (2.5–3.2 kg)	Short	Erect	"Orange-shot-silver"	No	Yes	United Kingdom
White Country; Also called: Hvid Land [da] Hvit Land [no] Vit Lant [se]		8.4–10.1 lb (3.8–4.6 kg)	Short	Erect	Albino	No	No	European Union; Denmark
Zemmouri	Image	4.0–6.4 lb (1.8–2.9 kg)	Short	Erect	[Black with "Dutch" markings]	No	No	Morocco
Zika	Image	7.1 lb (3.2 kg)	Short	Erect	Albino	No	No	European Union; Germany

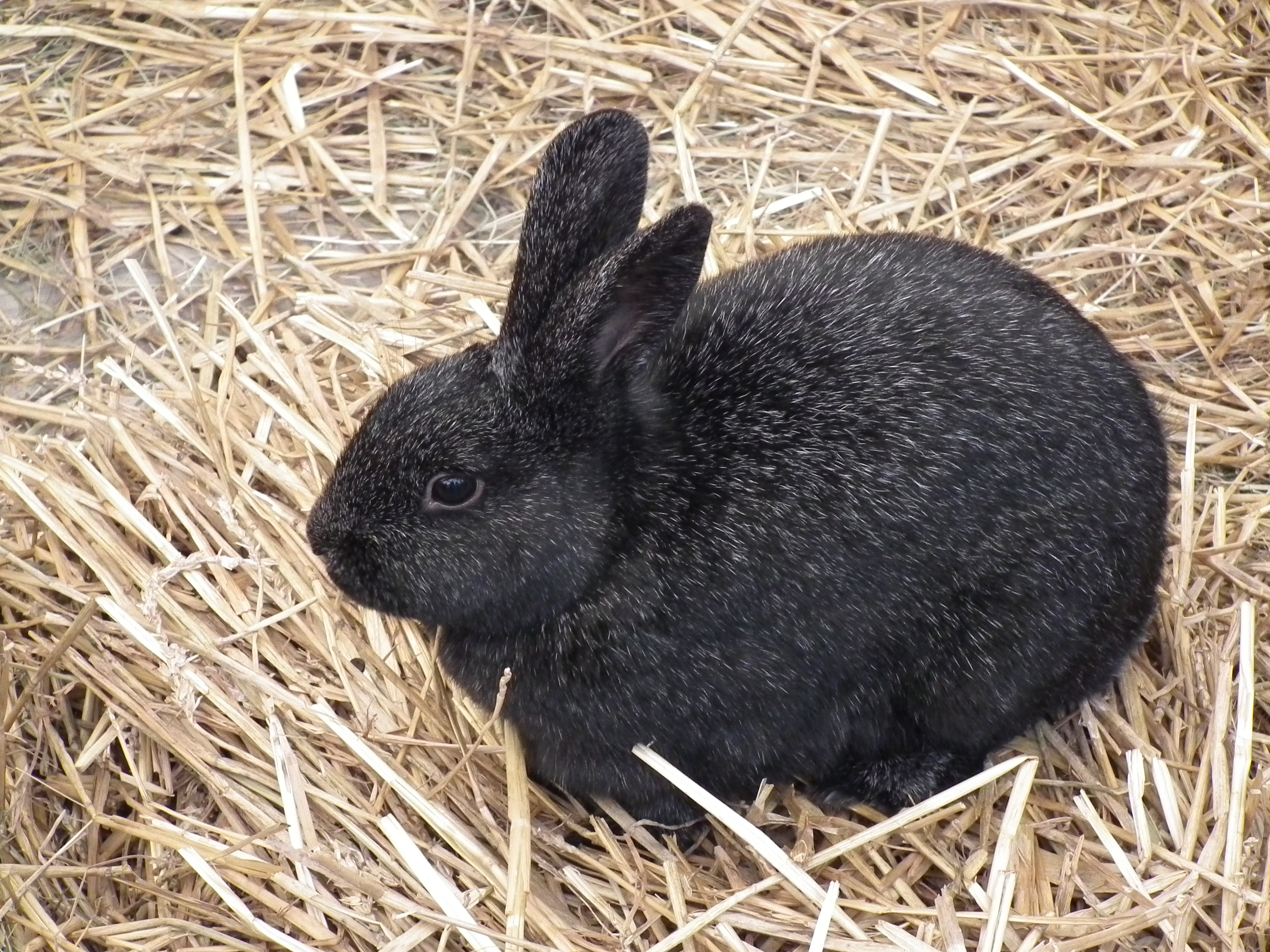

== Scope ==
The table of modern-day rabbit breeds includes those that are:

- recognized as a distinct breed by ARBA, the BRC, or another country's established organization for the national promotion of rabbit breeds,
- recognized as "in development" for potential formal recognition (as judged by multiple authoritative sources), or
- recognized as a distinct breed that resulted from natural selection (as judged by pertinent authoritative sources).

Rare breeds are denoted with pink highlighting.

== Terminology ==
Confusion sometimes arises regarding the name of a rabbit breed versus the name of a rabbit's color/pattern (or fur type). For example, Harlequin is the name of a breed whose color/pattern is known as harlequin. (This arose from the traditional Harlequin character, who, like this rabbit, always wears a motley-colored check-patterned coat and is also native to France.) The harlequin color/pattern is found now in a different breed of rabbit: the Tri-Colour Dutch, also known as the Harlequin Dutch. Such evolutions in terminology pertain also to some fur types, where (for example) the Rex breed has rex fur. There are now other rabbit breeds that also have rex fur. For example, the unusually "rexed" Astrex rabbit breed.

It is sometimes difficult to ascertain which came first, the breed name or the color/pattern name (or fur-type name). What is certain is that, in such situations, the two at some point were synonymous but subsequent developments in other breeds (likely hinging on similar genetic changes) have caused the terms to diverge.

The definition of a distinct breed relies on clusters of complex individual gene-sets—clusters that may include the gene-set for a body type, the gene-set for an ear type, the gene-set for a color/pattern, and/or the gene-set for a fur type. The determination of when a group of rabbits is considered to have become a new breed (as a result of overarching genetic distinction) is left, in the following table, to the authority of ARBA, the BRC, or other reputable source.

== Extinct rabbit breeds ==
Many rabbit breeds that are now extinct contributed to the development of a modern-day breed or breeds. An example of this was the Blue Imperial which contributed to the American and Lilac. Many rabbit breeds went extinct following the collapse of the American fur industry, though some breeds mainly raised for fur were preserved. In some cases, little is known of these nearly forgotten breeds. For some, the only records are descriptions in old breed books. At least sixty rabbit breeds have gone extinct.

Breed name	Image	Size	Fur type	Ear type	Colors & markings	Origin	Ancestor of the modern (Note: Ancestor of the modern includes notable modern-day breeds that were developed, in part, from the extinct breed.)
Beaver	—	—	—	—	Silky & luxurious coat	—	—
Blanc de Chauny	—	—	—	—	Snow white	—	—
Blanc de L'Oural	—	8–10 lb (3.6–4.5 kg)	—	—	Albino	European Union; France	—
Blue Imperial		7 lbs	Normal	Erect	Self-Blue	England	American, Lilac
Golden Fawn	—	—	—	—	—	—	New Zealand red
Old English Red	—	—	—	—	—	United Kingdom; England	—
Patagonian	—	—	—	—	—	European Union	Flemish Giant
Petite Brabancon	—	—	—	—	—	European Union; Belgium	Dutch
Rouennais	—	8–10 lb (3.6–4.5 kg)	Short	Erect	—	European Union; France	French Lop
Sitka	—	—	Long	—	—	United Kingdom; England	—
Swan	—	16–20 lb (7.3–9.1 kg)	—	—	Brown, Grey	United Kingdom; Isle of Man	—

== See also ==
- "Alba", a genetically modified "glowing" rabbit
- Animal coloration, reasons and mechanisms
- Brachycephalic, mesaticephalic, and dolichocephalic rabbit breeds
- Disruptive selection, a form of natural selection (with a rabbit example)
- Dwarf rabbit, regarding the smallest rabbit breeds
- Fur attributes in rabbits
- Genetics–Linkage maps in the domestic rabbit
- Genetics–Color genes in the domestic rabbit
- Lop rabbit, regarding ear carriage in rabbits
- Point coloration in rabbit breeds
