= Lilac rabbit =

Breed of rabbit

The Lilac rabbit is a dove-blue coloured breed of domestic rabbit. A uniform pink shade of dove is called for by the breed standard, with matching eyes. Lilacs are mid-sized, docile and hardy rabbits. Developed in Great Britain in the early 20th century, the breed spread to the United States in 1922. Population numbers remain low enough that it is currently listed by The Livestock Conservancy as a breed to watch. The Lilac breed is recognized by the British Rabbit Council (BRC) (where it is not currently considered rare) and the American Rabbit Breeders Association (ARBA).

== Description ==
The British breed standard calls for Lilac rabbits to be an "even pink shade of dove colour" over the entire body, with matching eye colour. White hairs on the body (including armpits) or toes, a blue cast to the coat, or a nose that is brown or "putty" coloured are penalized in showing. The Lilac is a mid-sized rabbit, hardy, slow-maturing and docile. At maturity, males weight 5.5 to 7.5 pounds (2.5 to 3.4 kg) and females 6 to 8 pounds (2.7 to 3.6 kg). While the does are good mothers, litter sizes are small, averaging 4 to 6 kits.

== History ==
The first breeder of lilac-colored rabbits is thought to be an H. Onslow of Cambridge, England, who began exhibiting them in London in 1913. Lilac-colored rabbits were also produced the same year by Mabel Illingworth, who crossed Blue Imperials with Havana rabbits. In 1917, a Gouda, Holland breeder named C.H. Spruty crossed Blue Beverens with Havanas to create a larger lilac rabbit called the Gouda or Gowenaar. The Cambridge Blue was created in 1922, by Cambridge University professor R.C. Punnet, by using the same cross as Spruty. The rabbits bred by Illingworth, Spruty and Punnet were merged, creating the Lilac rabbit breed. Due to the number of bloodlines within the breed and breeder preference, the exact shade of colour and size show great variety.

In 1922, the first exports were made from Britain to the US, and through 1926, many additional rabbits were sent. There was initially substantial interest in the breed in the US, especially on the west coast, but the breed never achieved the popularity that other rabbit breeds did. By 1940, Lilacs were being shown at the ARBA national show, and in 1944, the National Lilac Rabbit Club of America was formed. After this, the breed's popularity waned, and by 1951 the club, and most breeders, had become inactive. That year, only six members of the breed were shown at the national show. In 1952, the club was reorganized and restarted, and population numbers began to climb. The breed association is Great Britain is called the National Lilac Club.

Although the Livestock Conservancy currently considers the Lilac a rare breed, (placing the breed at "watch" status, meaning there is a global population of fewer than 2,000 specimens and there are fewer than 200 registrations in the US each year), the BRC does not currently include the Lilac in its "Rare Varieties Club" designation. In the 21st century, Lilacs have won Best in Show or Reserve Best in Show at numerous all-breed ARBA shows.

== See also ==
- List of rabbit breeds
