= Alaska rabbit =

Breed of rabbit

Alaska Rabbit
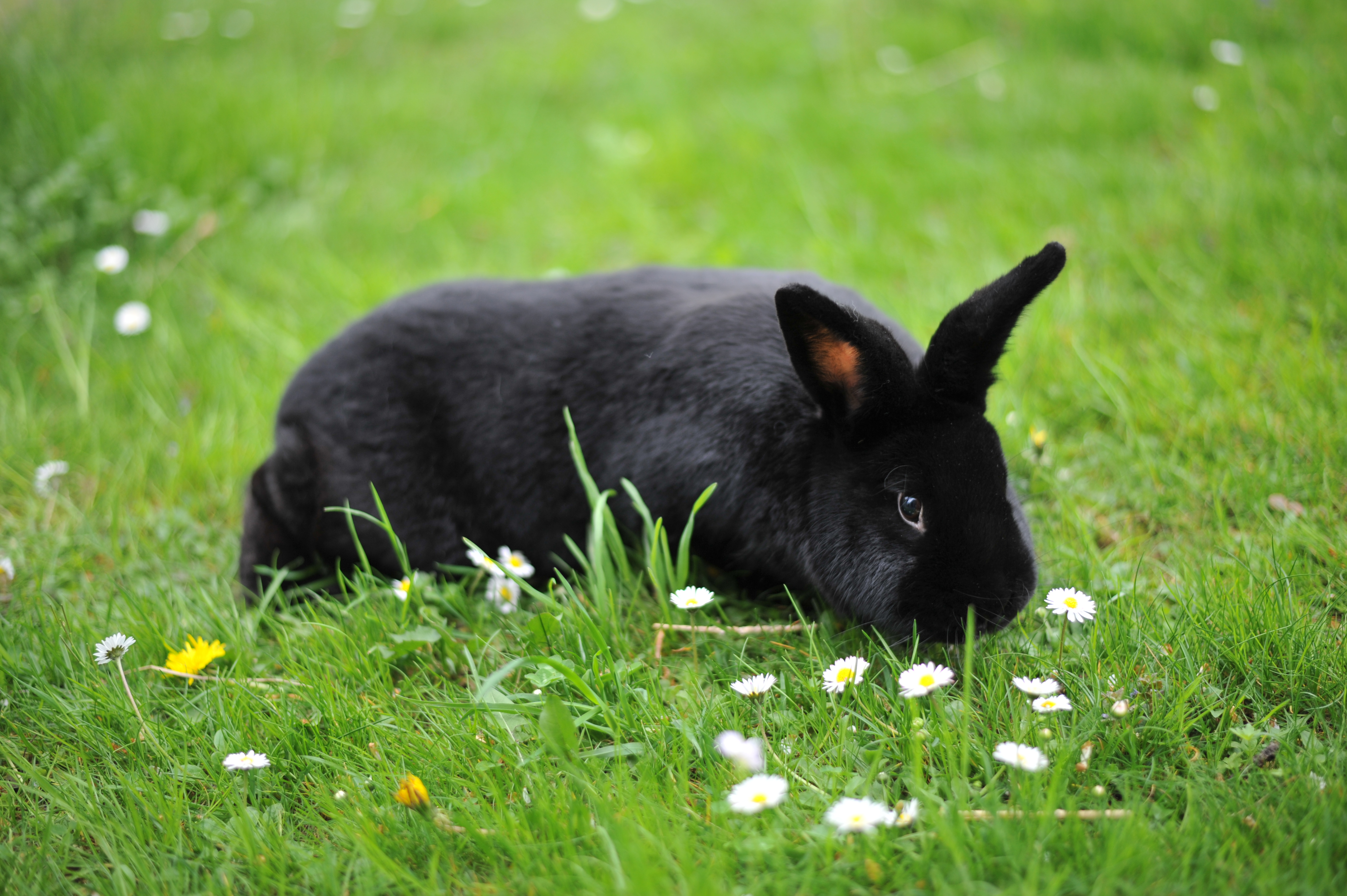
- Alaska Rabbit
- Weight: 3-4kg (7-9lbs)
- Origin: Gotha, Germany
- Created by: Max Fischer and Schmidt of Langensalza
- Created in: 1900
- Recognised mainly by: British Rabbit Council

The Alaska rabbit is a medium-sized rabbit breed, weighing around 7-9 lbs (3–4 kg) with glossy jet-black fur. Any colour other than black is a fault for this breed. Despite its name, the Alaska rabbit originates in Germany, rather than Alaska.

It is recognised by the British Rabbit Council; however it is not recognised by the American Rabbit Breeders Association.

The Alaska rabbit was created in 1900 by Max Fischer of Gotha, a rabbit judge, as well as a man named Schmidt of Langensalza. They crossed Havanas, Dutch, Himalayans and Champagne d'Argents with the goal of obtaining a rabbit that looks like the Alaska Fox, which were profitable in the fur trade of that time. They did not achieve this goal, and instead ended up with the jet-black Alaska. These Alaska rabbits, with jet-black fur were first shown in 1907, and imported to North America in the 1970s by Bert Reurs of Canada. They were added into the American Rabbit Breeders Standard, but after Black Havanas were created in the mid-1970s, interest waned and they were dropped from Standards in 1981.

The Alaska rabbit weighs 7-9 lbs. It is considered a Normal Fur breed by British Rabbit Council standards, and only comes in its standard, pitch black colour. The Alaska Rabbit Club is the British Rabbit Council's national specialty club for this breed.

== See also ==
- List of rabbit breeds
