= Blanc de Termonde =

Breed of rabbit

The Blanc de Termonde is breed of domestic rabbit that originated in Belgium It was developed from Flemish Giant and Beveren stock, originally for commercial meat production.

The Blanc de Termonde is an albino rabbit; therefore, its coat is white and its eyes are pink ("ruby-eyed white"). It weighs 4.0–5.5 kilograms (8.8–12.1 lb).

This breed is currently recognised by the British Rabbit Council (BRC), by whom it is designated as rare. This breed is not currently recognised by the American Rabbit Breeders Association. In Italy, this breed is known as the Bianco di Termonde and is considered rare.

The Blanc de Termonde's diet should consist of mostly grass hay supplemented with leafy greens and a small amount of commercial rabbit pellets.

== See also ==
- List of rabbit breeds
