= Perlfee =

Breed of rabbit

The Perlfee rabbit is a rare breed originating in Germany They are only found in blueish-grey colour, with dark, light and medium shades accepted, medium is preferred, the belly and around the eyes should be lighter in colour.

It is a recognized breed by the British Rabbit Council but not the American Rabbit Breeders Association.

== Behavior ==
Perlfee rabbits are rather docile and friendly. They are lively rabbits who make excellent pets for the beginner.

== See also ==
- List of rabbit breeds
