= Golden Glavcot =

Breed of rabbit

The Golden Glavcot is a breed of domestic rabbit recognised by the British Rabbit Council (BRC). It is a small rabbit, weighing 5–6 lb (2.3–2.7 kg), with a golden-roan coat. The BRC standard for this breed describes its color thus: "A broad band of slate, merging into brown, tipped with light roan, the whole body interspersed with dark brown, nape of neck light brown, flanks and chest ticking off to a uniform shade slightly lighter than the body, under parts of body cream/white with slate under colour."

A Silver Glavcot breed existed in the early 20th century, but it, along with the original Golden Glavcot, became extinct. The Golden Glavcot was recreated in the 1960s. Today, it is a member of the BRC's "Rare Varieties Club".

== See also ==
- List of rabbit breeds
