= Swiss Fox =

Domesticated breed of rabbit

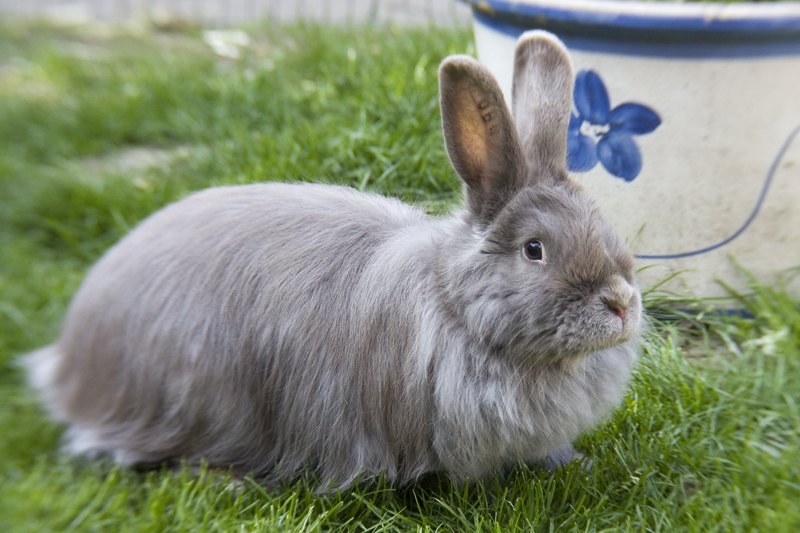
- A grey Swiss Fox rabbit
- Country of origin: Switzerland
- Distribution: Europe
- Use: Pet

Traits
- Weight: 2.5–4 kg (5 lb 8 oz – 8 lb 13 oz)
- Coat: Long, fine
- Color: Grey, White, Black, Havana or Chinchilla

The Swiss Fox is a domesticated breed of rabbit originally bred for commercial use of their fur, but now kept mainly as pets. It is a recognised breed in the UK by the British Rabbit Council as a "Normal Fur" breed, however unrecognised by the American Rabbit Breeders Association making it a rare breed in the US.

== Origin ==
The Swiss Fox rabbit was initially bred by Hermann Leifer and Müller in Switzerland in the 1920s by crossbreeding Angora and Havana rabbits in an attempt to find a cheaper alternative to Arctic fox fur. The resulting breed was not satisfactory. Despite initial low population counts due to its commercial potential failure, the breed is well known throughout Europe and is regularly shown.

== Appearance ==
The breed has a medium-sized compact body, with short necks and a partial upright posture. It has strong, upright and long (10.5–11 cm (4.1–4.3 in)) ears. Their coat is soft, long and dense and appears in mostly pastel colouring of grey, white, black, Havana and Chinchilla.

== Diet ==
Like most other rabbits, this breed should be fed a mainly fibre-rich diet, consisting mainly of vegetables and alfalfa hay.

== Behaviour ==
The Swiss Fox is a calm and affectionate breed, suitable for families with older children. The breed can be litter trained.
