= Caldes (disambiguation) =

Caldes may refer to:

== Places ==
Italy

- Caldes, comune in Trentino

Spain

- Caldes de Malavella, municipality in the comarca of Selva
- Caldes de Montbui, municipality in the comarca of Vallès Oriental
- Caldes d'Estrac, municipality in the comarca of Maresme

== Other ==
- Caldes rabbit, Spanish breed of rabbit
