= Thuringer =

A Thüringer is a person from Thuringia. It may also refer to:

- Thuringer (rabbit), a rabbit breed from Thuringia;
- Thüringer Rostbratwurst, a sausage from Thuringia
- Thuringi, the Germanic tribe namesake for Thuringia
