= Deilenaar =

Breed of rabbit

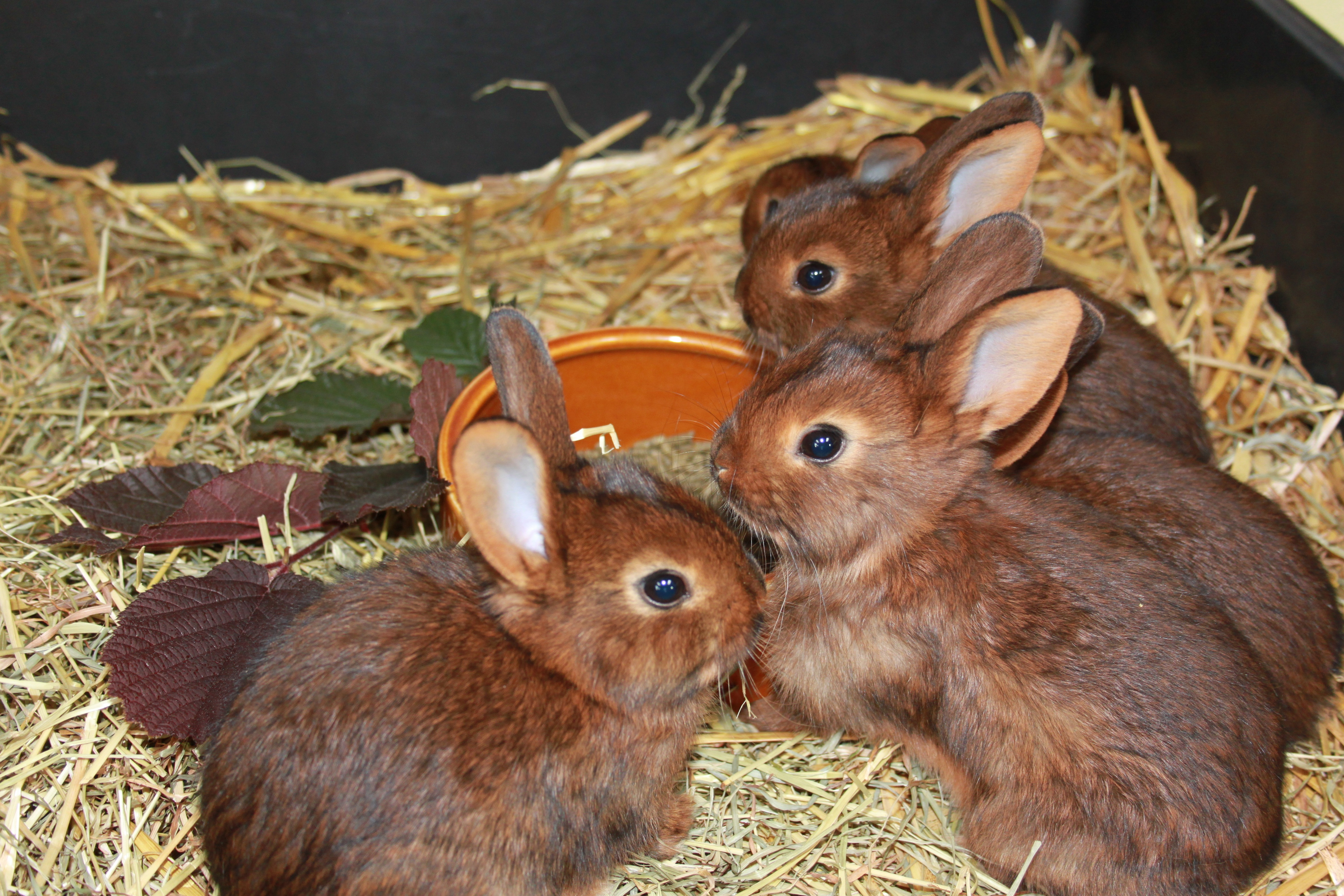
Young Deilenaar rabbits

The Deilenaar is a breed of rabbit from the Netherlands. It is a medium-sized rabbit, weighing between 5 and 7 pounds (2.3 and 3.2 kg) with chestnut red fur. It is a rare variety (Fur Section) in the UK.

It is recognised by the British Rabbit Council, but not by the American Rabbit Breeders' Association.

== See also ==
- List of rabbit breeds
