= Thrianta =

Breed of rabbit

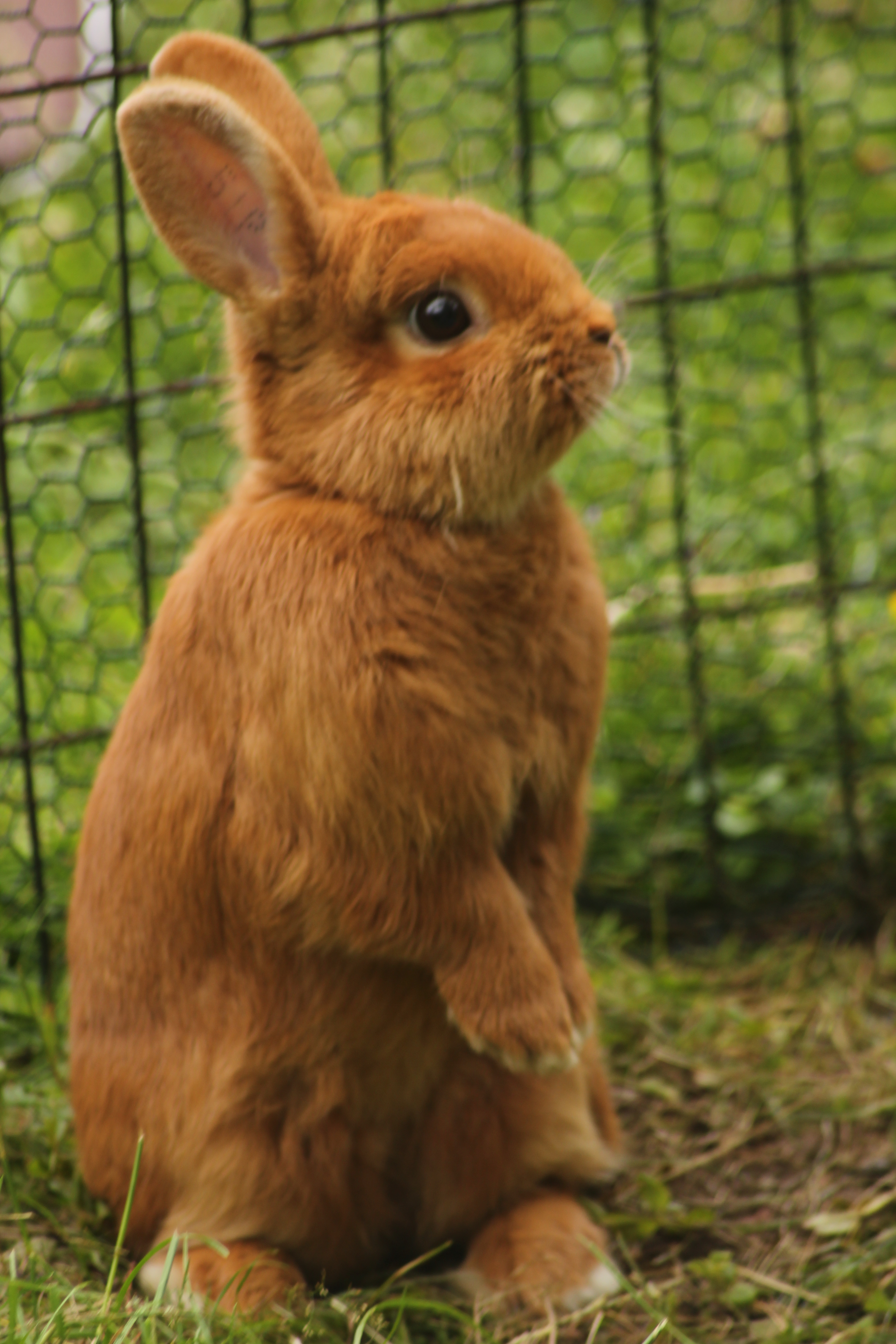
A Thrianta rabbit

The Thrianta (properly pronounced "Tree-on-tuh") is a breed of domestic rabbit that is brilliant red in color. Originating in the Netherlands, the Thrianta was further crossed with a German breed before being exported to the United Kingdom in the early 1980s. During the 1990s, the breed arrived in the United States from both the Netherlands and England. The Thrianta breed is recognized by the American Rabbit Breeders Association (ARBA) and by the British Rabbit Council (BRC). The Thrianta breed is rare in Australia with only a few active breeders.

== History ==
Thriantas originated in the Netherlands, and were created by a school teacher, Mr. H. Andreae. Mr. Andrea had been working on orange-colored rabbits since 1938, using several different breeds. Andreae was very supportive of the House of Orange-Nassau and the queen Wilhelmina. He also kept orange flowers in his front garden, in support of the royal house. On May 1, 1940, Thriantas were admitted to the Dutch standard. Days later the Nazis invaded the Netherlands. During the occupation, Andreae was ordered to remove his patriotic flowers in his front garden. He did this, but continued breeding Thriantas in symbolic defiance of the new regime.

After the war, German Sachsengold rabbits, which were nearly extinct, were smuggled out of East Germany in empty coffins during transfers of war dead. These were bred with Thriantas which were also nearly extinct. In 1980, Thriantas were imported to England and afterwards were recognized by the British Rabbit Council. Thriantas were imported into the United States in 1992 and recognized by the American Rabbit Breeders Association in 2006.

== Appearance ==
The Thrianta has a coat of scarlet and orange, similar to the color of an Irish Setter. The fur is soft, dense and medium in length. According to ARBA, Thriantas are supposed to pose short and compact, with straight ears that are red all around. The body is to be short, stocky, barrel shaped and in all areas well rounded. The legs are to be short and strong. The ideal senior weight for this compact breed is 5 to 6 pounds (2.3 to 2.7 kg).

The BRC breed standard stipulates a minimum weight of 2 kg (4.4 lb) and a maximum weight of 2.75 kg (6.1 lb).

== See also ==
- List of rabbit breeds
