= Blue of Ham =

Breed of rabbit

The Blue of Ham, also known as the Blue of Hem or Bleu de Ham, is a rare breed of domestic rabbit that originated in the Belgian village of Ham-sur-Heure in Wallonia. Developed as a meat and fur breed in 1897 by Ulysses Horemans (who introduced the breed to St. Petersburg in 1902), the once-popular Blue of Ham became rare following World War II. In 1967, a breeder named Delbusaye recreated the Blue of Ham using the Vienna breed, the Blue of Sint-Niklaas, and the Flemish Giant. Three years later, a standard for the new Blue of Ham was established, and in 1977 the breed was accepted again for exhibition. Today, the Blue of Ham is considered very rare.

This rabbit has a "long, dense, silky and lustrous" coat that is slate blue with a blue sub-color, extending as deep as possible. (The color is not as dark as the blue color variety of the Vienna breed.) The eyes are blue-grey and the ears are erect and well furred. The Blue of Ham weighs 9.9–13.2 pounds (4.5–6 kg) and is said to be "very sociable".

== See also ==
- List of rabbit breeds
