= Carmagnola (disambiguation) =

Carmagnola is a comune in the Metropolitan City of Turin, Italy.

Carmagnola (disambiguation) may also refer to:

- Francesco Bussone da Carmagnola (1382–1432), Italian condottiero
- 16106 Carmagnola, a main belt asteroid
- Gladys Carmagnola (1939–2015), Paraguayan poet and teacher
- Carmagnola Grey, a rare breed of rabbit from Italy
- Carmagnola (Venice), a Late Roman porphyry sculpture now in Venice
