= Beige rabbit =

Breed of rabbit

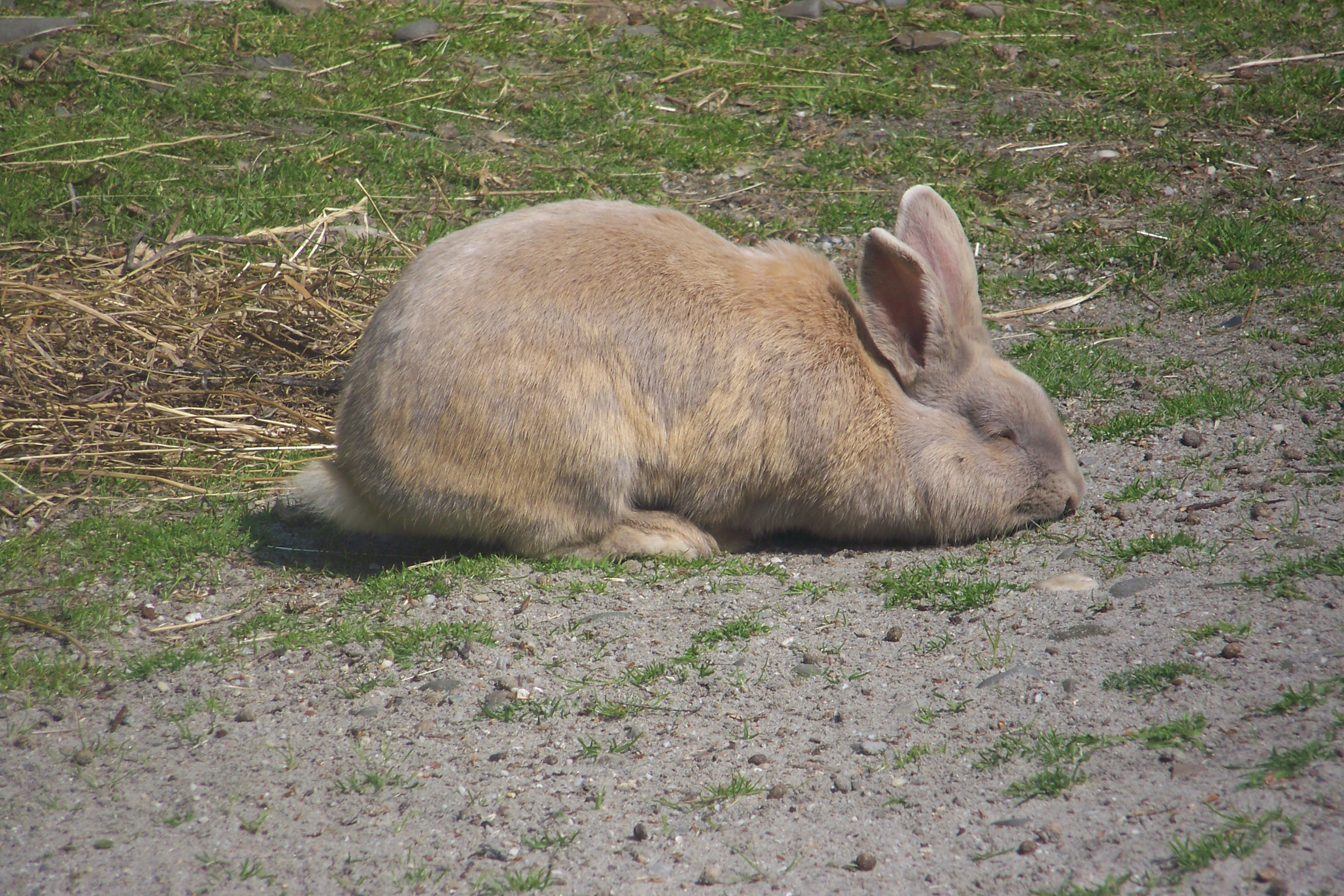

The Beige rabbit is a rare breed of rabbit. It has dense silky fur which is light-sand in colour right down to the skin, with some slate-blue ticking and shading across the body.

It is a recognised breed by the British Rabbit Council, but it is not recognised by the American Rabbit Breeders Association.

== See also ==
- List of rabbit breeds
