= Dalmatian (rabbit) =

Breed of rabbit

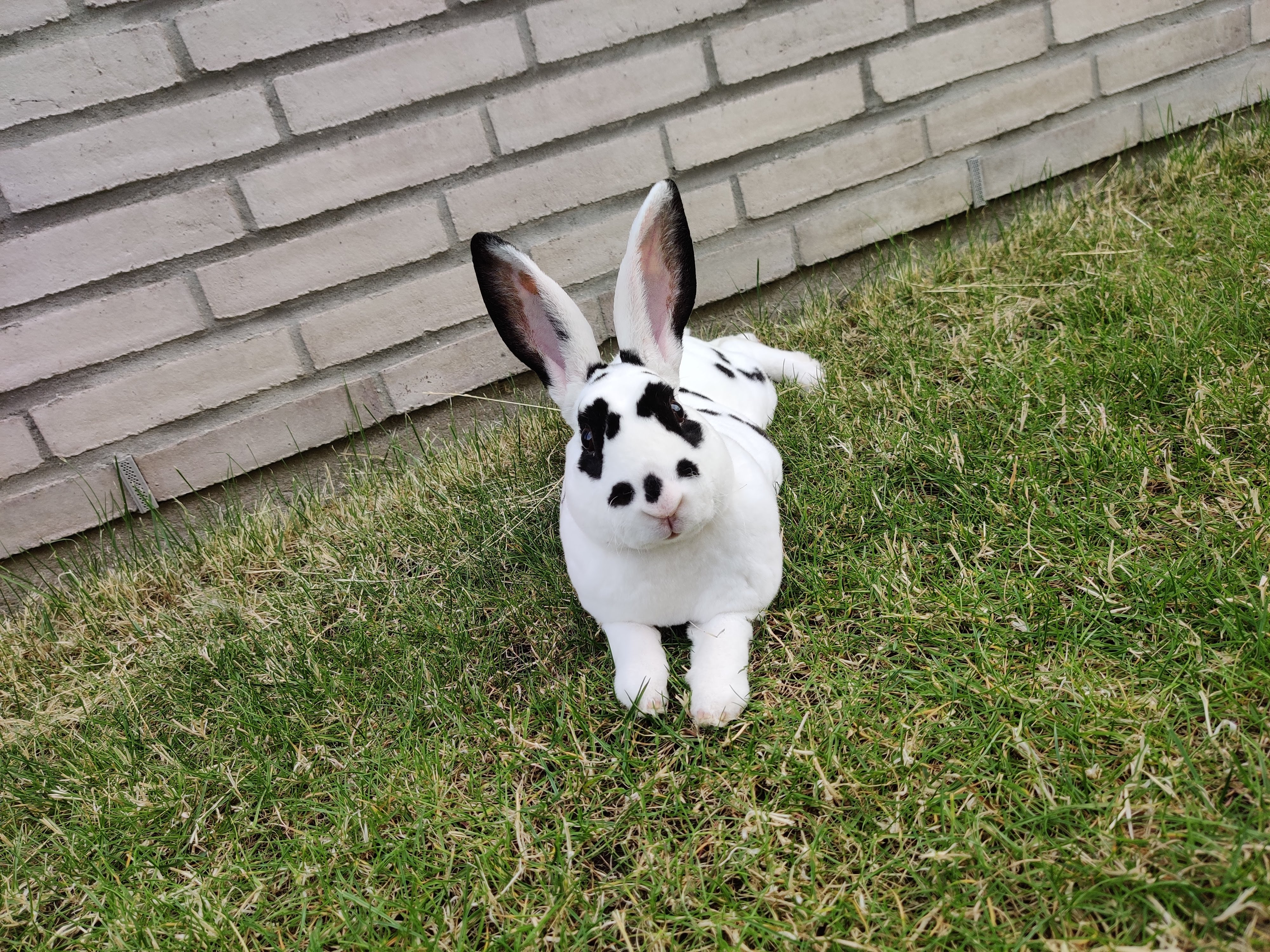

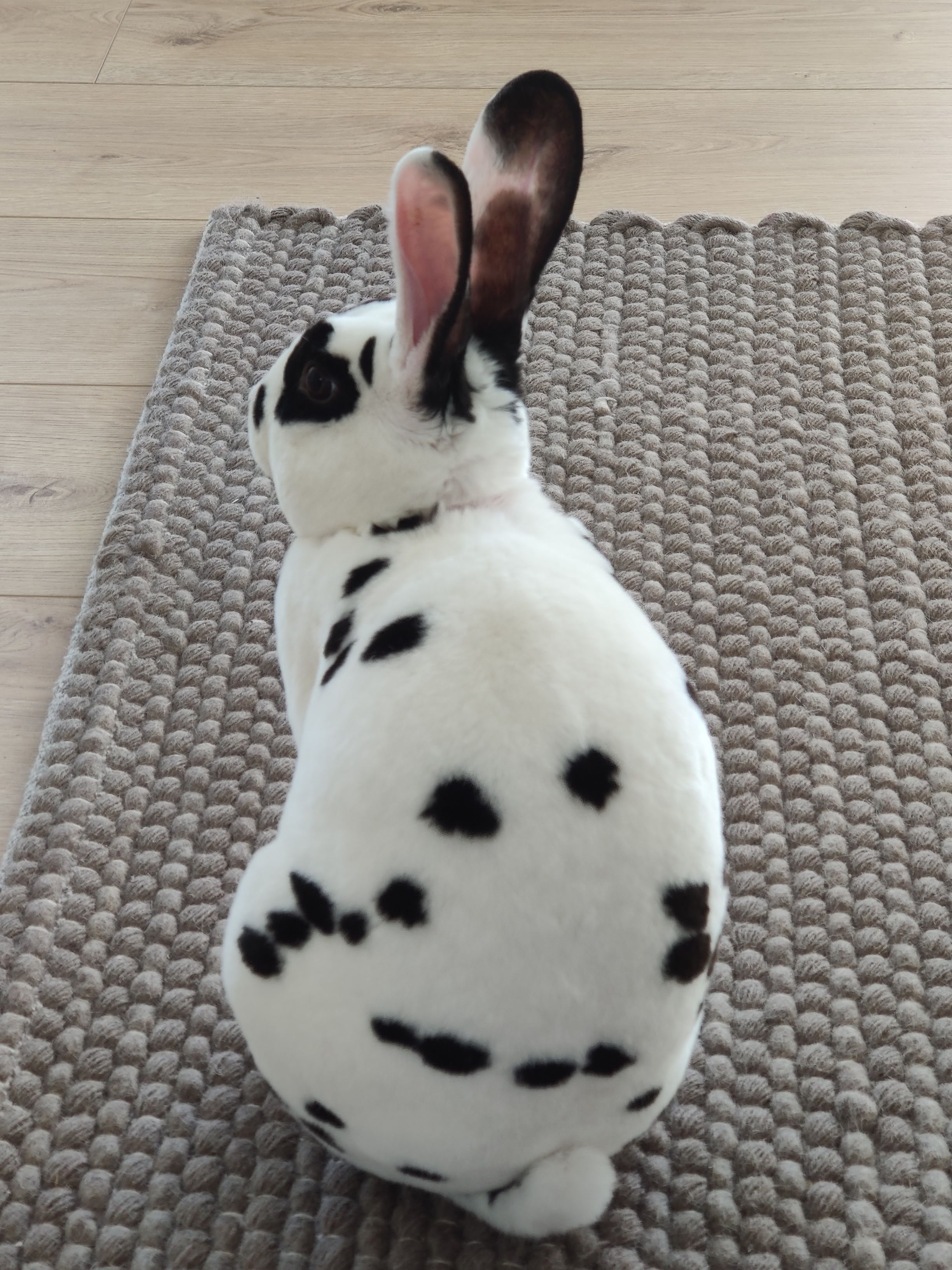

The Dalmatian rabbit, also called the Dalmatian Rex, is a medium-sized rabbit, weighing 6 to 8 pounds. Its fur is mainly white with patches of black, blue, brown, orange, or fawn.

The breed is not recognized by the American Rabbit Breeders Association, but is by the British Rabbit Council, the British Mini Rex Club, and the National Dalmatian Rex Rabbit Club.

The rabbit originates from Germany and France. Dalmatian rabbits are very active and friendly. The rabbit is rare and depleting in Europe.

== See also ==
- List of rabbit breeds
