= Cinnamon rabbit =

Breed of rabbit

The Cinnamon rabbit is a breed of domesticated rabbit created "accidentally" in 1962 and named for its coat color. The Cinnamon is currently recognized by the American Rabbit Breeders Association (ARBA) but not by the British Rabbit Council (BRC).

== History ==
The Cinnamon rabbit was created accidentally by two children, Belle and Fred Houseman, during the Easter season of 1962 in Missoula, Montana. After crossbreeding their Chinchilla doe and their New Zealand buck, the children's father, Ellis Houseman, let the children keep one crossbred buck. After joining their local 4-H group, the children were given a Checkered Giant doe and a crossed Californian doe. After mating the crossed buck with each doe, the Californian doe produced one russet-colored bunny in its litter and the Checkered Giant eventually produced two bunnies with this russet-colored fur (one doe and one buck). Ellis Houseman believed that only purebred rabbits should be kept for show, but he reluctantly allowed his children to keep the pair of russet-colored bunnies from the Checkered Giant's last litter. The children mated this pair together, and 70 percent of the litter had this new auburn shade of fur, which they began calling Cinnamon.

Ellis noticed this new color and the fur's excellent sheen, and proceeded to present the rabbits to J. Cyril Lowett, Oregon ARBA Judge and board member at the time. Lowett declared that there was a strong possibility of the rabbits' becoming an official breed, as there was no other breed like them in the United States. In order to have the breed officially recognized by the ARBA, the Housemans needed to have their rabbits "passed" by three different ARBA conventions. The Housemans first took their Cinnamons to the ARBA convention in Calgary, Canada in 1969. The Cinnamons were immediately approved, so the family sent them to the 1970 convention in Syracuse, New York. Unfortunately, the family could not attend and therefore sent the rabbits to Syracuse by air freight. During this trip the rabbits contracted a virus, leaving some sick and some dead, and they were not passed by the convention due to their poor form and condition.

In 1971, the Housemans continued their efforts for the Cinnamons to become an official breed, and the family took the rabbits to the 1971 convention in Albuquerque, New Mexico. Again there were some obstacles: the family hit a severe storm and had to abandon their trailer, and a dog broke into their rabbitry, killing three of their best does. However, the rabbits managed to pass the convention with good comments. The family finally reached their goal in 1972, when the rabbits passed their third convention in Tacoma, Washington and were officially recognized and accepted by the ARBA's Book of Standards.

== Appearance ==
Named for its distinct coloration, the Cinnamon rabbit's coat is ideally rust or ground cinnamon with a uniform gray ticking across the back, smoky grey coloring on its sides, a dark underbelly, and an orange under-color all over. Rust-colored spots appear inside the hind legs and often also on the feet and face. The hind legs, feet, and face are generally darker than the rest of the body, producing a butterfly effect on the nose and small circles around each eye. The Cinnamon, weighing 8.5–11 pounds (3.9–5.0 kg), is medium in length and has a commercial body. The hips are deeper and wider than the shoulders, the head is proportionate to the body, and the ears are erect.

The ARBA standard for the Cinnamon rabbit awards, of the total 100 points, 58 points for body type: ideally a good, medium-sized body with smooth bone structure and good filled in flesh. The overall coloring and coat quality is awarded 11 points, with another 11 points for desired markings and color variations, including varying shades of rust and brown on the body and belly, plus a lighter gray dusting along the back.

== Lifestyle and behavior ==
The Cinnamon is adapted and suitable to be kept as a pet, and is large enough for children, who are advised against keeping smaller breeds due to their delicate nature, but also advised against keeping giant breeds as they may be too large to handle.

The Cinnamon is a hardy breed—it tends to live between 5 and 8 years—and is laidback, fairly calm, well disposed, and enjoys attention. Its coat is short and easy to care for, so weekly grooming with a slicker brush should be adequate for the majority of the year. However, biweekly grooming may be necessary during the shedding season. The Cinnamon, like any breed of rabbit, will benefit from a well-balanced diet, plenty of room to exercise, various toys to chew on, and plenty of time spent with its owner.

== Uses ==
Rabbits tend to be bred for one of four things: meat, fur, show, or pet use. The Cinnamon rabbit is referred to as the "All-Purpose Rabbit", because it fulfills all four of these purposes.

=== Meat ===
Cinnamons were originally bred as meat rabbits. Of the four parent breeds of the Cinnamon, the New Zealand, Checkered Giant and Californian are largely used meat rabbits (the New Zealand is the most popular meat rabbit in the country, followed by the Californian), giving the Cinnamon a high potential as a meat rabbit as well.

=== Fur ===
Cinnamons have been bred to achieve a specific coloring, which does not vary much between rabbits of the breed. This unique and appealing color makes it an ideal fur rabbit, but because it is a rare breed it is not used often.

=== Show ===
Cinnamons have become a popular breed in competitive showing as well. Some experienced rabbit breeders enjoy the challenge of breeding the cinnamon rabbit because acquiring them is difficult due to their low numbers. However, the cinnamon is also suited for the amateur shower who is not interested in breeding. The rabbit itself is a great specimen for show because it is a commercially designed rabbit with good musculature and size.

=== Pets ===
As pets, Cinnamons are a great option. They require a balanced diet, but little grooming and care. They are large rabbits, making them too difficult for a small child to handle on their own, which keeps both the rabbit and child from injury. The Cinnamon's large size and sturdiness also allows older children to handle the breed without fear of injuring it. The naturally calm temperament of a Cinnamon suits families who are looking for a pet rabbit, as the breed enjoys human attention.

== See also ==
- Domestic rabbit
- List of rabbit breeds
