= Baladi rabbit =

Breed of rabbit

The Baladi rabbit is an Egyptian rabbit that has been bred to cope with the Egyptian climate. It is used primarily for meat production, much like the Bauscat rabbit.

Baladi rabbits come in three coat colors: black, red, or white. These rabbits weigh approximately 2.7 kg (6 lb) and a typical litter consists of 5-6 kits.

Their head is convex, eyes are black, ears are erect, feet and legs are medium in length, and their tails are short and straight. Baladi rabbits are docile and are adjusted to hot climates. They live in valleys that are about 15° to 35 °C and about 25 to 75% relative humidity.

The Baladi Black rabbit weights 6 pounds. The Baladi Red rabbit weights 6.2 pounds. The Baladi White rabbit weights 4.3 pounds. All the rabbits have short fur and erect style ears. They are not recognized by the American Rabbit Breeders Association or the British Rabbit Council.

== See also ==
- List of rabbit breeds
