= Blanc de Bouscat =

Breed of rabbit

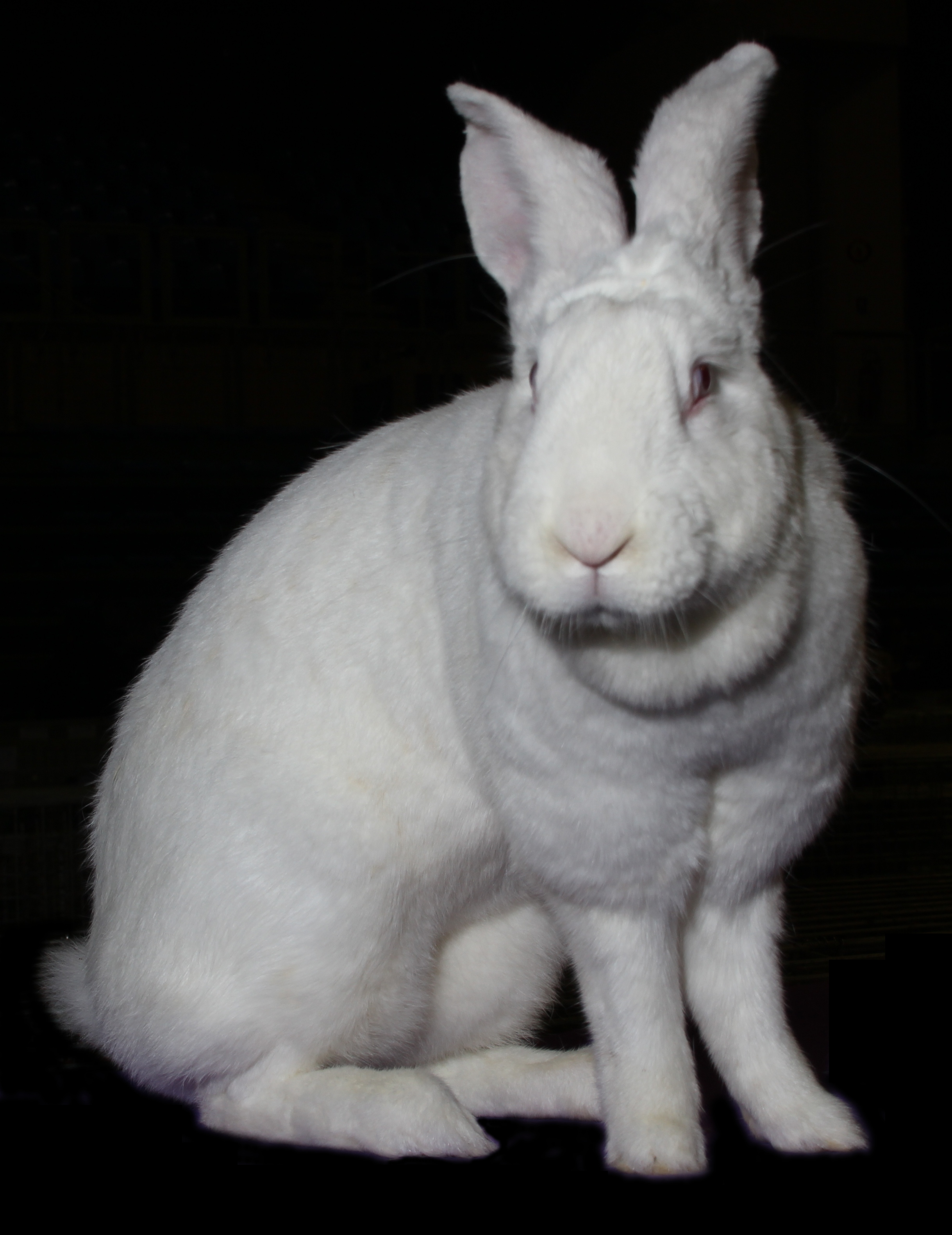
Blanc de Bouscat female

The Blanc de Bouscat is a large white rabbit originally bred in France in 1906, with Argente Champagne, French Angora and Flemish Giant in its heritage. It is very rare in the UK and considered a breed at risk in France.

It is a recognised breed by the British Rabbit Council, it is not recognised by the American Rabbit Breeders Association.

== See also ==
- List of rabbit breeds
