= Blanc de Popielno =

Breed of rabbit

The Blanc de Popielno (Literally "White of Popielno"), also known as the Popielno White or the Popielański Biały, is a breed of domestic rabbit developed for meat production. Originating in 1950 in Chorzelów, the breed was further refined in the Polish village of Popielno. It is an albino rabbit with an average weight of 8.8–11.0 pounds (4–5 kg).

== See also ==
- List of rabbit breeds
