= Brazilian domestic rabbit =

Breed of rabbit

Brazilian domestic rabbit is a medium-sized hardy breed originated in Brazil. They were developed as a meat breed.

The breed is not current recognized by the American Rabbit Breeders Association or the British Rabbit council.

The Brazilian Domestic rabbit was also one of many breeds included in the Federal University of Rio Grande Sul FaVet’s 2017 study into Toxoplasmosis, more specifically in creating an initial report in how the Brill Toxoplasma Gondii genotype would impact affected tissues and immunities. This study succeeded in identifying the specific gene involved in T. gondii Brill and in reporting and quantizing the diversity of the Disease in Brazil.

== See also ==
- List of rabbit breeds
