= Bauscat rabbit =

Breed of rabbit

The Bauscat rabbit is an Egyptian breed bred to cope with the Egyptian climate. It is a medium-sized breed intended for meat production. It is similar to another Egyptian breed, the Baladi rabbit.

== See also ==
- List of rabbit breeds
