= Thuringer (rabbit) =

Breed of rabbit

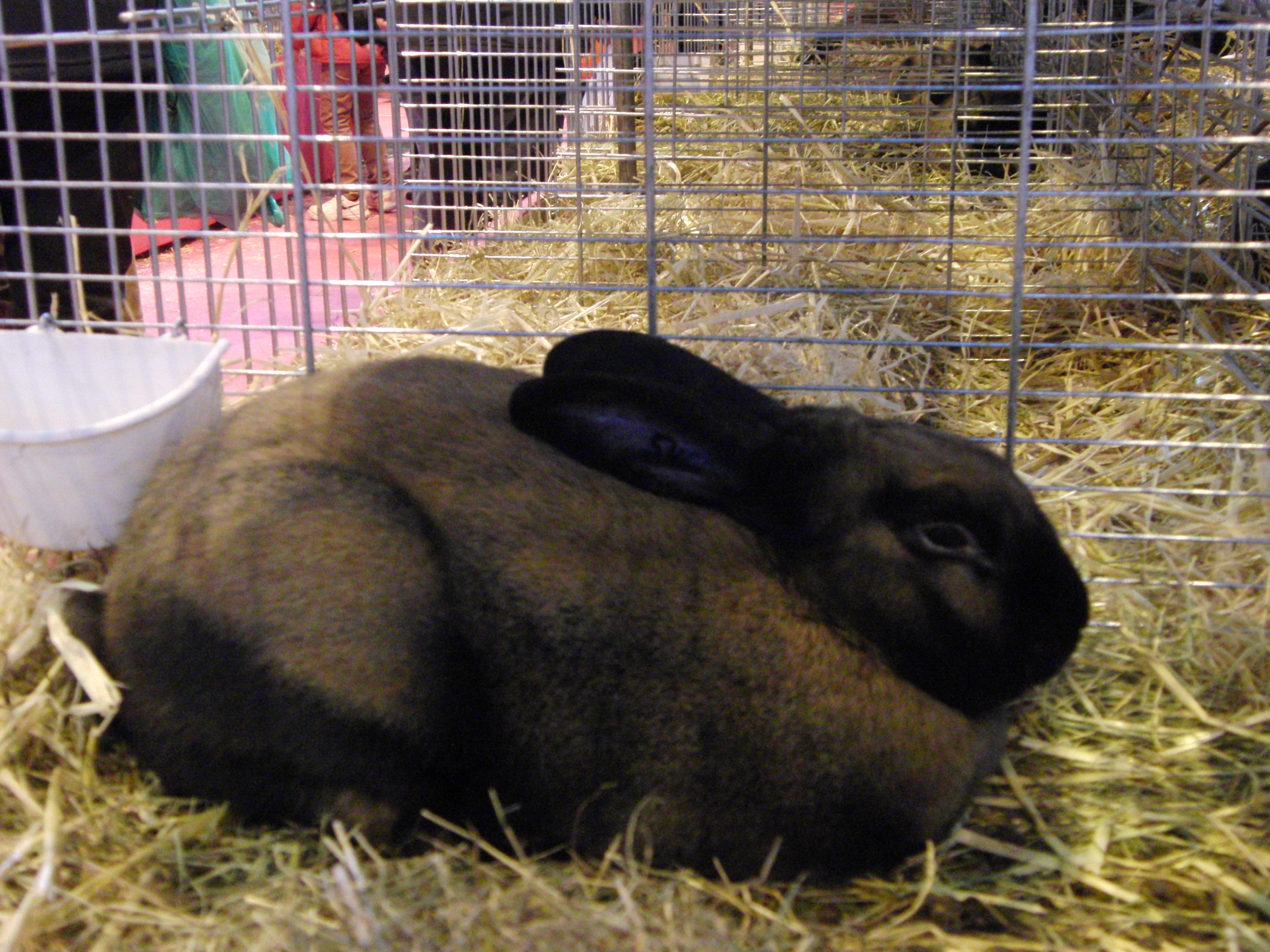
- Country of origin: Germany
- Use: Meat, fur

Traits
- Weight: 2.5-4.25 kg (for show rabbits)

The Thuringer is a breed of rabbit. It was originally known as the Thuringer Chamois due to having fur resembling that of the Chamois. They can be used for meat and fur, but make docile pets.

== History ==
The Thuringer was developed in the state of Thuringia by David Gärtner, and is thought to be a mix of the Himalayan, the Silver, and the Flemish Giant rabbit breeds. It was first recognised in Germany in 1907, and was later recognised in the Netherlands in 1912. The breed is somewhat rare outside of Europe. It is recognised by the British Rabbit Council but is not currently recognised by the ARBA.

== Appearance ==
The Thuringer has a well rounded body, with the head set close to it. The muzzle is broad. Furred and well-developed ears of 11–13 cm (4-5 inches) in length. The eye is a chestnut or dark brown colour. Show rabbits have a well developed chest and shoulders. Feet and legs are of medium length. Fur is dense and silky, of medium length and feels soft when touched. The colour is of a yellow ochre or resembling chamois leather. Guard hairs are a bluish black colour, which is said by the breed standard to 'produce a haze of pale charcoal colour'.
