= Liptov Baldspotted rabbit =

Breed of rabbit

The Liptov Baldspotted Rabbit (Slovak: Liptovský lysko) is a Slovak breed of domestic rabbit. It was officially recognized in 2005. It weighs approximately 4–4.25 kilograms (8.8–9.4 lb). There are three colour varieties: agouti, blue-agouti, and black. The pattern on the head is a white blaze (similar to "Dutch" head markings), but there are no other white markings anywhere on the rabbit. It has been bred in the Liptov region of Slovakia.

== See also ==
- List of rabbit breeds
