= Blue of Sint-Niklaas =

Flemish rabbit breed

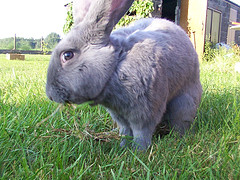
Blue of Sint-Niklaas, buck

The Blue of Sint-Niklaas (Dutch: Sint-Niklase Blauwe) is a Flemish rabbit breed first produced in the 19th century near the city of Sint-Niklaas to supply the local fur industry. It is one of the oldest fur-rabbit breeds of the world. The Van Beveren, also bred for its fur, is related, and has been bred in the same region of Flanders, the Waasland.

Internationally, only blue varieties are accepted by the standard, unlike the Van Beverens, where other varieties are accepted. The Blue of Sint-Niklaas is much heavier, up to 12 lb (5.4 kg), indicating resemblance to the Flemish Giant.

After the decrease of pelt-selling and fur industries in the region (and the world) the breed became almost extinct, as it was not popular as a pet or for meat. Only a few European breeders in Belgium and France are left.

== See also ==
- List of rabbit breeds
