= Silver Fox rabbit =

Breed of domestic rabbit

Silver Fox
- A Silver Fox doe (female rabbit)
- Other names: American Heavyweight Silver; American Silver Fox
- Country of origin: United States

Traits
- Weight: Male: 9–11 lb; Female: 10–12 lb
- Fur type: Standing

Classification
- ARBA recognized: Yes
- ARBA type: Commercial
- ARBA class: 6
- Show classes: Junior buck; Junior doe; Intermediate buck; Intermediate doe; Senior buck; Senior doe

The Silver Fox rabbit is a rare breed of domestic rabbit developed by Walter B. Garland of North Canton, Ohio, and bred for meat, show, and its unique fur. The breed is recognized by the American Rabbit Breeders Association.

== History ==
The Silver Fox breed was developed by Walter B. Garland of North Canton, Ohio and was the third breed to be developed in the United States. The breeds used to develop the Silver Fox are still disputed. However, it is believed that Checkered Giants and Champagnes were used. In 1925, the breed was accepted by the American Rabbit Breeders Association (ARBA) at the Colorado Springs convention in both blue and black varieties. The Silver Fox was originally named the "American Heavyweight Silver", but the name was changed to Silver Fox in 1929. Due to low numbers shown at ARBA national conventions, the blue variety was dropped from the standard in the 1990s so that only the black varieties can be shown (none exhibition). Today the Silver Fox is rebounding in popularity due to an increased interest in its fur and meat production. However, the Silver Fox is still considered threatened by the American Livestock Breeds Conservancy. The Silver Fox is also recognized by Slow Food USA's Ark of Taste, a catalog of U.S. foods in danger of extinction.

== Appearance and personality ==
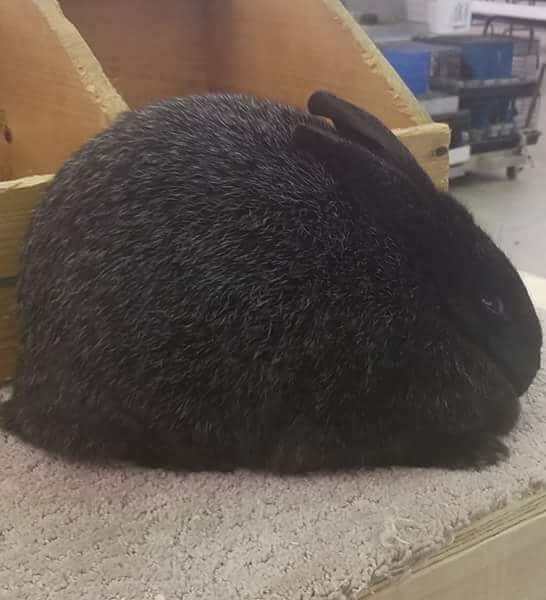
A large Silver Fox doe

The Silver Fox is a large, docile breed that is excellent with children. Senior bucks should weigh 9–11 pounds and senior does should weigh 10–12 pounds. The breed is named for its dense, unique fur which is to closely resembles the pelt of the silver fox. The fur of the Silver Fox rabbit is unique in that it is classified as "stand up" fur; it stands on end until stroked back into place. The Silver Fox is the only breed accepted by ARBA that has stand up fur; by ARBA standard the fur is ideally 1.5 inches (3.8 cm) in length.

The Silver Fox breed is classified as "Commercial" by ARBA. This means that the ideal shape of the Silver Fox is to provide the maximum amount of meat in the prime cuts of the carcass. Well-filled, wide, straight hindquarters; a deep profile which allows for a deep loin; body width equal to the depth of the hindquarters; and a short shoulder all are ideal components of any commercial breed, including the Silver Fox.

Currently, only black and chocolate Silver Foxes can be shown to win best of breed, but the breed comes in a variety of colors, such as blue, lilac, and white, which can be shown with permission from the show runners and with a working standard. Chocolate was recently accepted as an official variety as of the 2021 ARBA convention. As of December of 2021 they can be shown against black Silver Fox and win best of breed and best opposite sex. Blue was previously included in the breed standard, but was removed in the 1970s due to a decrease in the number of blue Silver Fox rabbits being shown. Currently, there is a "Certificate of Development" for blue Silver Foxes to be re-accepted into the ARBA. Blue silver fox can be shown in ARBA recognized shows for exhibition. Though rare, there are tortoise shell colored silver foxes, which are being used to recreate the now extinct breed known as the Alaskan Red Fox. It is unknown if the Alaskan Red Fox will be a proposed variety for the silver fox or a different breed entirely.

Silver Foxes are known to be friendly, enjoying attention and handling.

== See also ==
- List of rabbit breeds
- Fox (rabbit)
