= Hulstlander =

Breed of rabbit

The Hulstlander is a small/medium breed of rabbit only recognised in white with pale blue eyes. Any other colour is a fault.

== See also ==
- List of rabbit breeds
