= Bourbonnais Grey =

Breed of rabbit

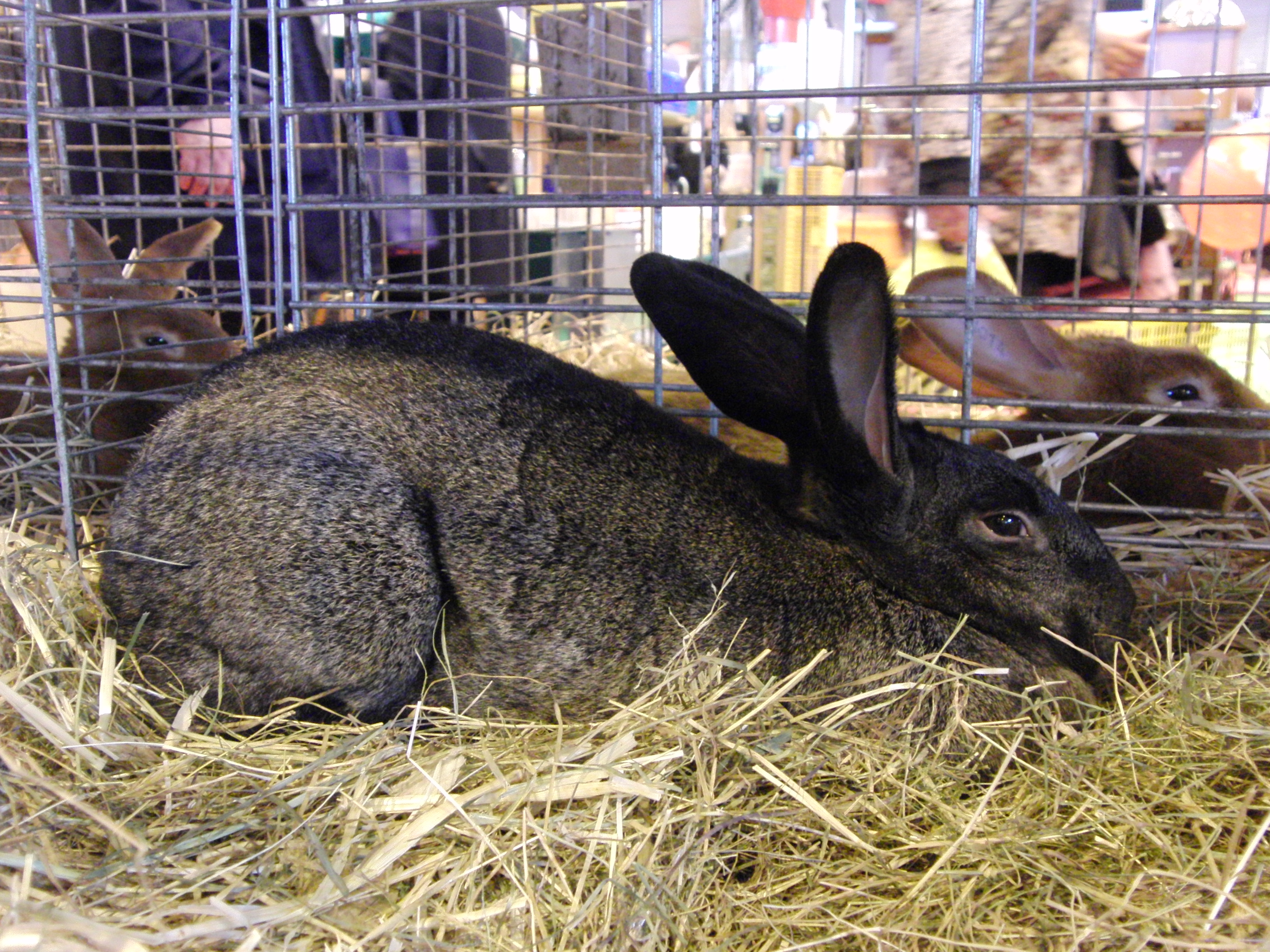
Bourbonnais Grey

The Bourbonnais Grey is a rare breed rabbit originally from France. It is a medium, exclusively slate-blue breed reaching around 4–5 kg (11 lb).

== See also ==
- List of rabbit breeds
