= Gabali rabbit =

Breed of rabbit

The Gabali is a rare rabbit breed which originates in Egypt. It is primarily agouti in colour and was bred as a meat breed by the Bedouins.

== See also ==
- List of rabbit breeds
