= Chaudry rabbit =

Breed of rabbit

The Chaudry is an albino breed of domestic rabbit that originated in France and was developed for meat production. The Chaudry, which has a minimum weight of 8.8 pounds (4 kg), was created "by combining every pure albino rabbit [breed] known in France".

== See also ==
- List of rabbit breeds
