= Fauve de Bourgogne =

Breed of rabbit

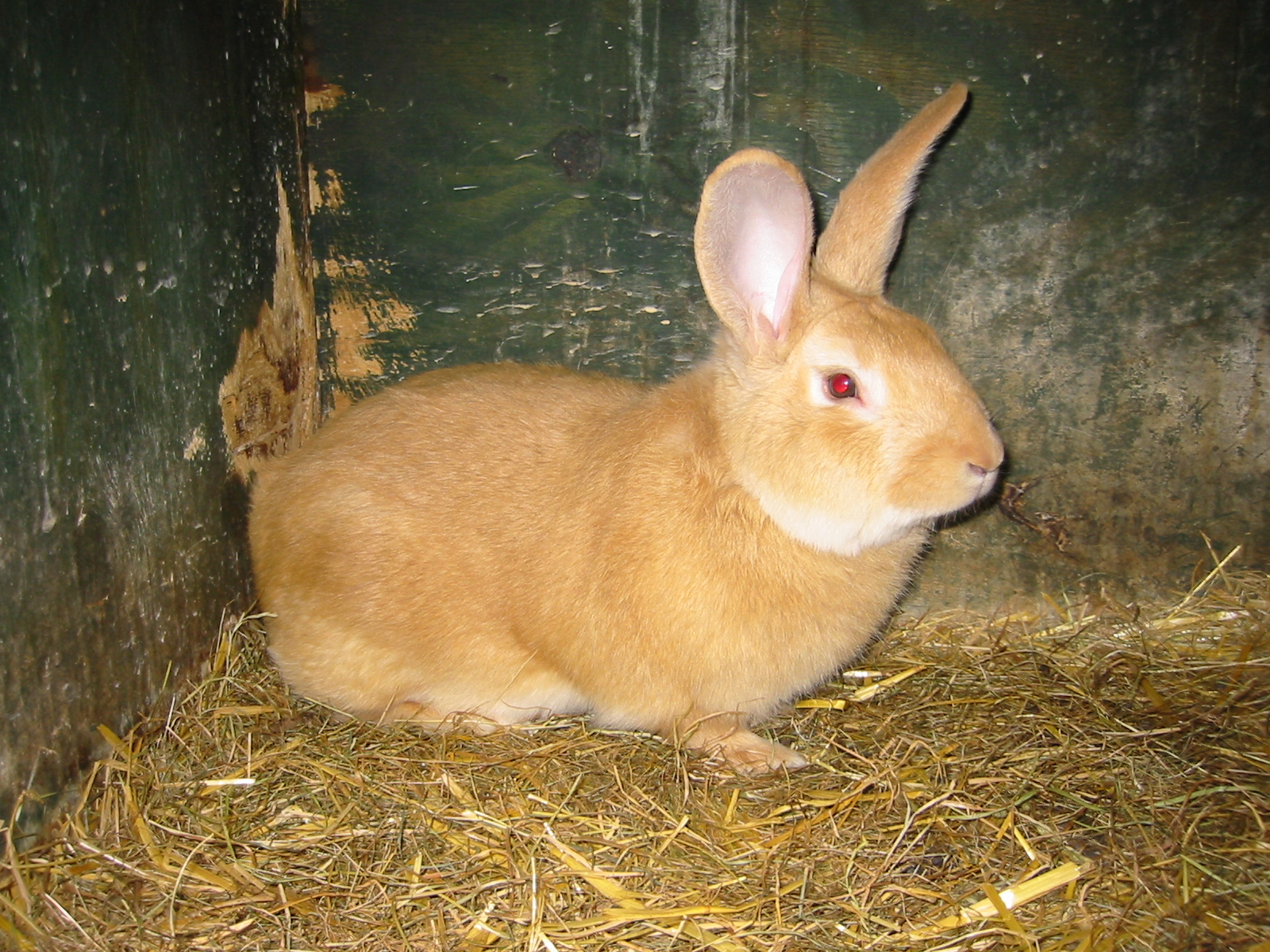

The Fauve de Bourgogne is a stocky medium-sized breed of rabbit which is orange-red in color.

== See also ==
- List of rabbit breeds
