= American Sable rabbit =

Breed of rabbit

American Sable
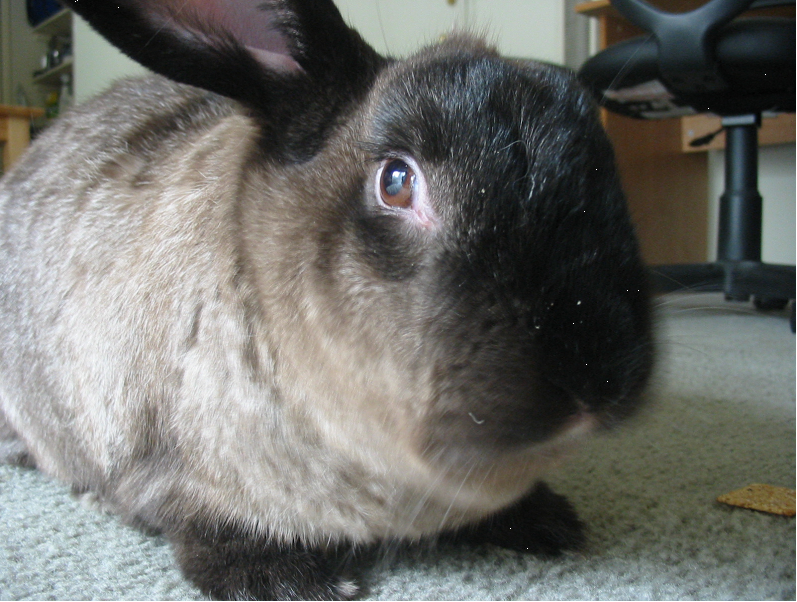
- An American Sable rabbit
- https://www.arba.net/

The American Sable is a rabbit breed recognized by the American Rabbit Breeders Association (ARBA). The American Sable rabbit breed can trace its roots to colored throwbacks from purebred Chinchilla rabbits belonging to Otto Brock of San Gabriel, California, in 1924.

== Appearance ==
The American Sable is a result of Chinchilla rabbit crosses. Sables are identical to Chinchilla rabbits in body conformation, but their coats are colored differently. The head, feet, ears, back, and top of the tail are a dark sepia, while the coat fades to a lighter tan over the rest of the body, similar to the coloring of a Siamese cat. The breed's eyes are usually dark with a ruby hue.

Typically their weight can reach 7–10 pounds (3.2–4.5 kg), with bucks weighing 7–9 pounds (3.2–4.1 kg) and does weighing 8–10 pounds (3.6–4.5 kg). Their body type is commercial, medium in length, long, and wide.

== Demeanor ==
The American Sable enjoys the company of other rabbits. It is generally docile, spending most of the day sleeping. Typically, they enjoy the companionship of their owner, but on their own terms. When distressed, the American Sable will make a grunting noise or will, like many other breeds, thump its back foot on the ground in an attempt to scare whatever it is that is bothering them.

== Conservation ==
Some decades after the introduction of the American Sable breed, in the 1970s, the population of the breed began to decline. Several breeders with a distinct interest in the breed, some of which call themselves "sablers", formed the American Sable Rabbit Society (ASRS) in Cedar Rapids, Iowa in 1982 through the efforts of Al Roerdanz of Kingsville, Ohio, which saved the breed from extinction. As of 2019, the ASRS continued to promote the American Sable breed and maintains its Standard of Perfection as required under ARBA rules, though its website has been abandoned since 2020.

As of 2019, the population in the United States is over a thousand individuals, and the breed is not of concern for conservation.

== See also ==
- List of rabbit breeds
