= Silver rabbit =

Breed of domestic rabbit

Silver
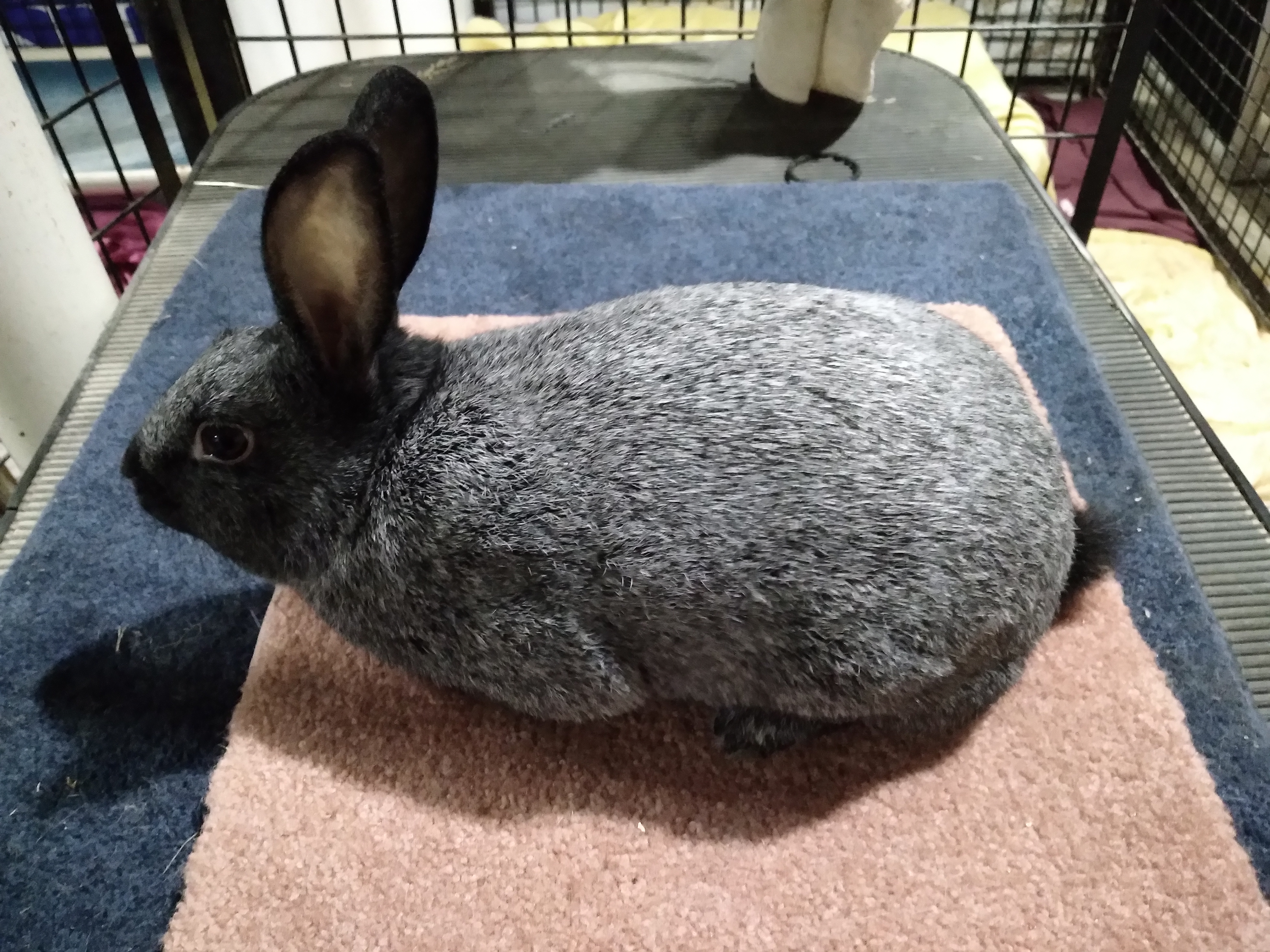
- A Black Silver Buck (male rabbit)
- Conservation status: Threatened

Traits
- Weight: Male: 4–7 lb; Female: 4–7 lb
- Fur type: Flyback

Classification
- ARBA recognized: Yes
- ARBA class: 4
- Show classes: Junior buck; Junior doe; Senior buck; Senior doe

The Silver rabbit is a rare breed of domestic rabbit believed to be brought to England by Sir Walter Raleigh in 1592. The breed has been bred for meat, show, and its pelt ever since and is recognized by the American Rabbit Breeders Association (ARBA).

== History ==
Although the origins of the breed are unknown, Silvers are thought to be a mutation of the European wild rabbit. The breed was first discovered and brought to Europe in the early 1500s. The Silver rapidly spread across Europe and Asia; it is said that Sir Walter Raleigh introduced the rabbits to warrens in England. Later in the 1900s, the breed was brought to the United States of America. The Silver was then one of the first breeds to be accepted by ARBA in 1920. However, over time, more efficient meat rabbits were developed. This development caused the Silver to lose popularity, resulting in an extremely rare and critically endangered breed.

== Appearance and personality ==
The Silver is a medium-sized breed. Senior bucks and does should weigh 4–7 pounds. The breed is named for its unique fur whose guard hairs are silver-colored. The fur of the Silver rabbit is flyback: when stroked the opposite way of the fur, the fur "flies back" into position. The Silver is one of the many breeds accepted by ARBA that has flyback fur.

The Silver is classified as "compact" by ARBA.

Currently, black, brown, and fawn Silvers can be shown to win best of breed in the United States of America, but the breed also comes in a variety of other colors, such as blue and tortoise. The blue color had a "Certificate of Development" in the United States of America for a short period of time, but is no longer in effect. The "Certificate of Development" allowed the blue to be shown with permission from the show organizers and with a working standard. By contrast, gray (black), brown, fawn, and blue can be shown in the United Kingdom. The three recognized colors in the US are the same as they were nearly a century ago.

Silvers are known to be friendly and energetic.

== See also ==
- List of rabbit breeds
