= Carmagnola Grey =

Breed of rabbit

The Carmagnola Grey rabbit is a rare breed from Italy, almost extinct. It is a large chinchilla-colored breed bred for meat. The coat of the Carmagnola Grey exhibits chinchilla coloration. The average weight of an adult Carmagnola Grey is 7.7–9.9 pounds (3.5–4.5 kg). Fewer than 500 specimens were found in a 2002 population study.

== Diet ==
One of Carnmagnola's grey rabbits' diets consisted of perilla seeds (Perilla frutescens L.). Perilla seeds are considered as a supplement in their diet as it enhances with growth, development, and meat quality.

== See also ==
- List of rabbit breeds
