= Zika rabbit =

Breed of rabbit

Zika is a breed of domestic rabbit developed in Germany as a high-yielding hybrid for the meat industry. Zikas are albino rabbits (white with red eyes) that attain a weight of 7.1 pounds (3.2 kg) in 84 days.
