= Caldes rabbit =

Breed of rabbit

The Caldes rabbit is a Spanish breed of rabbit. It is a terminal sire used to cross breed with other rabbits for meat. They are primarily found in albino.

== See also ==
- List of rabbit breeds
