= Beveren rabbit =

Breed of rabbit

The Beveren is one of the oldest and largest breeds of fur rabbits. It was first bred in Beveren, a small town near Antwerp in Belgium. Their coats can be blue, white, black and lilac, though not all of these varieties are recognized by the American Rabbit Breeders Association (ARBA). There is a rare variety called the Pointed Beveren, which comes in the same colors but has white tipped hairs. The blue variety is the original.

The Beveren rabbit is a rare breed. They are well tempered, clean, and smart. Beverens are full of energy, and love to explore the outdoors. They are recognized by the ARBA in three different colors, Black, Blue, and White. The coat should be dense and glossy with a gentle rollback fur type. Fur length is rather long having an average of 1 1/4 to 1 1/2 inches. This large breed has a pronounced mandolin shape. Senior Bucks weight 8 to 11 pounds and Senior Does weight 9 to 12 pounds (American Rabbit Breeders Association (2016) Standard of Perfection. Bloomington, Il: Author). Their litters are large, the young grow fairly fast, and the does are typically docile and make good mothers.

== Competition ==
=== Schedule of points ===
GENERAL TYPE: 55 points Body: 30 points Head: 10 points Ears: 5 points Feet & Legs: 5 points FUR: 20 points COLOR: 20 points CONDITION: 5 points TOTAL POINTS: 150 points

=== Show classes and weights ===
- Senior Bucks - 8 months of age and over, weight 8 to 11 lbs. Ideal weight 10 lbs. (≈4.5 kg)
- Senior Does - 8 months of age and over, weight 9 to 12 lbs. Ideal weight 11 lbs. (≈5 kg)
- Intermediate Bucks - 6 to 8 months of age, not over 9 1/2 lbs. (≈4.3 kg)
- Intermediate Does - 6 to 8 months of age, not over 10 1/2 lbs. (≈4.8 kg)
- Junior Bucks - Under 6 months of age, not over 8 lbs. (≈4.5 kg)
- Junior Does - Under 6 months of age, not over 9 lbs. (≈4.1 kg)
- Pre-Jr. Bucks and Does - Under 3 months of age. Not over 5 1/2 lbs. (≈2.5 kg)

Juniors and intermediates which exceed maximum weight limits may be shown in higher age classifications. No animal may be shown in a lower age classification than its true age.

=== General type ===
==== Body ====
30 Points. The body type is to be of mandolin shape. Body is to be medium length, with broad, meaty back and a deep, firm loin. Shoulders are to be strong and firm, with a well-sprung rib cage, tapering slightly from broader, smooth hips. The body should present a definite arch when viewed from the side. The topline is to be a smooth curve, starting at the back of the shoulder, rising to a high point over the middle of the back, and curving over the hips to complete the arch.

- Faults - Extremely long or short body length; flat, lacking arched outline.

==== Head ====
10 Points. The head is to be full from top to bottom, with a well-filled face and jaws. Head is to present a distinct curvature between the eyes and nose with a medium broad muzzle. Size of the head is to conform to the body more massive in bucks than in does. A medium dewlap is permissible on does.

- Faults - Narrow pinched head; lack of curvature in profile; excessive dewlap.

==== Ears ====
10 points. ears are to be well furred and carried in a V-shaped manner. Ideal length is to be 5 or more inches in seniors and intermediates.

- Faults - Thin ears; very heavy ears; weak earbase.
- Disqualification from Competition: Ear length less than 4 3/4 in (120 mm) on seniors or intermediates.

==== Feet and legs ====
5 points. Front feet and legs are to be straight, strong and of medium bone. Hind feet and legs are to be straight, powerful, and well furred. Legs are to be medium bone, in proportion to size of body. In whites, toenails are to be white or flesh colored. In blacks and blues, toenails should be dark.

- Disqualification from Competition: Non-matching toenails on the same foot or corresponding foot.

=== Fur ===
20 points. The coat is to be very dense and glossy. The guard hairs should be plentiful and of fine diameter, but strong enough to fall or roll gently back into position when stroked from tail to head. Density and texture share equal importance. Ideal fur length is between 1 1/4 and 1 1/2 inches. (Recommended for showing in breed fur.)

- Faults - Soft, woolly fur; harsh, heavy fur.
- Disqualification from Competition: Fur under 1 inch or over 2 inches long.

=== Color ===
20 Points.

==== Black ====
Color is to be deep, glossy, jet black, carried well down into a blue undercolor.

- Eyes - dark brown.
- Faults - Stray white hairs; rust; hutch stain; lack of even color.
- Disqualification from Competition: Any other color eyes; white spot(s).

==== Blue ====
Color is to be a clean shade of light lavender blue, carried well down into the base, free from silvering.

- Eyes - blue-gray, with ruby cast to pupil permissible
- Faults - Stray white hairs; rust; hutch stain; lack of even color; any other shade of blue than described.
- Disqualification from Competition: Any other color eyes; white spot(s).

==== White ====
Color is to be pure white, with no ivory cast.

- Eyes - to be a brilliant blue.
- Faults - Hutch stain.
- Disqualification from Competition: Any other color eyes.

=== Condition ===
5 Points.

- Faults - Soft and flabby flesh.

== See also ==
- List of rabbit breeds
