= Havana rabbit =

Breed of rabbit

Havana Rabbit
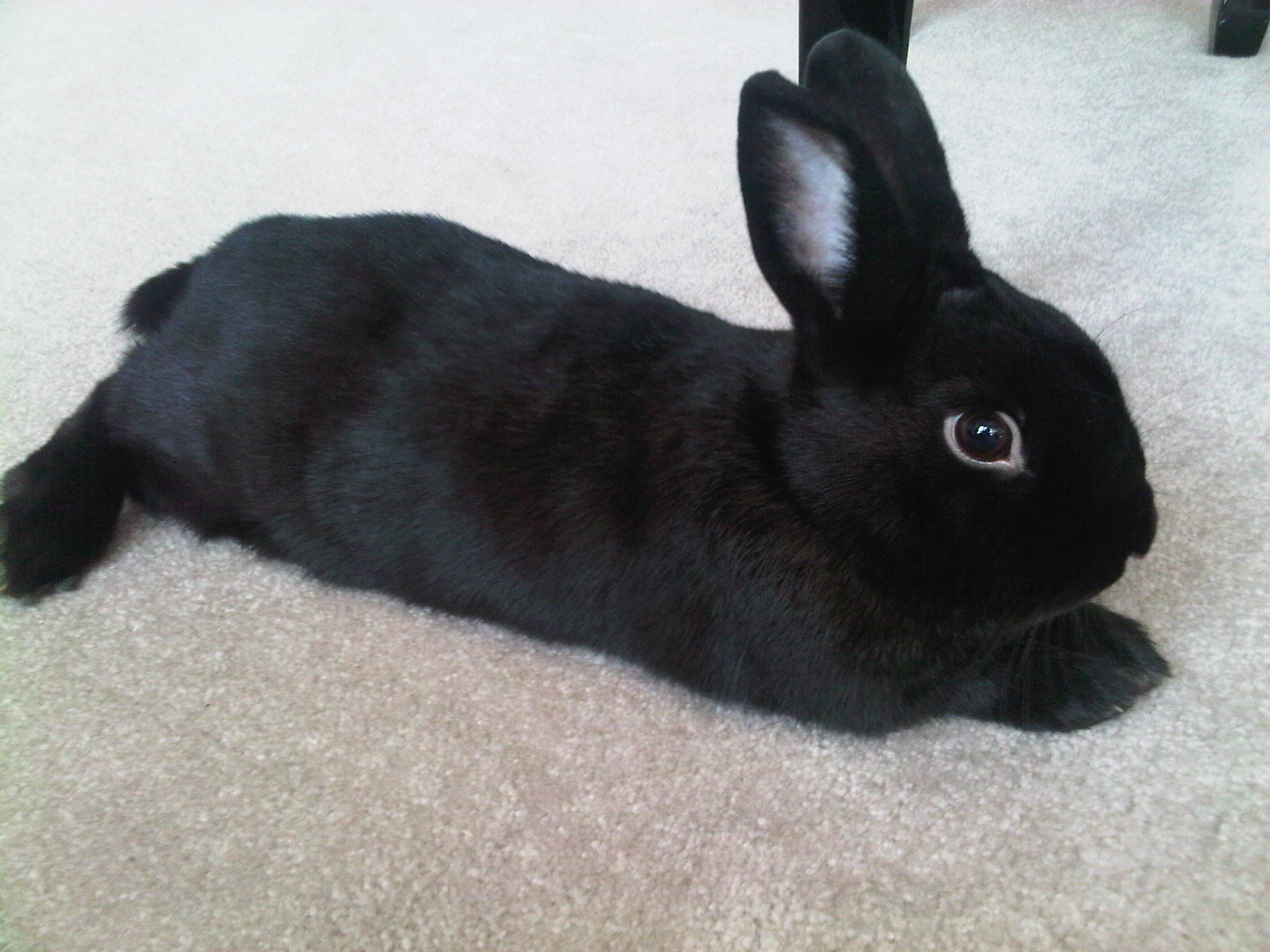

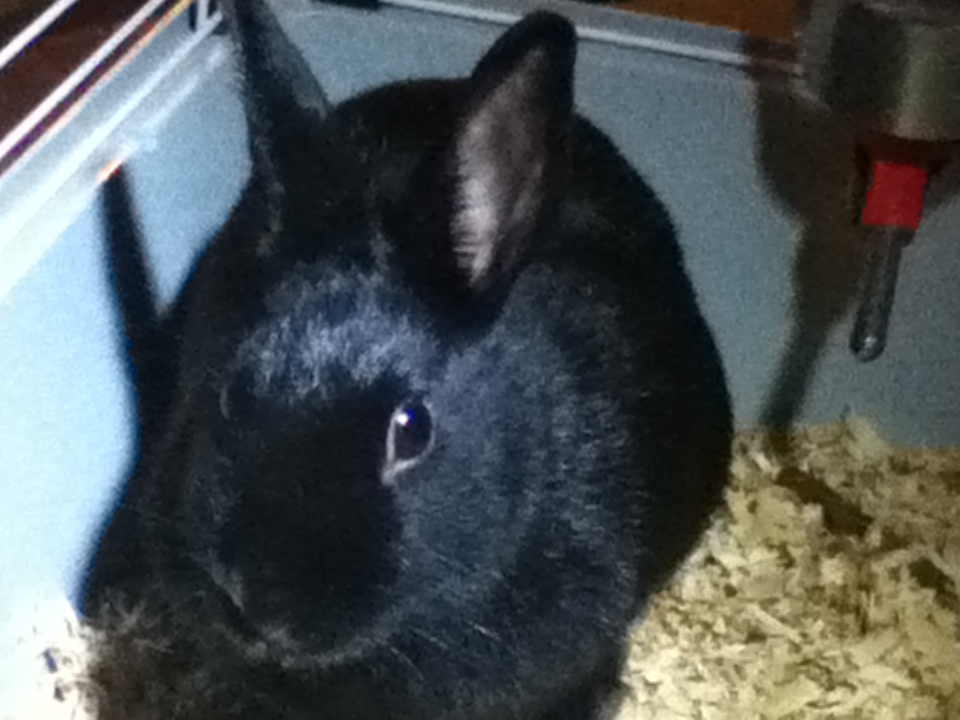
- Havana Rabbit Top: Havana Rabbit relaxing Bottom: Havana Rabbit with ears perked up
- Year created: 1898
- Origin: Netherlands
- Recognised mainly by: American Rabbit Breeders Association
- Weight: 2.0kg-2.9kg (4.5lbs-6.5lbs)

The Havana Rabbit is a rabbit breed that first appeared in the Netherlands in 1898. The breed is ancestral to several others, including the Fee de Marbourg, Perlefee and Gris Perle de Hal. Havanas are recognized by the American Rabbit Breeders Association in five colour types: chocolate, lilac, black, blue, and broken. Their average weight is between 4.5 pounds (2.0 kg) and 6.5 pounds (2.9 kg).

== Scientific Information ==
The Havana Rabbit belongs to:

- Domain: Eukarya-
- Kingdom: Animalia-
- Phylum: Chordata-
- Class: Mammalia-
- Order: Lagomorpha-
- Family: Leporidae-
- Genus: Oryctolagus-
- Species: Oryctolagus Cuniculus-

== See also ==
- List of rabbit breeds
