= British Rabbit Council =

British organisation for rabbit enthusiasts

Coordinates: 53.078°N 0.810°W

- BRC Logo
- Abbreviation: BRC
- Formation: 1934
- Legal status: Non-Profit Organisation
- Purpose: Rabbits in the UK
- Location: Purefoy House, 7 Kirk Gate, Newark-on-Trent, NG24 1AD
- Region served: UK
- Members: Rabbit Owners
- Main organ: Governing body
- Website: thebrc.org

The British Rabbit Council (BRC) is an organisation for rabbit enthusiasts in the United Kingdom. Rabbits are the UK's third most popular pet.

== History ==
The British Rabbit Council was formed in 1934 when the British Rabbit Society and the National Rabbit Council of Great Britain and her Dominions merged.

Local rabbit clubs in the 1940s were able to affiliate to the BRC. In 1952, the chair of the BRC, Mr T Leaver, said that there had been difficulties in the rabbit industry during the war, partly because of lack of government support before the war. "Despite these many setbacks, Mr. Leaver declared, 'We are an optimistic crowd, and we will carry on.' There were now over five hundred judges, who wanted people to breed exhibition rabbits with beautiful fur." Women were active in supporting the club and providing refreshments at meetings, but the organisation wanted more women active in showing rabbits. In the same year, the society set up examinations for rabbit-keeping. The first National Diplomas in Rabbit Husbandry were awarded in 1953.

In the 1960s, the BRC campaigned against bans on rabbits being kept in council housing, and suggested an upper limit of 12 rabbits per household.

=== Promotion of rabbit as a food source ===
In 1935, during the Great Depression, the BRC provided rabbits to unemployed people so that they could breed them. In 1941, during the Second World War, the BRC worked with the Domestic Poultry and Rabbit Keepers' Council and the Ministry of Agriculture to encourage keeping rabbits as a food source. The BRC's legal department was said in 1944 to be ready to challenge any local councils which prohibited the keeping of rabbits, as this was contrary to the war effort.

After the war, the council's promotion of rabbit as a food source continued. In 1954 a representative of the council said that "all rabbit breeders had a duty to the nation and that was a better feeding stuffs conversion into meat", to lessen the country's reliance on imported food. In 1959 the society tried to encourage mass production of rabbit meat; this was opposed by the RSPCA. The BRC set up the Commercial Rabbit Association as part of this project. In 1977, the secretary of the BRC "said that two or three does, kept in an ordinary backyard could produce enough meat for one family meal a week".

=== Membership numbers ===
In 1946, the society had around ten thousand members, and another quarter of a million through affiliated clubs. Its slogan was "Grow more rabbit meat for home consumption, and Angora wool for export". In January 1951 it had 70,000 members. In March 1951 it was said to have "more than 6,000 individual members", and 700 affiliated clubs.

=== Government grants ===
In 1951, the society was given a government grant to enable it to support Rabbit Clubs. In 1953, it was given a grant for Domestic Food Production of £1,150.

=== Myxomatosis ===
In the 1950s, the society warned people about the danger of myxomatosis. It carried out a survey of rabbit owners to try to manage the effects of the disease. The council successfully lobbied for inoculations against myxomatosis to be available for domestic rabbits. Members of the society were directly involved with dealing with the effects of the disease among domestic rabbits. They campaigned against the deliberate spreading of the disease.

=== Rabbit hemorrhagic disease ===
In 1992, the BRC temporarily stopped rabbit shows because of rabbit hemorrhagic disease. It campaigned for vaccination for rabbits against the disease.

== Recognised breeds ==
There are over 50 breeds recognised by the British Rabbit Council and over 500 varieties. These are divided into four groups – Fancy, Lop, Normal Fur, Rex.

== Shows ==
To enter most rabbit shows, participants must be Council members and their rabbits must have a metal ring around one hind leg registered in their name. In 1993, the Council was said to give out a hundred thousand rings each year. In breed classes, the rabbits are judged to standards defined by the BRC. The BRC awards stars, certificates for winning breed classes, diplomas, and identifies champion rabbits.

== See also ==
- American Rabbit Breeders Association
- List of rabbit breeds
