= List of rabbit breeds not recognized by the American Rabbit Breeders Association or the British Rabbit Council =

This is a list of rabbit breeds not recognized by the American Rabbit Breeders Association (ARBA) or the British Rabbit Council (BRC).

== Alexandria ==
The Alexandria Rabbit Line originates from Egypt, and got its name from the city of Alexandria. It is an Egyptian paternal rabbit line. It has a medium-sized rabbit, weighing 2.7–4.1 kg (6–9 lb). It has erect ears, and its fur can be found in brown, tan, or black.

== Altex ==
Altex /ɔːltɛks/ is a breed of domestic rabbit developed, beginning in 1994, for cuniculture, specifically for the commercial meat industry. The name Altex is derived from Al plus Tex, referring to this breed's initial development at Alabama A&M University and at Texas A&M University–Kingsville. The breed was developed from Flemish Giant, Champagne d'Argent, and Californian stock, and later with New Zealand white crossings. Altex rabbits weigh 4.5 to 9.1 kg (10 to 20 lb) and have coat markings similar to the Californian rabbit (having dark points).

== Argenté Clair ==
The Argenté Clair, called Light Groot Silver in Germany, is a rare breed. It is similar in appearance to the Champagne d'Argent, but heavily silvered and with recessive dilute blue as an undercoat (instead of black). It is used for its fur, meat, or as a domestic pet.

== Armenian Marder ==
The Armenian Marder is a breed of rabbit native to Armenia. It is principally raised for meat. The breed was established in 1940. It is the result of crossbreeding the Chinchilla rabbit, the Himalayan rabbit, and native rabbit breeds. Fully grown males weigh from 4–4.5 kg (8.8–9.9 lb), and have a body length of 50–55 cm (20–22 in). The average litter size is 7–8 kittens.

== Aurora Negro ==
The Aurora Negro Rabbit originates from Guatemala. It is a large sized rabbit and weights 3.6–4.5 kg (8–10 lb). Its fur comes in blue-gray, gray, black, and white with black spots. It is listed as a rare breed. The Aurora Negro rabbit was created from 1991 to 1994. Scientists mixed 37 different species of rabbit to find a new breed. In 1994, scientists created the Aurora Negro. It was a mix of a Angora rabbit and a Baladi Black rabbit. The "Aurora" part of the name comes from "Angora", and the "Negro" comes from its black fur. Its primary use is for meat, but is also a common domestic pet. It has been brought to other places such as the United States, Mexico, Canada, and Greece. Its primary diet is hay.

== Baladi Rabbits ==
=== Baladi Black ===
The Baladi Black rabbit weighs 2.7 kg (6 lb). It comes from the Faiyum region of Egypt.

=== Baladi Red ===
The Baladi Red rabbit weighs 2.8 kg (6.2 lb).

=== Baladi White ===
The Baladi White (or Baladi Albino) rabbit weighs 2.0 kg (4.3 lb).

== Bauscat ==
The Bauscat rabbit is an Egyptian breed bred to cope with the Egyptian climate. It is a medium-sized breed intended for meat production. It is similar to another Egyptian breed, the Baladi rabbit.

== Big Silver Marten ==
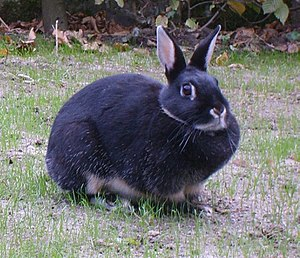
Big Silver Marten

The Big Silver Marten rabbit weighs 3.6–4.5 kg (8–10 lb), and originated in Croatia. It was created by scientists in 1924 as the offspring of two Silver Marten rabbit parents. The rabbit was more fit, healthy, and active than the regular Silver Marten. The Big Silver Marten was brought to the United States, France, Germany, and other places in the 1930s. It can live both indoors and outdoors, as well as living comfortably in temperatures from 10 to 27 °C (50 to 80 °F).

== Blanc de Popielno ==
The Blanc de Popielno, also known as the Popielno White, is a breed of domestic rabbit developed for meat production. Originating in 1950 in Chorzelów, the breed was further refined in the Polish village of Popielno. It is an albino rabbit with an average weight of 4–5 kg (8.8–11.0 lb).

== Blue of Sint-Niklaas ==
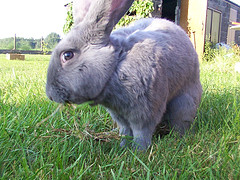
Blue of Sint-Niklaas

The Blue of Sint-Niklaas (Dutch: Sint-Niklase Blauwe), also called the St. Nicholas Blue, is a Flemish rabbit breed that has been bred since the 19th century near the city of Sint-Niklaas to supply the local fur industry. It is one of the oldest fur-rabbit breeds of the world. The Van Beveren, also bred for its fur, is related, and has been bred in the same region of Flanders, the Waasland. Internationally, only blue varieties are accepted by the standard, unlike the Van Beverens, where other varieties are accepted. The Blue of Sint-Niklaas is much heavier, up to 5.4 kg (12 lb), resembling the Flemish Giant. After the decrease of pelt-selling and fur industries in the region (and the world) the breed became almost extinct, as it was not popular as a pet or for meat.

== Bourbonnais Grey ==
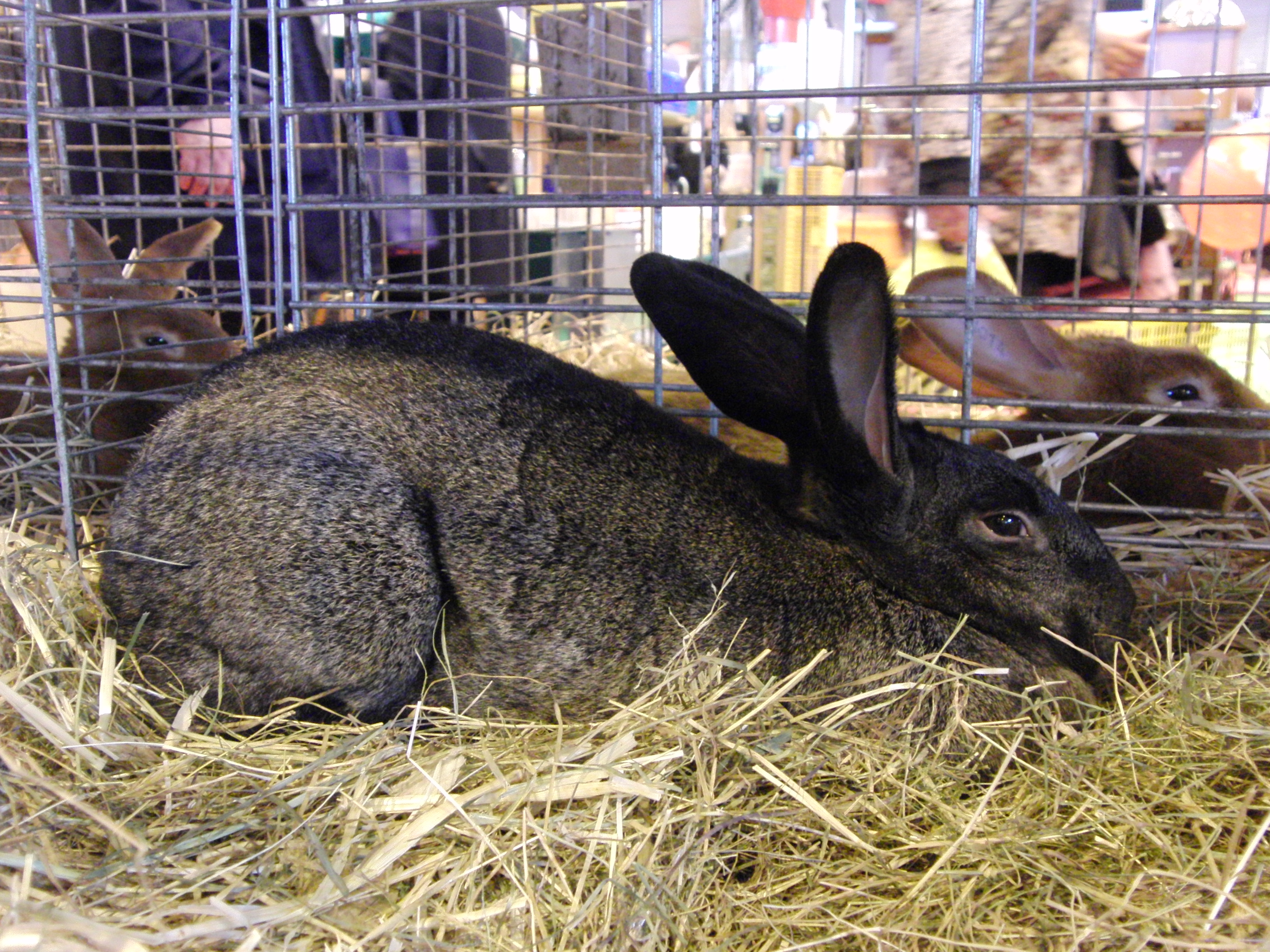
Bourbonnais Grey

The Bourbonnais Grey is a rare breed rabbit originally from France. It is a medium breed reaching around 4–5 kg (8.8–11.0 lb). It only comes in a slate blue color.

== Brazilian ==
The Brazilian Rabbit is a medium-sized hardy breed originated in Brazil. They were developed as a meat breed. It weighs 3.2–5.0 kg (7–11 lb) and has a lifespan of 5–10 years. It was created in the 1980s by a Peace Corp volunteer.

== Brown Chestnut of Lorraine ==
The Brown Chestnut of Lorraine (also known as the Brun Marron de Lorraine) is a breed of domestic rabbit that originated in France and is named for the Lorraine region. The breed is currently considered rare. It was developed by Ch. Kauffmann from Garenne and Tan rabbit stock. The ideal weight for this breed is 2–2.4 kg (4.4–5.3 lb). This rabbit has chestnut brown fur. The Brown Chestnut of Lorraine is a small slender rabbit, harmoniously rounded. It has an angular head with prominent eyes, dense fur, and short hair. The rabbit has a chestnut brown uniform color with a well-defined orange-brown outer-color, and an under-color bluish including the belly. The ears are bluish on their inner side and edged with a black border.

== Caldes ==
The Caldes rabbit is a Spanish breed of rabbit. It is a terminal sire used to cross breed with other rabbits for meat. They are primarily found in an albino color. It was created in Barcelona, Spain.

== Canadian Plush Lop ==
The Canadian Plush Lop is a type of lop rabbit found in Canada. Created using Astrex as well as Holland Lop and Mini Rex base stock, the Canadian Plush Lop is a curly breed. It has a more fully arched conformation than the other rex lops, is very bold and friendly, and excels at rabbit agility. The breed does not carry the dwarf gene and so tends to be 1.8–2.7 kg (4–6 lb) in adult weight. Canadian Plush Lops were developed mainly in Alberta since the mid-1990s. The work was initiated by Dr. Helga Vierich and Brenda Wheeler, two Edmonton area breeders, and a Breeder's Group, formed in 2004, consisting of six rabbitries, carries on the work today. The Canadian Plush Lop (or CPLop as it is sometimes called) shares with the rare Astrex rabbit the tendency for the kits to be curly until the first juvenile moult, followed by a less curly "eclipse" coat. Then, at eight to eighteen months, the curls return with the first full adult moult. Canadian Plush Lops are the only fully arched lop breed and are one of only three curly-rex breeds in existence, but people who have come to know this breed tend to find their extremely people-oriented temperament their most remarkable feature.

== Carmagnola Grey ==
The Carmagnola Grey rabbit is a rare breed from Italy that is almost extinct. It is a large breed bred for meat. The coat of the Carmagnola Grey exhibits chinchilla coloration. The average weight of an adult Carmagnola Grey is 3.5–4.5 kg (7.7–9.9 lb). Fewer than 500 specimens were found in a 2002 population study. One of Carnmagnola's grey rabbits' diets consisted of perilla seeds (Perilla frutescens L.). Perilla seeds are considered as a supplement in their diet as it enhances growth, development, and meat quality.

== Chaudry ==
The Chaudry rabbit is an albino breed of domestic rabbit that originated in France and was developed for meat production. The Chaudry, which has a minimum weight of 4 kg (8.8 lb), was created by combining every pure albino rabbit breed known in France.

== Criollo ==
The Criollo Rabbit is a small rabbit, weighing 1.4–1.8 kg (3–4 lb). It originates from Mexico and Central America. It was created by scientists in Mexico in 1940 by mixing an American Fuzzy Lop with a Pygmy rabbit.

== Cuban Brown Rabbit ==
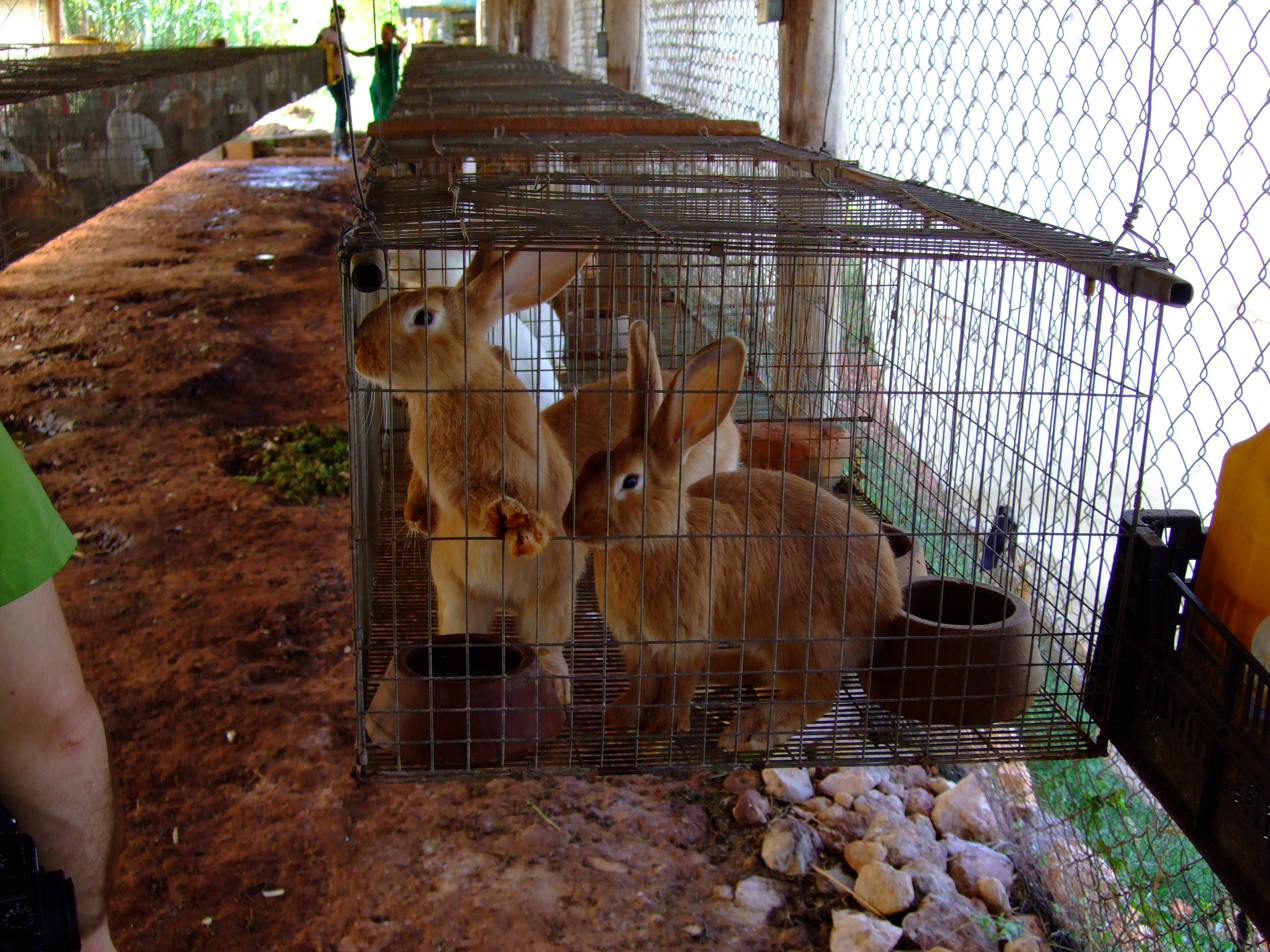
2 Cuban Brown rabbits

The Cuban Brown Rabbit is a medium-sized rabbit, weighing 4.1–5.0 kg (9–11 lb) pounds. The rabbit originates from Cuba, and has brown fur, explaining the name Cuban Brown. It also has large, erect ears (15 cm (5.9 in)). The Cuban Brown is a very social rabbit, and gets along well with other rabbits and animals. It was bred in Cuba in the mid 20th century. It was a mix of the Spanish Giant Brown Rabbit and the Red Rabbit. It is resistant to ectoparasites and can survive on many foods. The Cuban Brown rabbit is currently threatened. It is mostly used as a pet, but sometimes is used for its meat.

== Czech Red ==
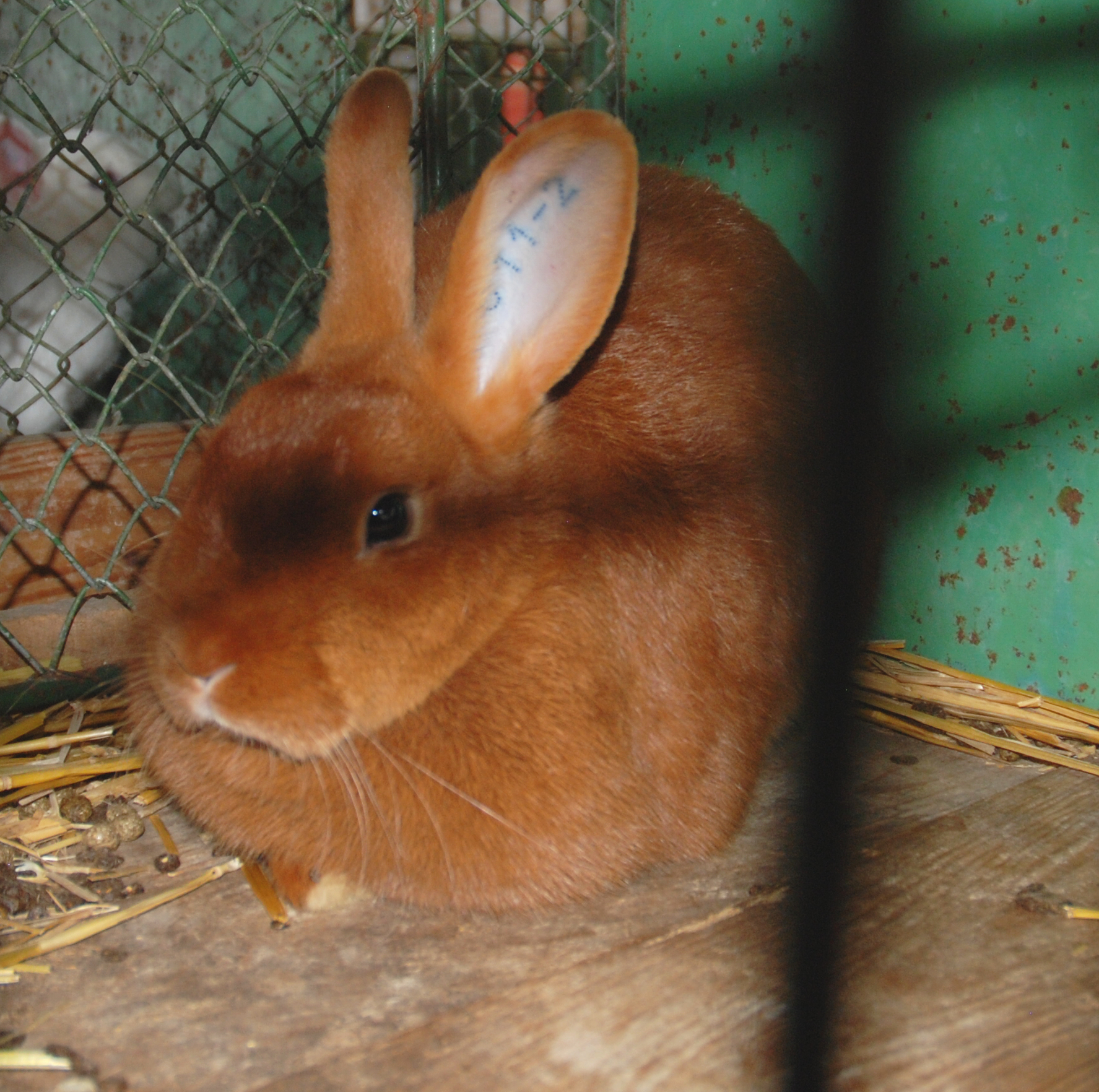
Czech Red Rabbit

The Czech Red (Czech: Český červený králík) is a domestic rabbit breed from what is now the Czech Republic. It was officially recognized in 1959. It weighs about 2.5–3.2 kg (5.5–7.1 lb). The colour of the hairs is gray or red-brown. It has been selected by Theodor Svododa from Modřany in 1940.

== Czech Solver ==
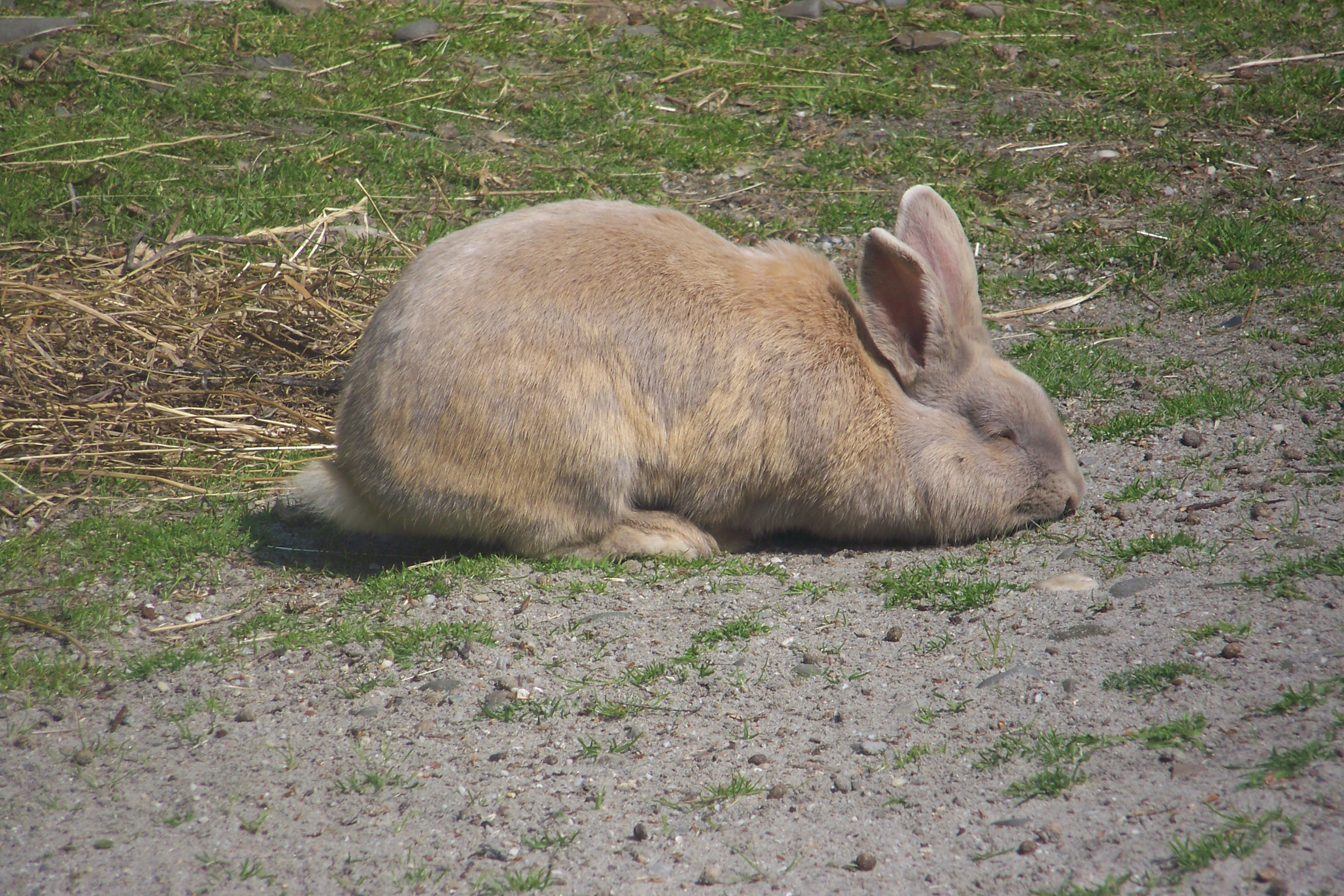
Czech Solver Rabbit

The Czech Solver rabbit is a rare breed of domestic rabbit, that originated in the Czech Republic. It has dense silky fur which is light-sand in colour right down to the skin, with some slate-blue ticking and shading across the body.

== Czech Spot ==
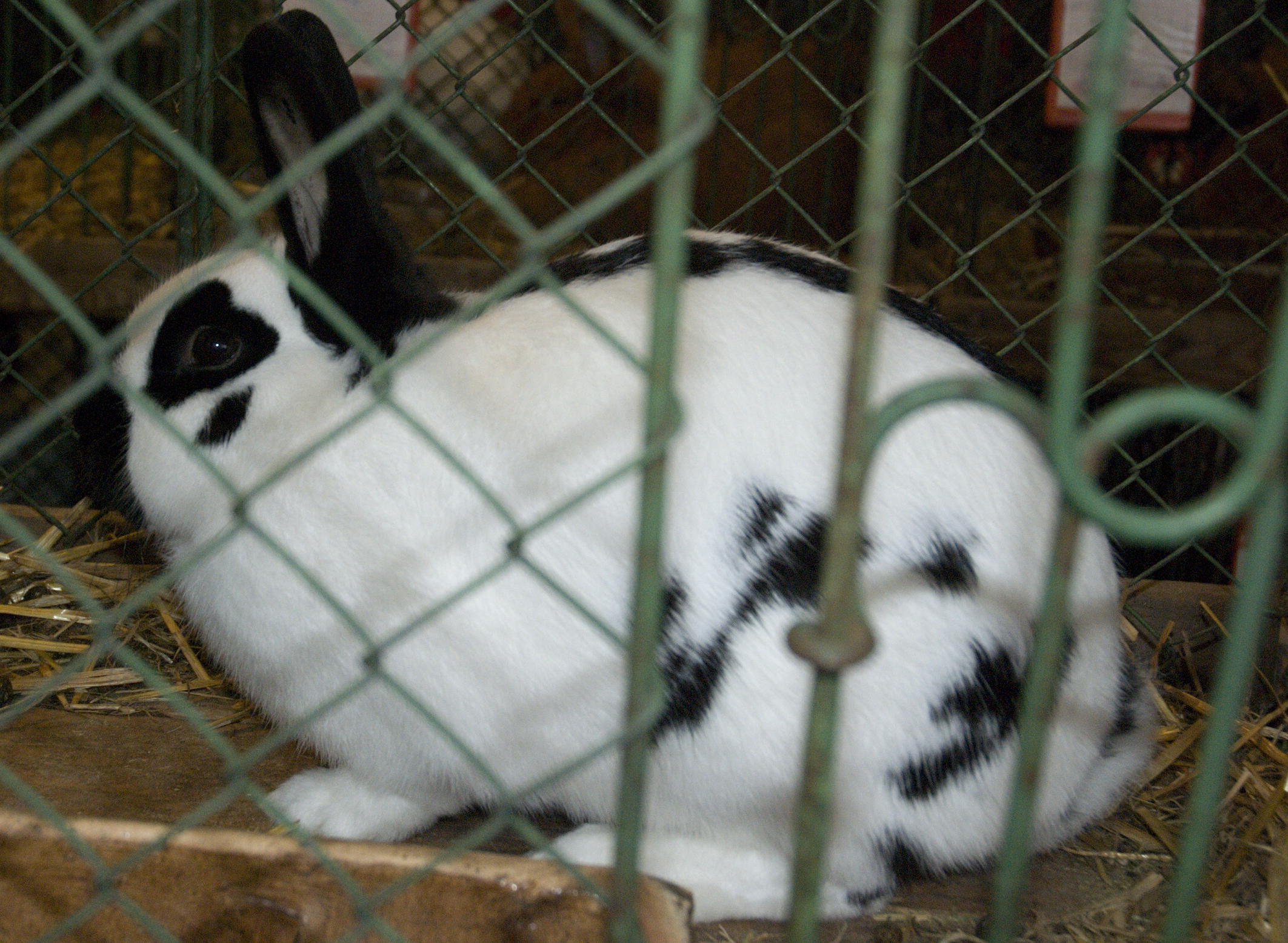
Czech Spotted Rabbit

The Czech Spotted Rabbit (Czech Checkered Rabbit) is a medium-sized rabbit, weighing 2.7–3.6 kg (6–8 lb). It originated in the Czech Republic. It has short, erect ears. The rabbit comes in agouti, black, blue, beige, tortoise, and tri-color. It has a spotted pattern. It was created in 1908. It is a mix of a Checkered Giant and a Dalmatian Rabbit. The name "Czech Spotted" comes from the rabbit being from the Czech Republic, and its spotted coat pattern. It has been recognized by the Czech Association of Breeders since 2000.

== Czech White ==
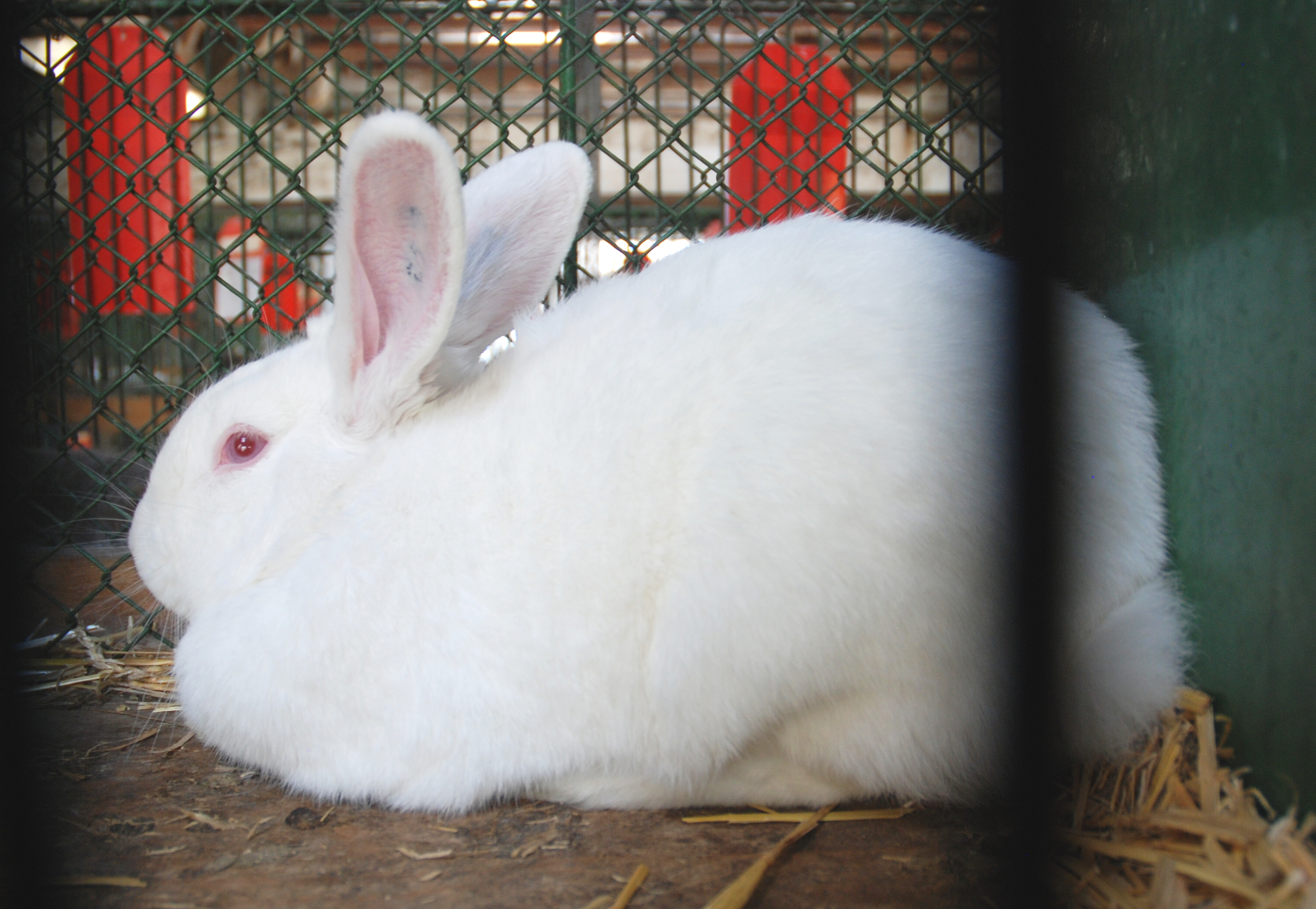
Czech White

The Czech White Rabbit is a large sized rabbit, weighing 4.0–5.0 kg (8.8–11 lb). It originated in the Czech Republic and the European Union (EU). It has short and erect ears. Its fur is a glossy white, and sometimes has black spots. The rabbit was bred from 1928 to 1930. It was a mix of the New Zealand white rabbit and the Californian rabbit. It was created by scientist Zofka, in Kladno, Czechia. A second type of Czech White rabbit was created in 1996, which was a wild Eastern cottontail and a Belgian Giant White rabbit.

== Enderby Island ==
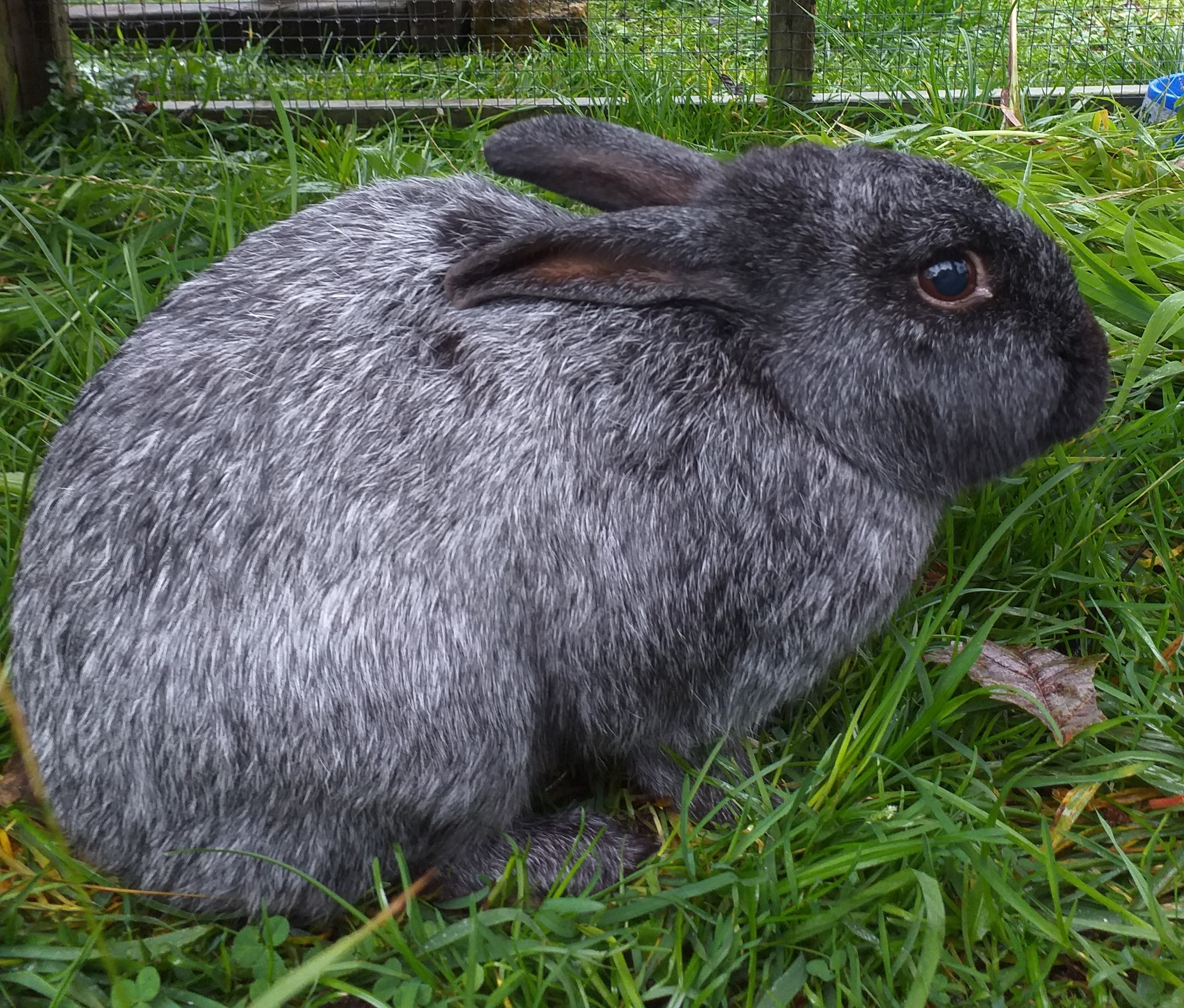
Enderby Island Rabbit

The Enderby Island Rabbit, or simply Enderby rabbit, is a rare breed. It originates from rabbits introduced to Enderby Island, an uninhabited subantarctic island in New Zealand's Auckland Islands group, from Australia in October 1865 to serve as castaway food. Over 130 years the isolated population became a distinctive variety. The rabbits were exterminated from Enderby Island in the early 1990s, but a breeding group of 49 rabbits was rescued by the Rare Breeds Conservation Society of New Zealand in September 1992. Enderby Island Rabbits are mainly silver-grey in colour, with an undercoat of dark slate-blue. Their heads, ears and tails are very dark, sometimes black. Because of a recessive gene, a small proportion of the rabbits are born cream or beige in colour. Adult rabbits weigh about 2 kg (4.4 lb). Kits are born black or cream then silver ticking develops at puberty. Coat colours are described as Champagne to slate (light to dark silver) and creme.

== Gabali ==
The Gabali is a rare rabbit breed which originates in Egypt. It is primarily agouti in colour and was bred as a meat breed by the Bedouins. It weighs 2.7–3.2 kg (6–7 lb).

== Fox ==
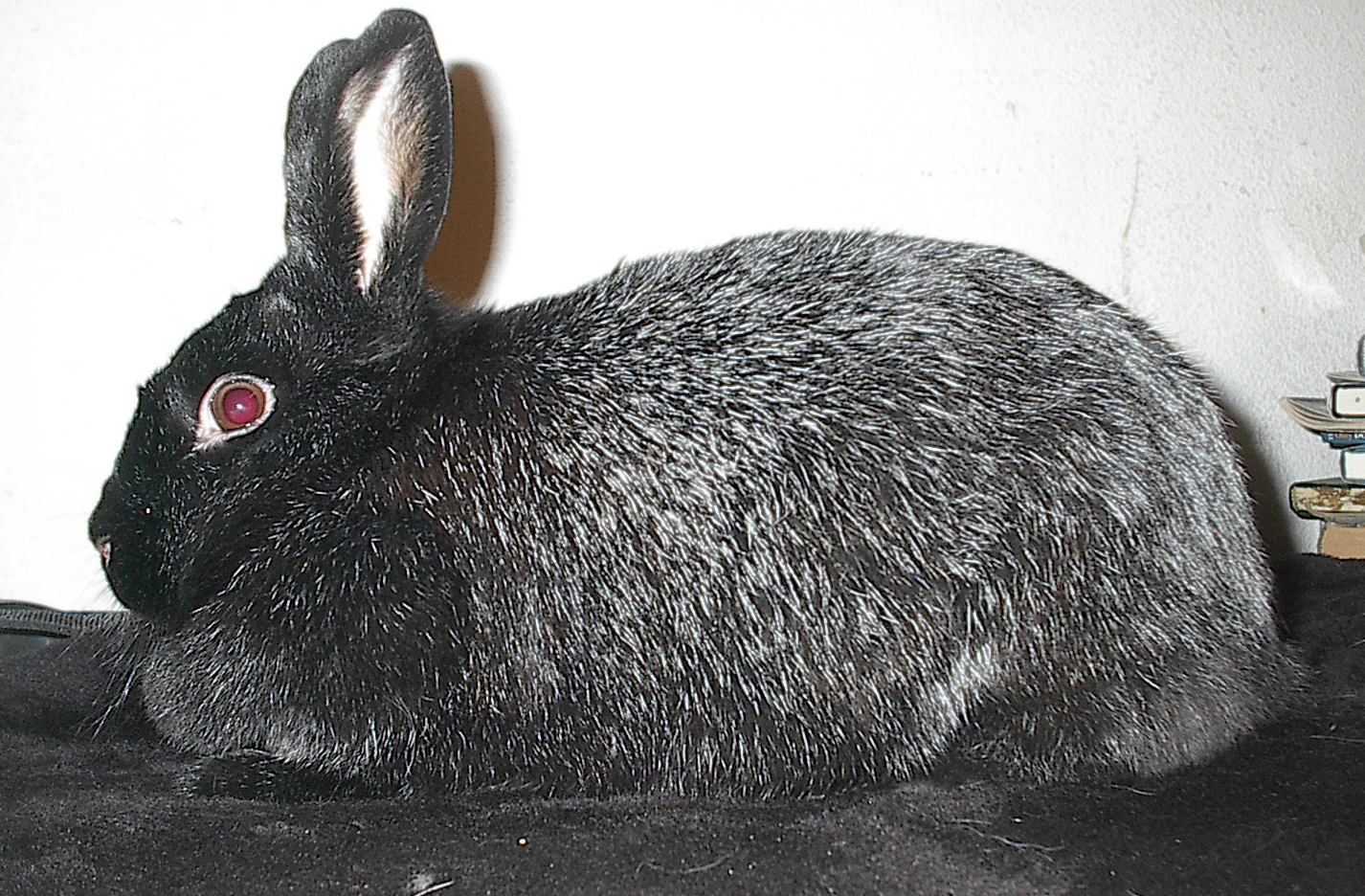
Fox rabbit

The Fox rabbit is a long-haired rabbit breed whose fur is subject to the normal seasonal hair change, and therefore does not have to be cut or trimmed. It weighs 3–4 kg (6.6–8.8 lb), and comes in brown, black, white, and silver. It was first bred in Switzerland. Fox rabbits were bred jointly by Hermann Leifer from Coburg and Müller from Zug in Switzerland using Angora rabbits. The aim of the breed was to imitate the half-length blue fox fur, but this did not succeed. While the breeders in Switzerland limited themselves to the blue color, other colors were bred relatively early in Germany. The breed has been recognized in Germany since 1962.

A dwarf version of the Fox rabbit was created in Germany at the end of the 1970s by crossing fox rabbits with Hermelinkaninchen, sometimes also, in the absence of suitable fox rabbits, by crossing ermine rabbits with Angora rabbits. One of the first breeders of this breed was Herbert Richter from Treuenbrietzen in Brandenburg, along with others. The recognition as a breed took place in the GDR in 1980 with the "Assessment Regulations for Breed Rabbits in Socialist Countries" in all the colors permitted for fox rabbits and in 1986 by the Central Association of German Rabbit Breeders (Today Central Association of German Race Rabbit Breeders) in the Federal Republic of Germany. In the 1991 standard, the breed was named as fox dwarfs and the weight was set at 1.1–1.35 kg (2.4–3.0 lb).

== German Angora ==
The German Angora rabbit weighs 2.5–5.5 kg (5.5–12.1 lb), and originated in Germany. It comes in albino, black, blue, brown, tortoiseshell, and agouti. It is currently recognized by the International Association of German Angora Rabbit Breeders (IAGARB).

== Giant Havana ==
The Giant Havana rabbit, also called the Great Havana rabbit, is a large sized rabbit, weighing 4.5–5.0 kg (10–11 lb). They come in dark brown, chocolate, and sometimes black. It was bred in 1898 in Holland, and was brought to France in 1906. The breed is only recognized in Nordic cultures.

== Giant Marburger ==
The Giant Marburger is a large sized rabbit, weighing 4.5–5.4 kg (10–12 lb). Its fur is light gray or a pigeon blue. England, Belgium, Denmark, and the Netherlands all claim credit for creating the breed.

== Giant Siver ==
The Giant Siver rabbit is large sized, and weighs 4.5–5.0 kg (10–11 lb). It comes in black, white, and grey. It was bred in the Champagne province of France in 1730.

== Giant Smoke Pearl ==
The Giant Smoke Pearl rabbit, also called the Giant Sable, is medium-sized, and weighs 3.6–5.0 kg (8–11 lb). Its color of fur can be brown, sepia, and beige. It was bred in Germany and the Netherlands. It, like the Smoke Pearl rabbit, was bred for its soft fur.

== Giza White ==
The Giza White is a small to medium-sized rabbit, which weighs 2.3–3.6 kg (5–8 lb), and originated in Egypt. Its only fur color is white. In 1932, two Baladi rabbits were bred by the Animal Breeding Department at Cairo University, Giza, Egypt. The original Giza White rabbit came in white, black, grey, and blue. In 1937, systematic breeding took place and created the rabbit only with an albino type of fur. It had a faster rate of growth and a larger litter size. The Giza White improved and replaced the Giza rabbit (El-Giza El-Mohassan).

== Gotland ==
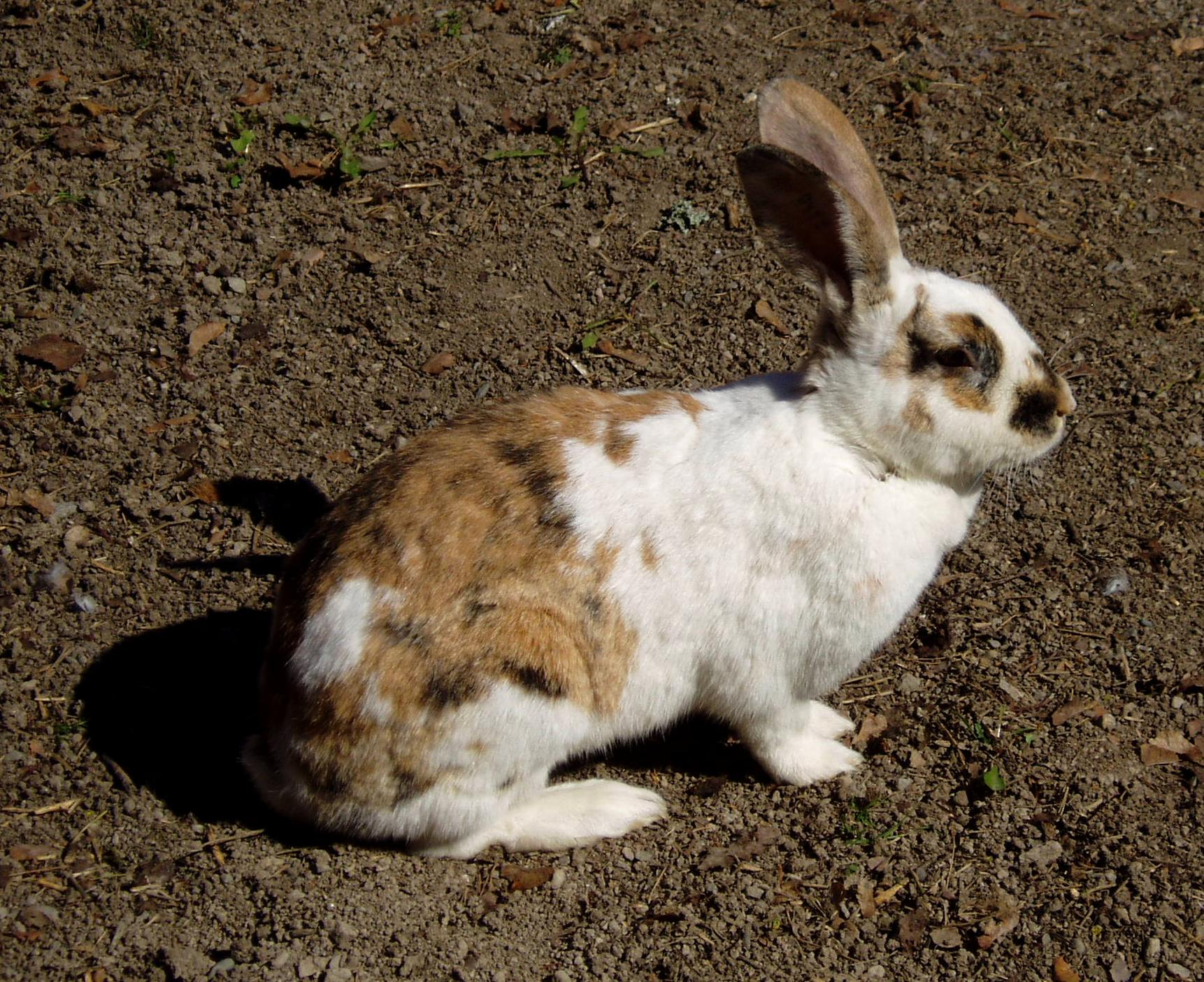
Gotland rabbit

The Gotland rabbit is a Swedish variety of rabbit of medium size that comes in a variety of colours. The Gotland rabbit has official landrace status in Sweden and is considered an endangered variety, but is also being developed as a formal breed under the same name. The landrace is related to the even rarer Mellerud rabbit. Rabbits have been held at farms in Sweden since at least the 1500s, though decreasing in popularity during the 1900s. These rabbits were referred to as "bondkaniner" ("farm rabbits") as early as 1881 and were kept mainly for their meat and pelts. As a result of this, health, productivity and nursing instincts were considered more important that type and colour, which has traditionally been of higher importance in showing breeds. The Gotland rabbit has therefore managed to retain a large genetic diversity in terms of shape and colour, at the same time maintaining good health and few known genetic illnesses. As show breeds gained popularity, the farm rabbits became rarer until all but extinct. A few remaining populations were discovered in the 1970s on the island of Gotland.

Despite having never been bred towards a written breed standard until recent times, most Gotland rabbits share a distinctive and recognizable type. The variety is of medium size with an adult weight of 3–4 kg (6.6–8.8 lb). The body of the doe is relatively elongated with a fine head while the buck is usually somewhat more compact with a rounder head and thicker muzzle. There is no weight difference between the genders. The ears are of medium length and relatively thin, pointed rather than rounded. The eyes are somewhat large with an alert expression. Any eye colour is allowed. The coat is short and fine, usually straight although a few rex coated Gotlands have been known. Any pattern and colour is allowed.

== Gouwenaar ==
The Gouwenaar, also called the Lilac rabbit or the Gouda rabbit, is a small to medium-sized rabbit, weighing 2.5–3.2 kg (5.5–7.1 lb). It comes in grey and blue. It originated in the Netherlands in 1927, by a Dutch pigeon breeder, who bred a Fee de Marbourg with a Havana rabbit.

== Grey Pearl of Halle ==
The Grey Pearl of Halle, also called the Little Squirrel rabbit, is a medium-sized rabbit, which weighs 2.5–3.2 kg (5.5–7.1 lb) pounds. The breed comes in blue, grey, and light brown. It originated in England, Belgium, and the Netherlands in 1920. It was created when a Beveren and a Lilac rabbit was bred. Belgium approved it in 1928 with the Flemish name parelgrijze van Halle and the French Gris Perle de Hal.

== Güzelçamlı ==
The Güzelçamlı rabbit is a medium-sized rabbit that weighs 2.3–3.6 kg (5–8 lb). It has a base fur color of white with brown spots. It originates from Turkey.

== Hungarian Giant ==
The Hungarian Giant is a large sized rabbit that weighs 5.0–6.8 kg (11–15 lb). The breed originated in Hungary about two hundred years ago. It was originally called the Hungarian Agouti, because it came in an agouti color. It is used for its meat as well as a domestic pet and show rabbit. Their fur is soft and dense.

== Isabella ==
The Isabella rabbit weighs 3.0–4.0 kg (6.6–8.8 lb), and is a small to medium rabbit. It was first created in England in the 1920s as the Beige rabbit. The breed was reintroduced in 1989 in Sweden, by Herbert Nielsson. The new breed was first shown at the National Exhibition in Malmö. Its fur comes in yellow, brown, and blue.

== Jamora ==
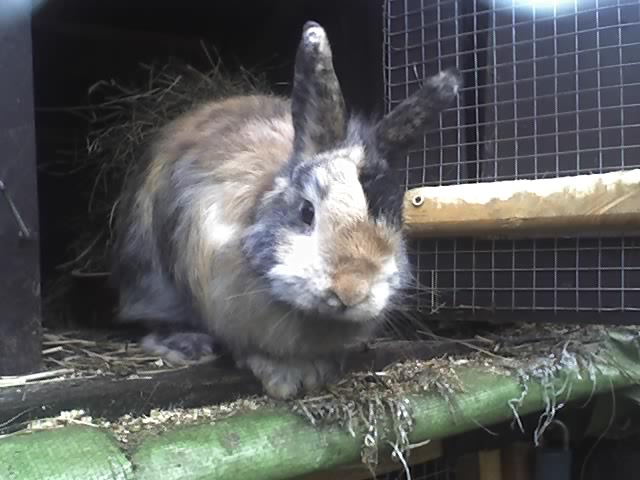

The Jamora rabbit, also called the Dwarf Gangora rabbit, is a long-haired rabbit breed, and long fur that is brightly colored with black and yellow. Their normal weight is 2 kg (4.4 lb), the maximum permissible weight is 2.5 kg (5.5 lb). It is considered a dwarf rabbit. It was first bred in the EU and Germany. The Jamora rabbit was created with the Fox rabbit and Angora rabbit the division of long-haired breeds. It was bred by Dr. Bernhard Thimm from Dornstadt, as well as Barbara Bauerschmidt and Johannes Heldt from Blaustein. The goal of these breeders was to create a small, long-haired breed of rabbits that stood out for their appearance. The Jamora rabbit was shown for the first time in 1990 in Nuremberg. The recognition by the Central Association of German Rabbit Breeders took place in 1994.

== Japanese White ==
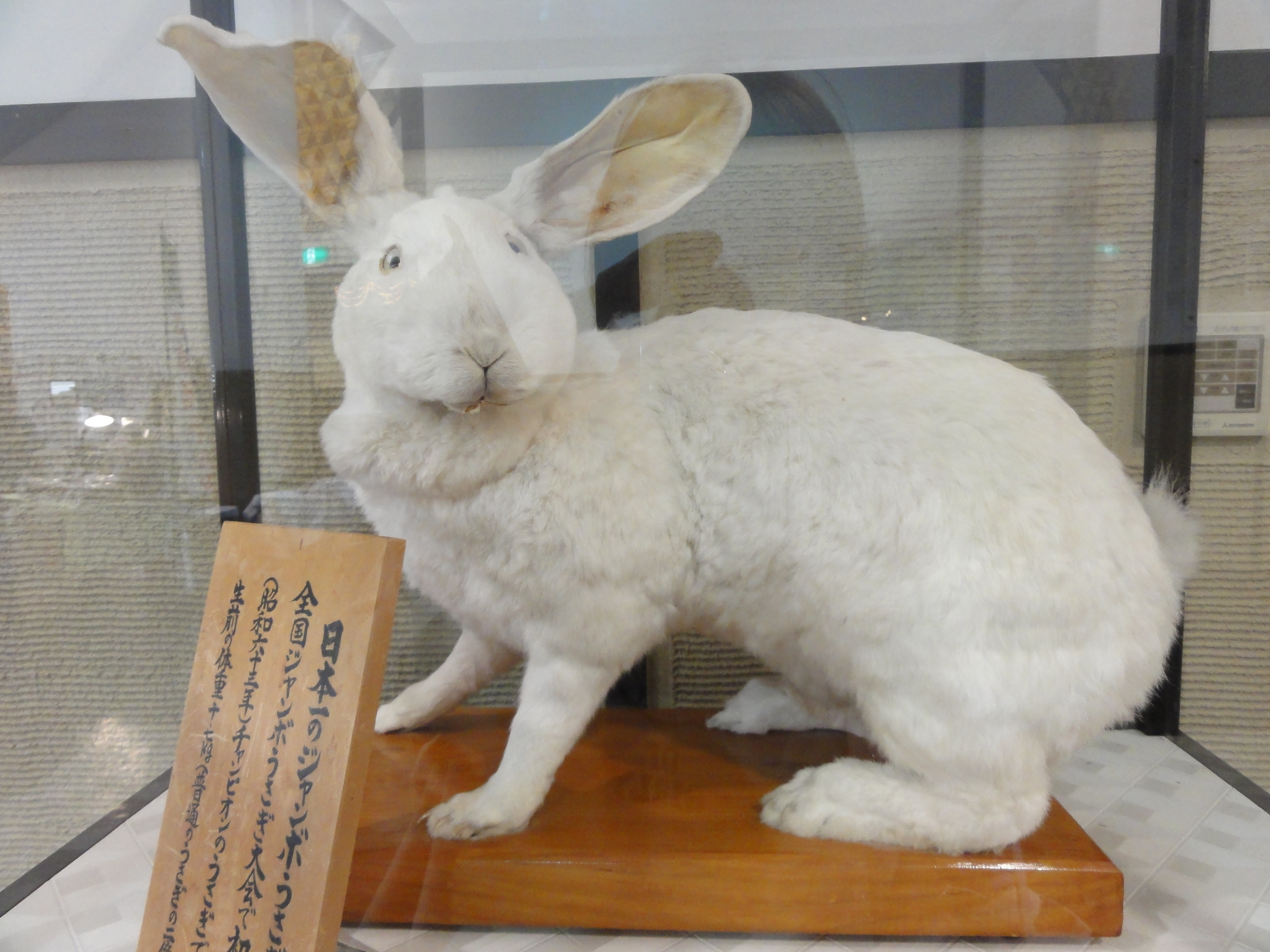
Jumbo rabbit

The Japanese White rabbit, also called the Jumbo rabbit and the Japanese Harlequin rabbit, is a breed of rabbit developed in Japan. It weighs 3–10 kg (6.6–22.0 lb), and comes in white and brown. It is bred for its fur and for its meat, but is also popular as a pet. The rabbit has been used in Inaba's White Rabbit and Choju giga. The rabbit was created in the early Meiji era, in 1870. It was originally used for pets, but as the Sino-Japanese War and the Russo-Japanese Wars occurred, the demand for meat and fur increased, which shifted the breeding to breeding them for fur and meat. After the war, breeding of the rabbit was recommended as part of emotional education in elementary schools, and it became widespread throughout the country.

== Kabyle ==
The Kabyle rabbit is a small rabbit, weighing 2.0–3.0 kg (4.4–6.6 lb). It comes in tan, black, white, and brown. The original breed was created in Algeria in the early 1970s, by combining a New Zealand white, Californian, and Burgundy Fawn. The present breed was created in the 1990s, by combining the same breeds again. The breed performs well at high temperatures.

== Liptov Baldspotted ==
The Liptov Baldspotted Rabbit (Slovak: Liptovský lysko) is a Slovak breed of domestic rabbit. It was officially recognized in 2005. It weighs approximately 4–4.25 kg (8.8–9.4 lb). There are three colour varieties: agouti, blue-agouti, and black. The pattern on the head is a white blaze (similar to "Dutch" head markings), but there are no other white markings anywhere on the rabbit. It has been bred in the Liptov region of Slovakia.

== Lynx ==
The Lynx rabbit, also called the Luchskaninchen rabbit and the Lux rabbit, is a medium-sized rabbit that weighs 2.5–3.2 kg (5.5–7.1 lb). The Lynx originates from Germany and was created by Karl Hoffmann from Düsseldorf who first exhibited the breed in 1919. In 1922 he named the breed Luchskaninchen. The rabbit comes in light grey, reddish-brown, a blue.

== Mecklenburger Piebald ==
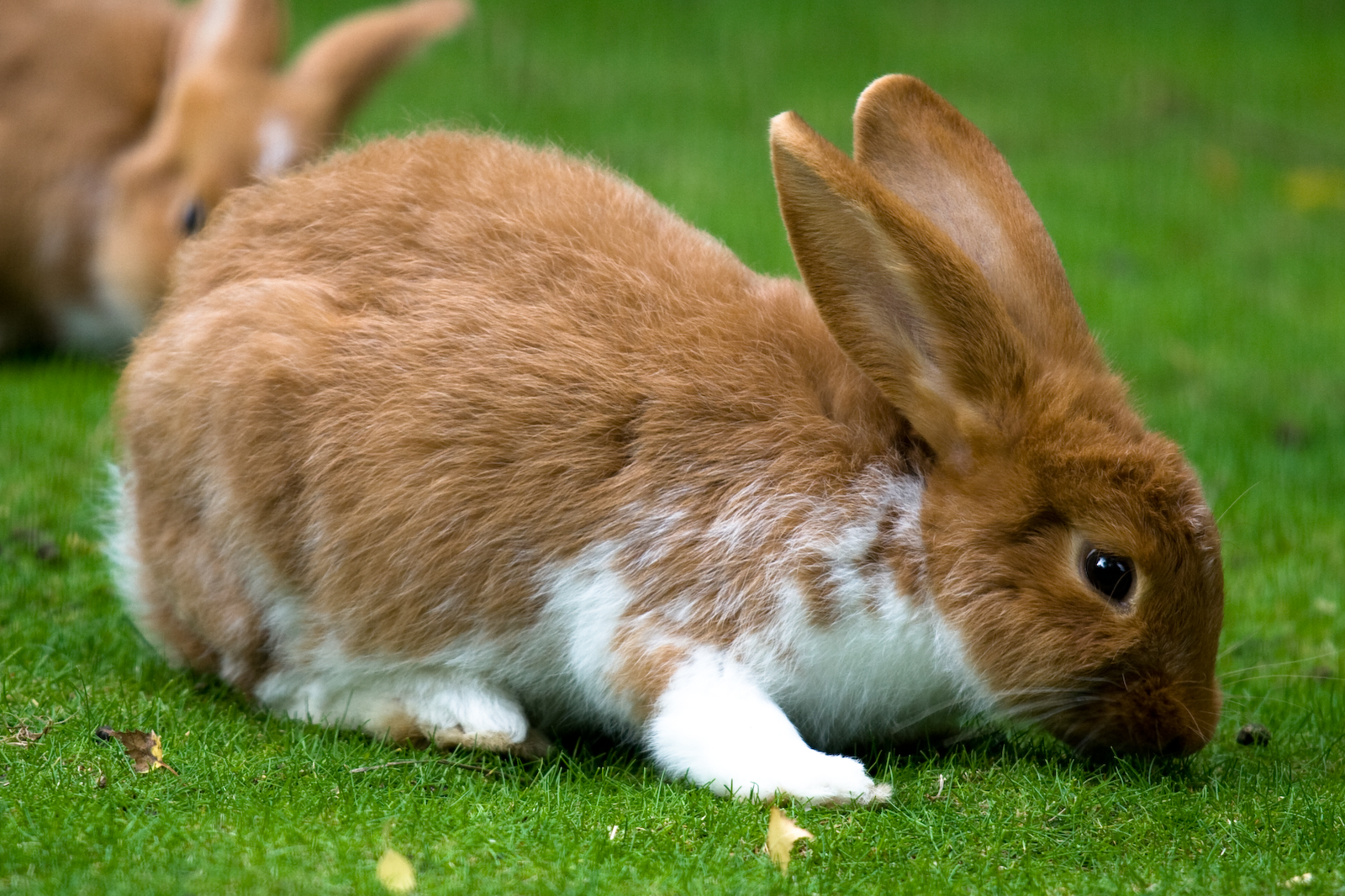
Mechlenburger Piebald

The Mecklenburger Piebald, also known as the Mecklenburg Pinto, is a medium-sized rabbit, weighing 4.5 to 5.5 kg (9.9 to 12.1 lb). It comes in agouti, black, blue, red, and steel. The Mecklenburg Piebald was bred out of Goldenbow in Mecklenburg by Rudolf Wulf in 1973. Wulf, who worked as a cattle breeder, had the goal of developing a breed of farm rabbits with the coloring and drawing of the black-and-white cattle he bred. He used a Giant Checkered rabbit, a blue Viennese rabbit, and an Alaska rabbit as starting breeds for his experiments. The breed was shown for the first time in 1980 in Wittenberge. In 1980, Günter Vetter from Bautzen bred the red color by crossing it with a red New Zealand rabbit. In 2012, scientists attempted to make a dwarf Mecklenburger Piebald, but it failed.

== Mellerud rabbit ==
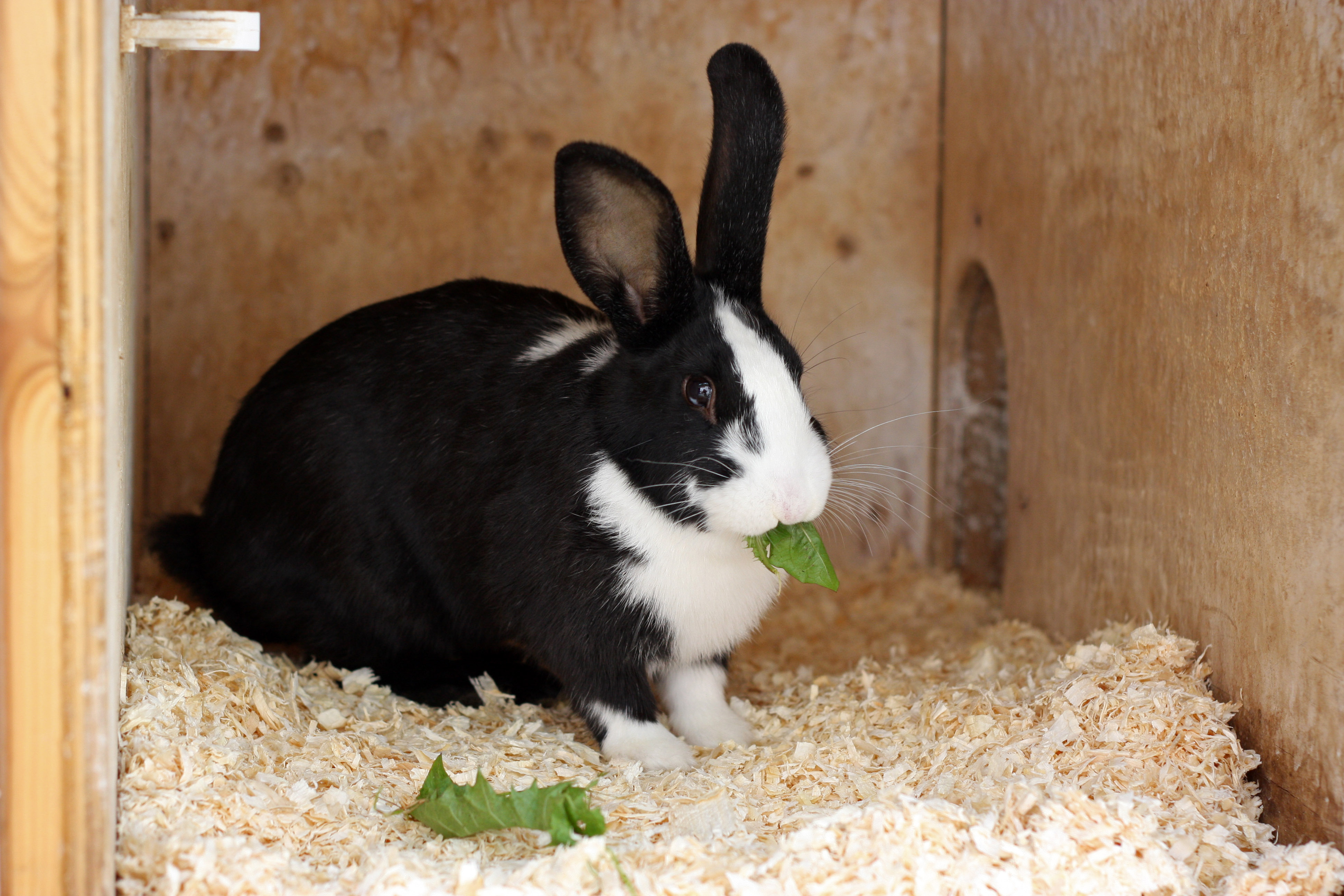
Mellerud rabbit

The Mellerud rabbit is a Swedish variety of rabbit of medium size that comes in albino or black with white markings. The Mellerud rabbit has official landrace status in Sweden and is considered a critically endangered variety. The Mellerud rabbit shares part of its history with the better-known Gotland rabbit. Both landraces originated from old lines of farm rabbits that were once common all over Sweden. These rabbits were referred to as bondkaniner ('farm-rabbits') as early as 1881 and were kept mainly for their meat and pelts. In the 1900s farm rabbits disappeared from most parts of the country and were largely believed to be extinct. The Mellerud rabbit is similar to the Gotland rabbit in terms of conformation. It is a medium-sized rabbit with an adult weight of 3–3.5 kg (6.6–7.7 lb). The body of the doe is relatively elongated with a fine head while the buck is usually somewhat more compact with a rounder head and thicker muzzle. There is no weight difference between the genders. The ears are of medium length and relatively thin, pointed rather than rounded. The eyes are somewhat large with an alert expression. The eyes are brown, blue or a mixture of the two.

The coat is short and fine. The colour is either albino or black with white spotting, referred to as Dutch markings. Because breeders have never strived to standardise the markings in the variety, there is a higher degree of variation in the white markings than in most traditional show breeds. Most Melleruds exhibit white muzzles, blazes to varying degrees, white front of chest and white frontpaws. The white may also extend to and include the sides of the face, the shoulders, the back and/or the hind legs.

== Moshtohor ==
The Moshtohor rabbit, also called the Line M rabbit, is a small rabbit that weighs 2.4 to 3.9 kg (5.3 to 8.6 lb) and originated in Egypt. It comes in yellowish-brown, white, or grey. The rabbit was founded in 2006 as a mix between the Egyptian Sinai Gabali rabbit and the V-Line rabbit. It is 39–46 cm (15–18 in) long. A special farm for the rabbits has been set up in Egypt, called the Moshtohor rabbitry farm.

== Nitransky ==
The Nitransky rabbit, also called the Rabbit of Nitra, is a medium-sized rabbit, weighing 3.5 to 5.5 kg (7.7 to 12.1 lb). Its fur comes in white and light grey.

== Orange ==
The Orange rabbit is a small rabbit weighing 2.5 to 3.2 kg (5.5 to 7.1 lb). It got its name from the color of its fur, which is a dark orange. The breed originates from Sweden, and was bred by judge Nils Jönsson in 1966. It is part of the National Orange and Fawn Rex Rabbit Association.

== Orylag ==
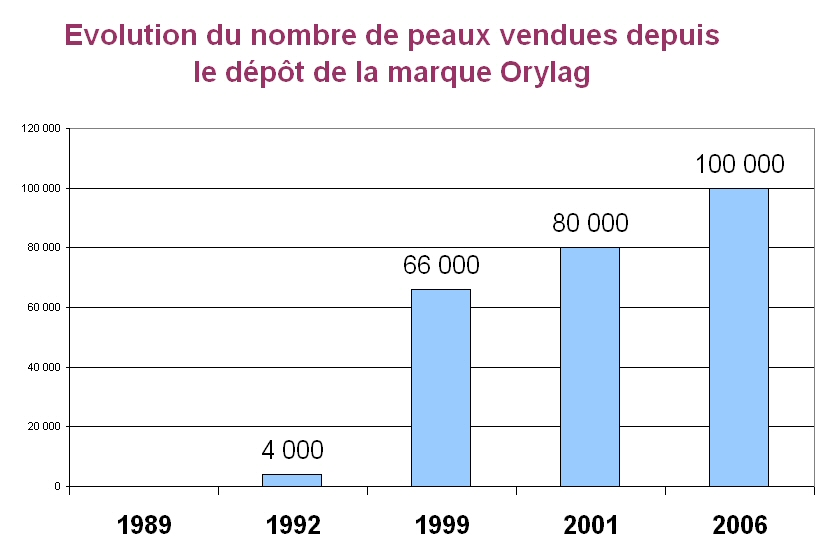
Evolution of Orylag skins produced (in French)

The Orylag rabbit, also known as the Rex du Poitou rabbit, is a breed of rabbit that was first bred in the EU and France. It weighs 2.5 kg (5.5 lb) and comes in black, white, grey, orange, and silver. It is mostly used for its fur and meat. It averages 100,000 skins per year and 120,000 kg (260,000 lb) of meat every year. The hair is also used in making textiles. The rabbit was created in 1979 by French scientists, and was big for its soft and luxurious fur. In 1990, the first breeding farm was established in Brittany, but without success. In 1992, five Orylag farms were created in Charente-Maritime area.

== Ørestad ==
The Ørestad rabbit is a small to medium-sized rabbit, that weighs 2.5 to 3.2 kg (5.5 to 7.1 lb). It only comes in white, and has ruby eyes. The breed originates from Sweden, and was created by Gunnar Carlsson who bred the breed in 1969. It was shown for the first time in Malmö in 1970.

== Pannon White ==
The Pannon White rabbit is medium-sized and weighs 2.3 to 4.5 kg (5 to 10 lb). It only comes in white. It was bred in Hungary, using a New Zealand white and a Californian rabbit. It was successfully bred in 1988.

== Miniature Plush Lop ==
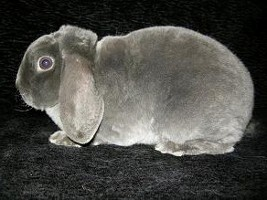
Miniature Plush Lop

The Miniature Plush Lop is a small breed of rabbit that weighs 1.7–1.8 kg (3.7–4.0 lb). The rabbit comes in blue, brown, tan, grey, white, and black. It originates from eastern Ohio in 1995 by Devie D'Anniballe, and was a mix of a Mini Rex and a Holland Lop. Miniature Plush Lops are very delicate due to their small size. Their average lifespan is 12 years. Another version of the Miniature Plush Lop was created in 2002 in Australia. It was created by Christine Toyer, who mixed a Standard Rex with a Dwarf Lop. Their fur is soft and is a low shed rabbit.

== Standard Plush Lop ==
The Standard Plush Lop is a breed of rabbit that weighs 2.3–2.6 kg (5.1–5.7 lb), and is a medium-sized rabbit. It was created by Christine Toyer in April 2015, in Australia. It was created by breeding a Dwarf Lop with a Standard Rex. Its fur is 13 mm (0.5 in) thick, and is smooth and soft.

== Rhonde ==
The Rhonde rabbit, also called the Rhön rabbit, is medium-sized, and weighs 2.5–3.2 kg (5.5–7.1 lb). It comes in gray, black, and white. It was created by Karl Becker and his son from Stadtlengsfeld, Germany, 1970 to 1973. The goal was a rabbit whose coat color resembled the trunks of birch trees. The rabbit was created when a Rhenish Piebald was crossed with a Chinchilla rabbit. It was rated rabbit breed of the year in Germany in 2012.

== Sachsengold ==
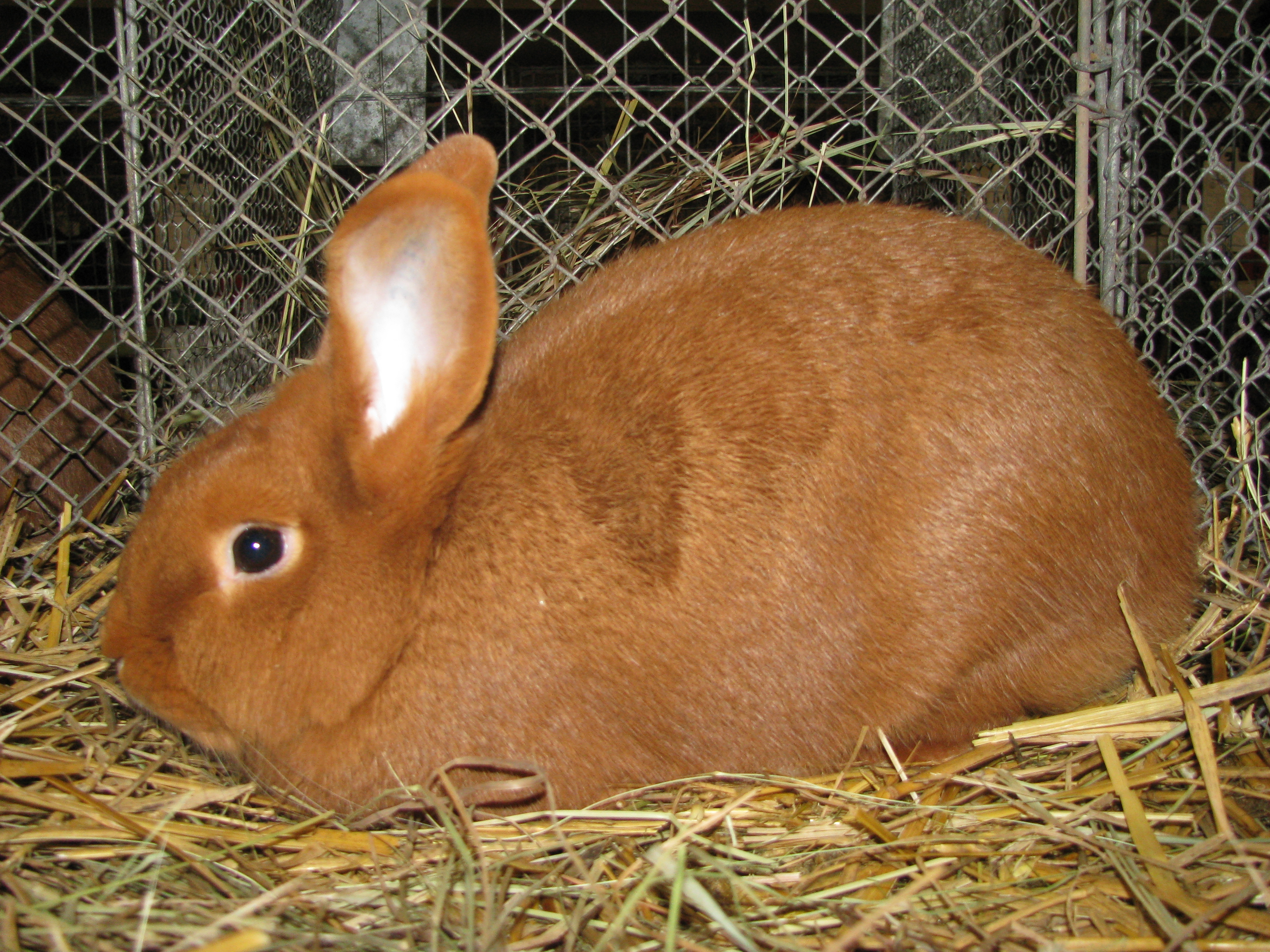
Sachsengold

The Sachsenngold rabbit, also called the Saxon Gold rabbit, weighs 2.8–3.3 kg (6.1–7.2 lb) and is a medium-sized rabbit. It comes in chestnut and red-orange. It originated from Rohrdorf, Germany, and was bred in 1925 by Richard Bennack and his son. The rabbit was first shown in 1952.

== San Juan ==
The San Juan rabbit is a small rabbit that weighs 1.4 to 2.3 kg (3 to 5 lb). It comes in a brown, chestnut, and agouti color. It was created in Washington, United States, and was a mix of Eastern cottontails. It first appeared in the 1880s. The rabbit was created naturally on San Juan Island. Around 500 San Juan rabbits live on San Juan Island, and the breed has been domesticated. The San Juan rabbit has a short lifespan of one year in the wild, and five years domesticated. The rabbits have spread to the rest of Washington mainland as well as Orcas Island.

== Simennwar ==
The Simennwar rabbit is a dwarf rabbit that only weighs 1.34 kg (2.95 lb). It was created in Egypt.

== Slovenian ==
The Slovenian rabbit is a large sized rabbit, weighing 3.0 to 5.0 kg (6.6 to 11 lb). The rabbit originated in Slovenia. It comes in tan, white, blue, yellow, brown, and grey. Patterns include pure color and spotted. It comes in both erect and lop ears.

== Spanish Giant ==
The Spanish Giant is a breed of large sized rabbit that weighs 5.7 to 6.8 kg (12.5 to 15 lb). Its primary use is meat. The breed was established in 1912 in Spain when farmers in Valencia tried to produce an animal which would provide as much meat as possible. It was created as a mix of Flemish Giant rabbits. The breed was then exported to Europe, Cuba, Argentina, and Chile. One rabbit can produce up to 15 pounds of meat. The Spanish Giant is currently in danger of extinction. Their lifespan is four to six years.

== Stone ==
The Stone rabbit is a medium-sized rabbit weighing 2.8 kg (6.1 lb). It comes in red agouti, grey agouti, and steel agouti. It is from Belgium. The rabbit was widely exported to England for its meat and almost died out. In 1934, the breed was protected by the government, and the rabbit regained numbers.

== Swedish Fur ==
The Swedish Fur is a medium-sized rabbit, weighing 3.0–3.7 kg (6.6–8.2 lb). It comes in black and white, and its fur is glossy. It was bred by Otto Christoffersson in 1923 from Helsingborg, Sweden. The Swedish Fur is Sweden's most endangered rabbit breed.

== Swedish Hare ==
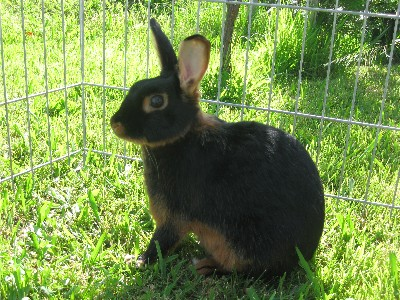
Swedish Hare

The Swedish Hare, formerly the Elfin rabbit, is a small rabbit weighing 2.3 kg (5 lb). The breed comes in white, brown, black, grey, and many others. It was developed in 2008 by Mirjam Gille and Linda Ahlsen in Sweden for its competitive jumping ability. The Swedish Hare breed specifically combines the athleticism and temperament to excel in jumping competitions, while avoiding extremes of body type, fur length, or ear length.

== Tadla ==
The Tadla rabbit is a small sized rabbit, weighing 1.8 to 2.3 kg (4 to 5 lb). It originated in 1994 in the Béni-Mellal province of Morocco, and was created for its meat. It comes in an agouti color. The population is currently 42,000 rabbits.

== Teddy Dwarf ==
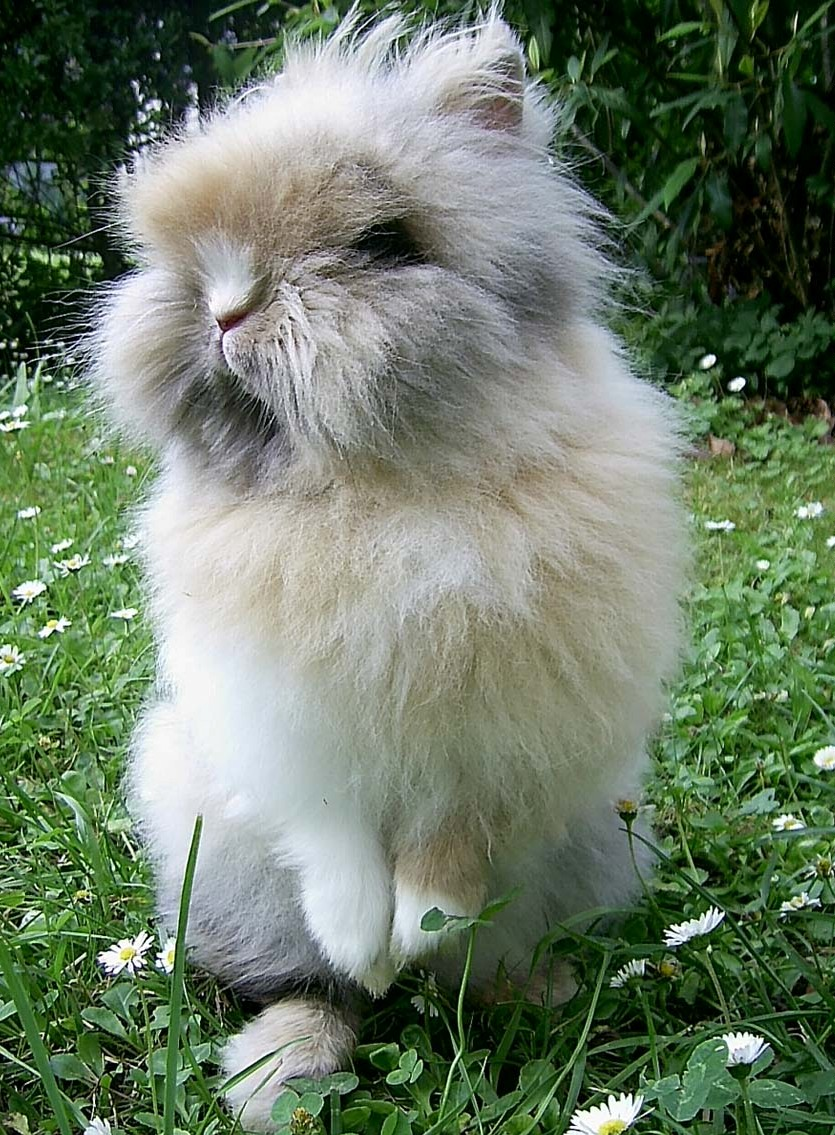
Teddy Dwarf

The Teddy Dwarf is a dwarf sized rabbit, weighing 0.82 to 1.68 kg (1.8 to 3.7 lb). The Teddy Dwarf was created in Germany in 2009. It was created by crossing an Angora rabbit and a Lionhead rabbit. The name Teddy Rabbit was created by the Teddy Rabbit Club, which was founded in Germany in 2004. Teddy Dwarfs have spread to almost all European countries beyond Germany.

== Teddy Widder ==
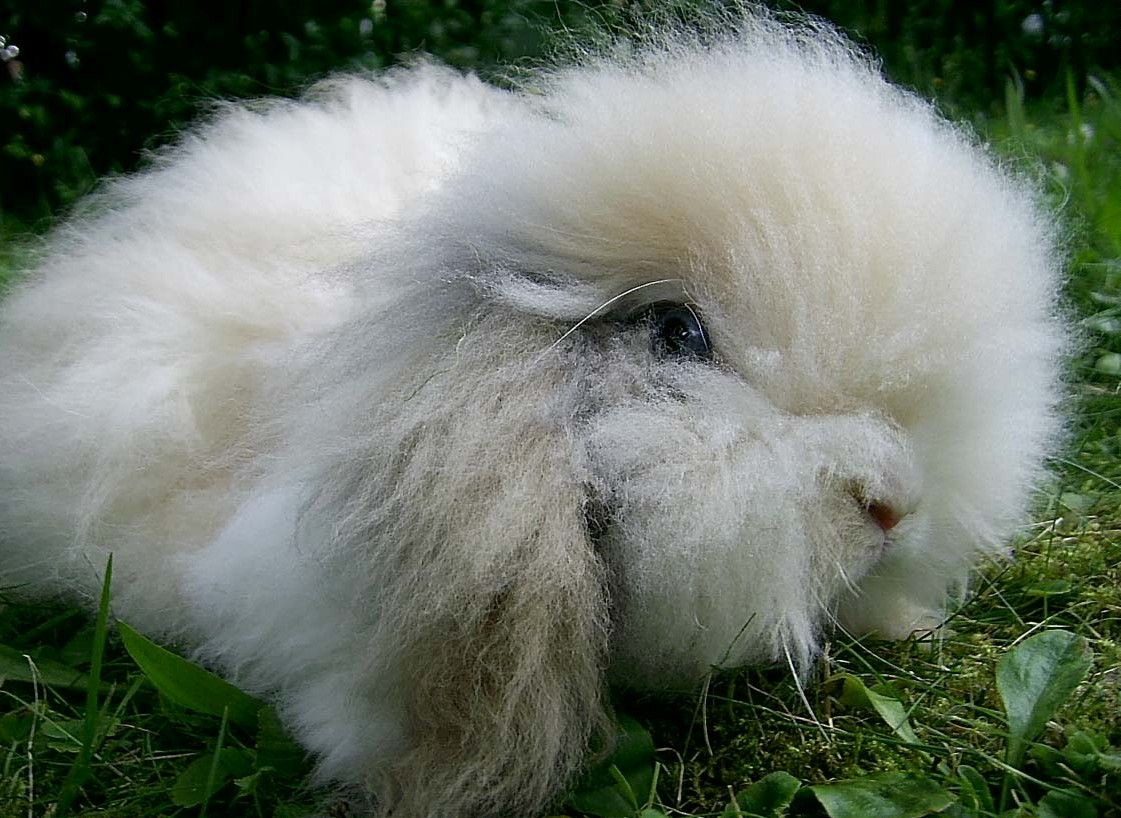
Teddy Widder

The Teddy Widder (also known as the Teddy Lop) is a dwarf-sized lop-eared rabbit breed weighing between 2.9 and 4.4 lb (1.3–2.0 kg). The breed was developed in 2019 by the Teddy Rabbit Club through selective breeding of dwarf French Angora rabbits and bearded rabbits. The breed originated in Europe and was developed to combine the wool characteristics of Angora rabbits with the lop ear trait. Teddy Widders are characterized by their compact body size, lop ears, and dense wool coat.

== Trønder ==
The Trønder rabbit, also called the Norwegian Silver Fox rabbit, is a large sized rabbit that weighs 4.0 to 6.0 kg (8.8 to 13.2 lb). Its fur comes in black and sometimes white. It was bred from 1916 to 1918 in Trondheim, Norway by T. Hannemo, who was a telephone assistant.

== V-line ==
The V-Line rabbit, also called the Line-V or Line V rabbit, is a medium-sized rabbit, weighing 3.3 kg (7.3 lb). It originates in Spain.

== Velveteen Lop ==
The Velveteen Lop is a breed of rabbit that is a cross between the Mini Rex and the English Lop. Breeder Virginia Menden began developing the breed in 1991, with the goal of creating a rabbit that had a semi-arched body shape and fur similar to that of the Mini Rex. Menden named the breed after the children's story The Velveteen Rabbit. The breed became eligible to be shown at ARBA sanctioned shows in February 2019, but is not currently allowed to compete for Best of Show. The Velveteen Lop's coat should feel shiny and plush to the touch. They are also very smooth. The coat can be a variety of colors, and color standards are similar to those of the English Lop. It should have a semi-arched body shape, and the chest should be full. The head should be wedge-shaped. The ears should be low on the rabbit's head, and should measure at least 36 cm (14 in) from tip to tip. Rabbits weigh 2.3–3.2 kg (5–7 lb). Velveteen Lops can live for 5–11 years.

== White Country ==
The White Country rabbit is a large sized rabbit, weighing 3.8 to 4.6 kg (8.4 to 10.1 lb). It originates from Denmark, and was created by Julius Schiøtt by mixing a Belgian Giant rabbit with a Danish rabbit. It only comes in white. It was first shown at Copenhagen's Tivoli in 1908.

== Zemmouri ==
The Zemmouri rabbit is a medium-sized rabbit that weighs 1.8 to 2.9 kg (4 to 6.4 lb). It comes in black, white, and grey. It was created in Morocco in the 1990s by Spanish and French missionaries, who bred European rabbit breeds.

== Zika ==
The Zika rabbit is a breed of domestic rabbit developed in Germany as a high-yielding hybrid for the meat industry. Zikas are albino rabbits (white with red eyes) that attain a weight of 3.2 kg (7.1 lb) in 84 days.

== See also ==
- List of rabbit breeds
- American Rabbit Breeders Association
- British Rabbit Council
