= Altex rabbit =

Breed of rabbit

The Altex (/ˈɔːltɛks/ AWL-teks) is a commercial breed of domestic rabbit developed, beginning in 1994, for cuniculture, specifically for the rabbit meat industry. The Altex breed is not recognized by the American Rabbit Breeders Association (ARBA) or by the British Rabbit Council (BRC).

The name Altex refers to this breed's initial development at Alabama A&M University and at Texas A&M University–Kingsville. The breed was developed from Flemish Giant, Champagne d'Argent, and Californian stock. Altex rabbits are a "Terminal Sire" rabbit and are bred for quick weight gain, as opposed to high weight gain. Bucks are bred to New Zealand does and the resulting litter go to market, on average, one week earlier than New Zealand fryers.

Altex rabbits typically weigh 13 pounds and have coat markings similar to the Californian rabbit: white with dark points on the extremities.

== See also ==
- List of rabbit breeds
