= Ren Xuping =

Ren Xuping is known as The Rabbit King in China. His farm is located in Dayi County, 50 kilometers away from Chengdu. Over 300,000 people from China, North Korea, Nepal and India have trained at his Xuping Rabbit Training School. His rabbit breeding company is worth about $1.2 million. He authored the book "One Hundred Questions on Rabbit Raising".

In 1980 at age 13 Ren bought two rabbits and in 1985 he had 200 rabbits and cooperated in building a program with Heifer International to breed rabbits and provide training for other farmers. Heifer International provided him with better breeding stock, 48 Californian and New Zealand rabbits, and technical assistance.
