= Giant Sable =

Giant Sable may refer to:

- Giant sable antelope, a subgenus of antelope
- Giant Sable rabbit, a breed of rabbit
