= Armenian Marder =

Armenian breed of rabbit

- Country of origin: Armenia
- Use: Meat

Traits
- Weight: Male: 4–4.5 kilograms (8.8–9.9 lb)
- Litter size: 7-8

The Armenian Marder is a breed of rabbit native to Armenia. It is principally raised for meat.

== History ==
The breed was established in 1940. It is the result of crossbreeding the Chinchilla rabbit, the Himalayan rabbit, and native rabbit breeds.

== Characteristics ==
Fully grown males weigh from 4–4.5 kilograms (8.8–9.9 lb), and have a body length of 50–55 centimetres (20–22 in). The average litter size is 7-8 kittens.
