= Californian rabbit =

Breed of rabbit

The Californian, also known as the California White, is a breed of domestic rabbit developed for the fur and meat industries by George S. West of Lynwood, California, starting in 1923. West maintained a herd of 300 genetically pure New Zealand Whites (with no Angora genes), which he began crossing with Standard Chinchilla rabbits for their dense coat and Himalayan rabbits (from which the Californian's markings come). This new breed, named after the state of its origin, was first shown in 1928, and a standard was accepted by the American Rabbit Breeders Association (ARBA) in 1939. Today, the Californian rabbit is the second most popular meat-producing breed in the world after the New Zealand rabbit. The fur quality allows this rabbit to also be classified as a fancy breed.

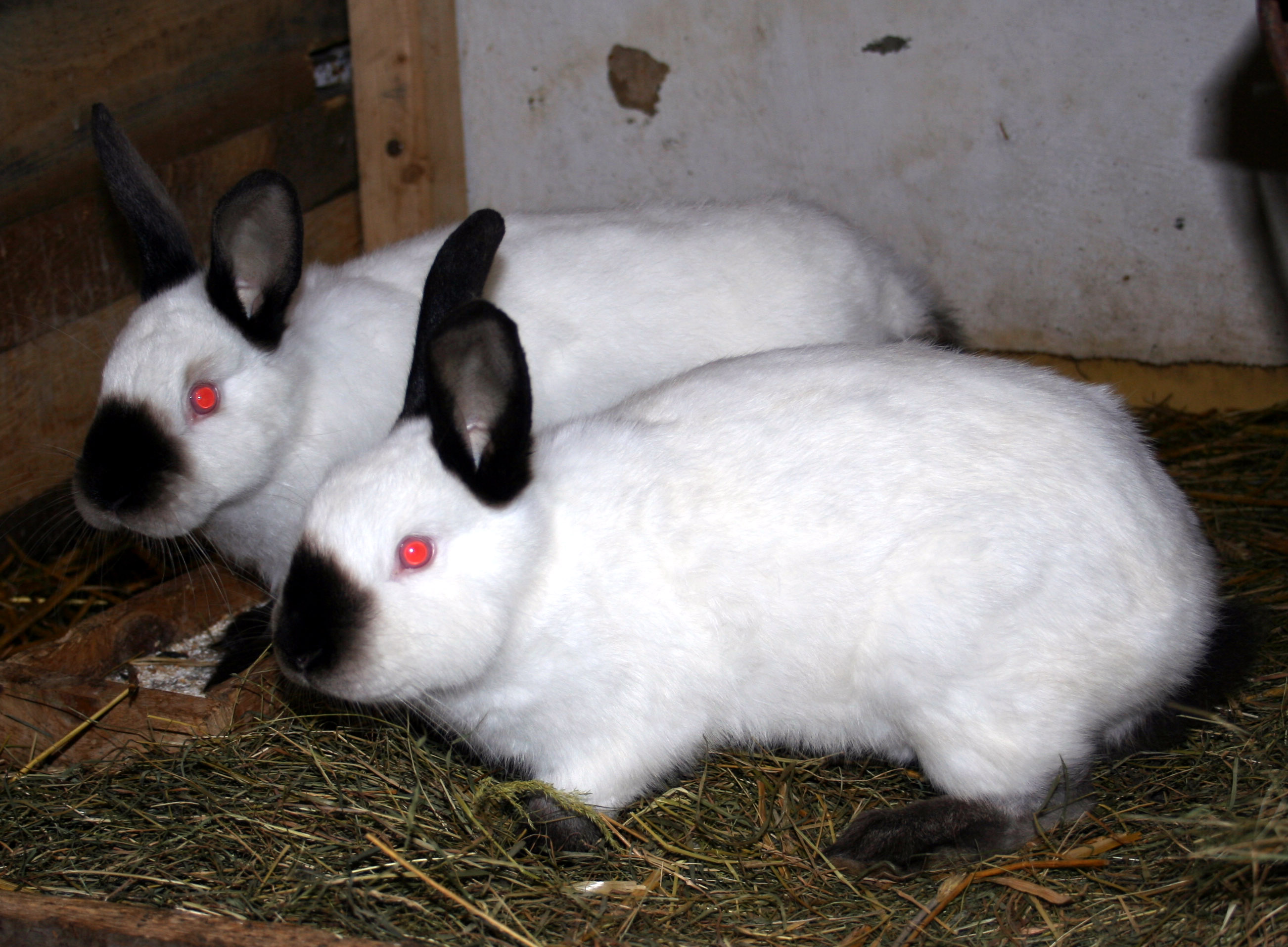
Californian rabbits
"Standard" color variety
(recognized by ARBA)

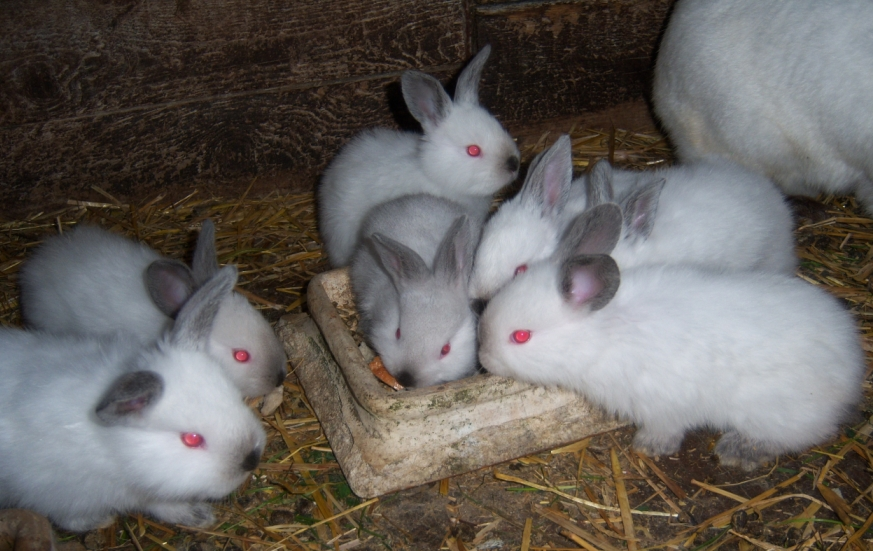
Californian rabbit kits
"blue" color variety
(recognized by the BRC)

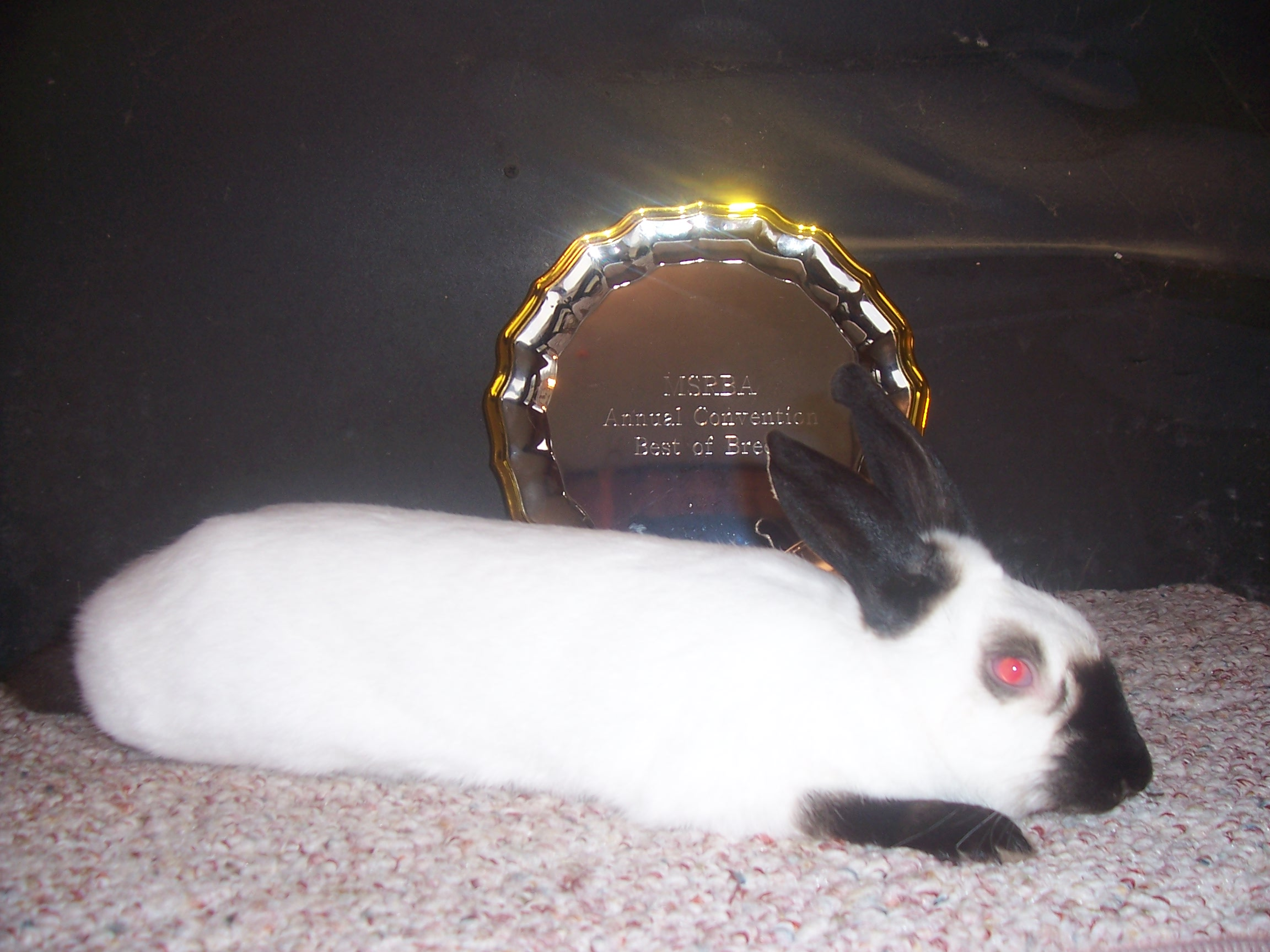
For comparison:
Himalayan rabbit
(Note the "cylindrical" body type)

ARBA recognizes only the original "standard" color variety of white with dark points, while the British Rabbit Council (BRC) recognizes four color varieties: normal, chocolate, blue, or lilac points. The BRC standard calls for a desired weight of 9.5 pounds (4.3 kg) with a minimum of 7.5 pounds (3.4 kg), while ARBA accepts a maximum weight of 10.5 pounds (4.8 kg).

Californians are an excellent meat rabbit breed, with a good meat-to-bone ratio. They produce large litters of 8-12 kits, which have a fast growth rate to fryer size (4-5lbs) in 8-12 weeks. They have dense, plush coats.

== See also ==
- List of rabbit breeds
