= Sachsengold =

Breed of rabbit

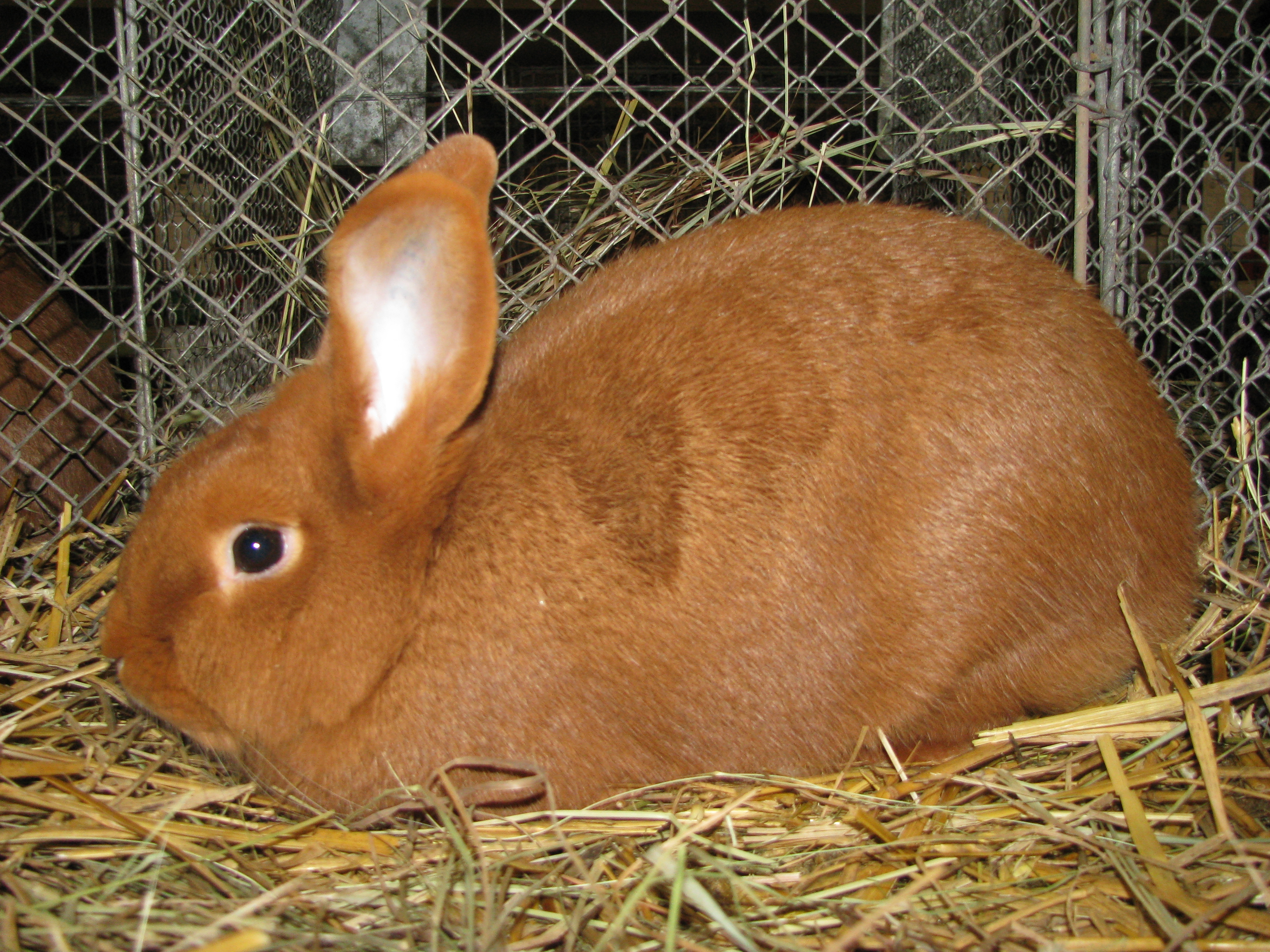
Sachsengold

Sachsengold, also known as the Saxon Gold or Gold of Saxony, is a German breed of rabbits developed in Saxony. In the German ZDRK standard it is classed among the small breeds, with an ideal weight of 2.75–3.25 kg. Its coat is described as mid-length, dense, and an intense red-yellow color, with the belly allowed to be somewhat lighter.

== History ==
Richard Bennack had discovered through a friend of his a rabbit of 'golden' color in a small litter. After he acquired this rabbit, it would need with and orange and black Harlequin rabbit resulting in yellow dominant rabbits. This breed was imported into Holland from East Germany. The secretary of the Dutch breed standards commission, Mr. Gelein, had heard of 'very nice examples' of this breed which resulted in 1968 for them to be imported into holland.

=== Smuggling into Holland ===
However this process was difficult for movement in and out of East Germany was limited. A plan was made to smuggle the breed out of East Germany was made. The government of East Germany wanted to transfer some of their soldiers for re-burial that had been killed during the Second World War. Dutch and German officials would reach an agreement which would allow for the transfer of bodies. However, these trade routes were not well controlled allowing for the breed to be smuggled inside empty coffins.
