= Argenté rabbit =

French show rabbit breed

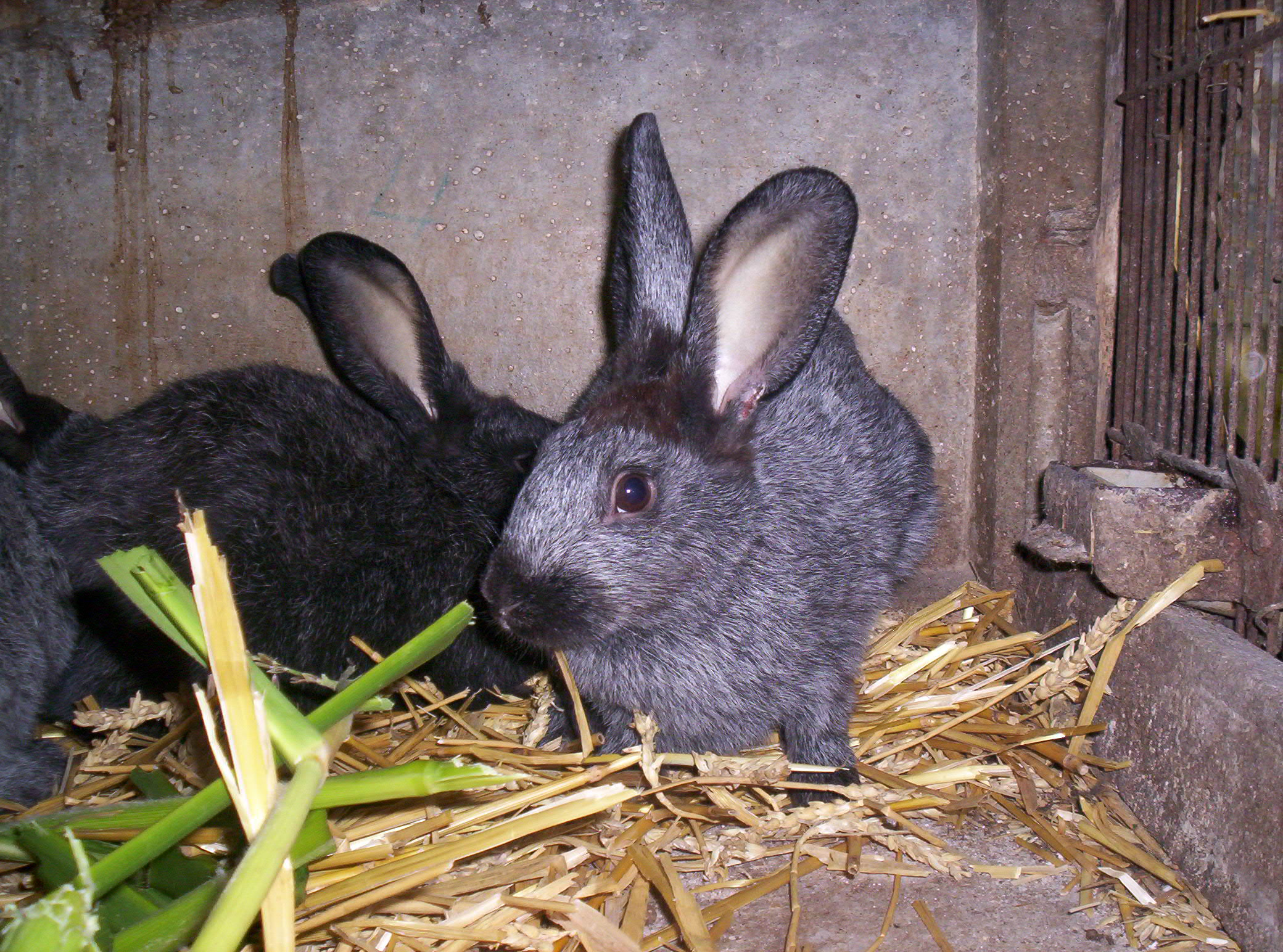
Argenté rabbits (juvenile)

The Argenté rabbit is one of the oldest breeds of French show rabbits. The British Rabbit Council (BRC) recognises six varieties: Argenté Bleu, Argenté Brun, Argenté Crème, Argenté de Champagne, Argenté Noir, and Argenté St Hubert. The American Rabbit Breeders Association (ARBA) recognises the Champagne d'Argent, the Crème d'Argent and the Argenté Brun. A rare variety, the Argenté Clair, is not currently recognised by either the BRC or ARBA.

The names of the Argenté breeds (Brun, Noir, etc.) refer not to the top-colour (which is always silver), but rather to the lower portions of the hair shaft. At birth, Argentés are of a solid color, with adult colouring beginning to show as early as six weeks and as late as four months of age. Argenté rabbits are small and neat with well-developed hind quarters and slightly arched backs. Strong traits of being cobby or racy are undesirable in Argentés. With broad heads and straight front legs, Argentés are short and fine in bone. Due to their good nature, they are known as excellent pets.

== Argenté Bleu ==
The Argenté Bleu has erect ears that are short, rounded, and proportionate in breadth. Bleus weigh approximately 2.72 kilograms (6.0 lb) and their coats, which lie close to their bodies, are very dense, glossy, and silky.

The undercolour of the Argenté Bleu is lavender blue. In shows, it is desirable for the colour to be even and moderately interspersed with longer dark blue hairs to give a distinct bluish effect when viewed from a distance. Eyes are bold and blue, and toenails are coloured.

In rabbit shows, the following are considered faults in the Argenté Bleu: dark or too long ears, too dark muzzle, and/or washy undercolour. Creamy or yellow tint (especially around the neck and cheeks), a large paunch, a bony or angular frame, or fur that is too harsh, thin, wooly, or short is frowned upon. Dewlaps in either sex are considered a serious fault. White-topped or very dark exhibits are discouraged. White toenails are a minor fault.

== Argenté Brun ==
The Argenté Brun is recognised by the BRC ["Argente Brun (UK)"] and by ARBA ["Argente Brun (US)"]. Their differences are noted below.

The Argenté Brun (UK) weighs approximately 6 pounds (2.7 kg). The BRC standard states: "Undercolour as deep brown as possible, body colour brownish-white, the whole evenly and moderately interspersed with longer dark brown hairs to give a distinct brownish effect when viewed from a distance." The coat is described as "Very dense, glossy, silky and lying close to the body. Desired length between 0.75–1.00 inch (1.9–2.54 cm)." The Argente Brun (UK) originated in England.

The Argenté Brun (US) may be a maximum of 10.5 pounds (4.8 kg). The ARBA standard states: "Surface color is to be an even silvered or frosted chocolate brown throughout. While evenness is stressed, slightly darker muzzle butterfly, ears and feet are desirable. Longer, dark brown guard hairs are to be evenly interspersed over the entire pelt. The under color is to be a rich chocolate ideally carried right to the skin." The Argente Brun (US) originated in Canada.

== Argenté Clair ==
The Argenté Clair, called Light Groot Silver in Germany, is a rare breed that is not currently recognised by the BRC or ARBA. It is similar in appearance to the Champagne d'Argent, but heavily silvered and with recessive dilute blue as an undercoat (instead of black).

== Argenté Crème (UK) ==
The breed that is recognised by the BRC as the Argenté Crème is similar to the breed that is recognised by ARBA as the Crème d'Argent

The Argenté Crème (much smaller than the Crème d'Argent) weighs approximately 2.3 kilograms (5.1 lb) and, like the Bleus and Bruns, has a very dense, glossy, silky coat that lies close to the body. Argenté Crèmes have an orange undercolour that go down to the skin and their outer color is a silver giving them a creamy complexion. In shows, it is desirable for the whole body to be evenly and moderately interspersed with longer orange hairs to give a distinct creamy effect when viewed from a distance. A white underbelly is permissible but a coloured underbelly is encouraged. Their eyes are bold and dark brown, and their toenails should be horn coloured. In shows, Crèmes follow the same guidelines for faults as Bleus and Bruns with the addition of: light soiling of the feet, ears and genital organs, bare pads, fur slightly soiled or matted, and/or long toe nails.

== Argenté de Champagne (UK) ==
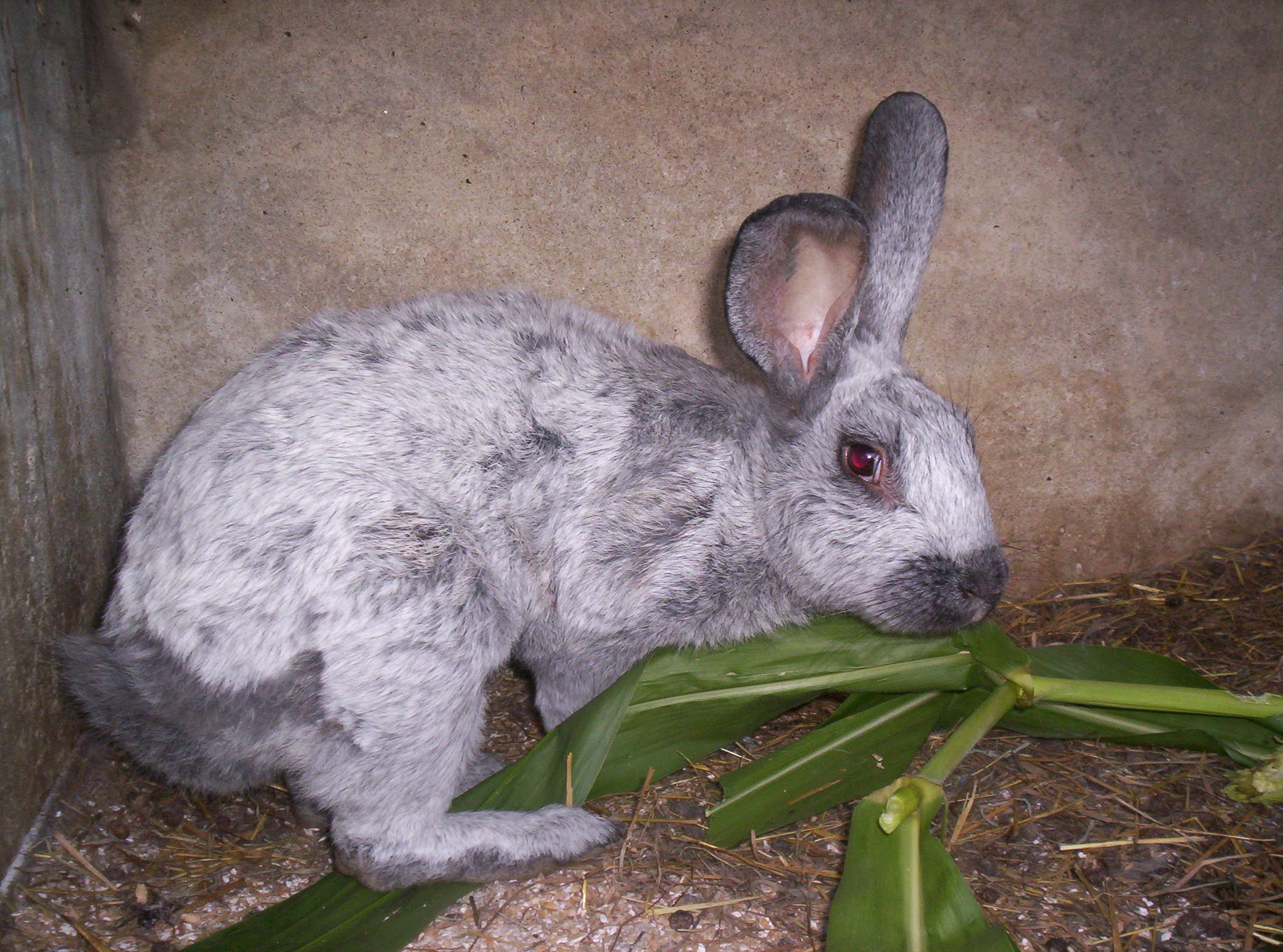
An Argenté de Champagne rabbit

The breed that is recognised by the BRC as the Argenté de Champagne is similar to the breed that is recognised by ARBA as the Champagne d'Argent.

The Argenté de Champagne weighs 4.1–5.4 kilograms (9.0–11.9 lb). Its undercolour is described as dark slate blue, with a bluish white body. It is preferred that they have long jet black hairs interspersed in their fur to create a silvery tone when viewed from a distance. It can also be all black.

In show judging, the following are considered faults: dark ears, creamy or yellow tint, especially noticeable around the neck and cheeks. A large paunch, or a bony or angular frame are discouraged. Fur should not be harsh, thin, wooly or too short. Dewlaps in either sex are a serious fault. White topped or too dark exhibits are discouraged. White toe-nails are a minor fault.

The Argenté de Champagne is one of the oldest known rabbit breeds. At that time known as the French Silver for its silvery coat, it was once prized for its pelt in spite of the fact that it was a common breed. Kits are born pure black and begin turning silver gray at about 3 weeks. By 6 months old they are typically a shade of silver grey.

== Argenté Noir ==
The Argenté Noir weighs approximately 2.72 kilograms (6.0 lb). Its coat is grayish white, with deep slate blue undertones to create a silvery effect from a distance. The eyes are a distinctive bold brown. In show judging, the following are considered faults: dark or too long ears, too dark muzzle, or washy undercolour. Creamy or yellow tint is discouraged, most noticeably around the neck and cheeks. A large paunch or bony or angular frame are discouraged. Fur should not be harsh, thin, wooly or too short. Dewlaps in either sex are a serious fault. White topped or too dark exhibits are discouraged. White toenails are a minor fault.

== Argenté St Hubert ==
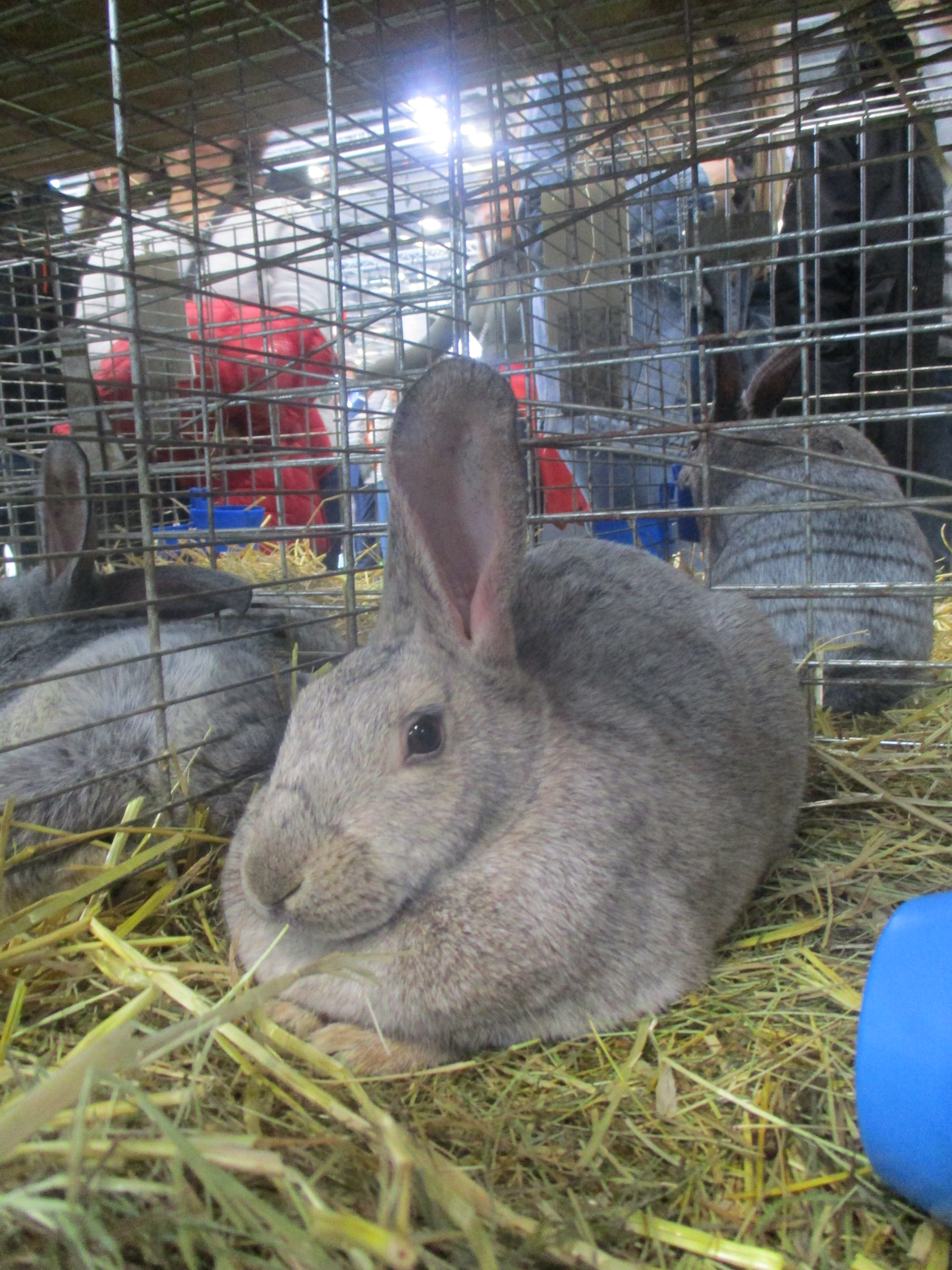
Argenté Saint Hubert

The Argenté St Hubert weighs approximately 2.72 kilograms (6.0 lb). Its under colour is dark blue at the base with an orange intermediate band with narrow top chestnut band. Body colour is creamy white interspersed with black guard hairs to give a creamy chestnut shade.

== Champagne d'Argent (US) ==
The breed that is recognised by ARBA as the Champagne d'Argent is similar to the breed that is recognised by the BRC as the Argenté de Champagne.

The Champagne d'Argent weighs 3.6–5.0 kilograms (7.9–11.0 lb). Color is described thus: "The surface color should be as near the color of skimmed milk, old silver (white/light gray with a slight dark grey tinge), as is possible. Fur over entire body should carry a liberal sprinkling of longer black guard hairs. It was to have a rich sheen and surface color that was uniform over the usable pelt, with no tinge of brassiness or foreign color."

== Crème d'Argent (US) ==
The breed that is recognised by ARBA as the Crème d'Argent is similar to the breed that is recognised by the BRC as the Argenté Crème.

The Crème d'Argent (much larger than the Argenté Crème) weighs 3.6–5.0 kilograms (7.9–11.0 lb). Its coat is "creamy-white in color with an orange cast carried throughout the fur of the body. The undercoat is bright orange and this color carries to the skin. The entire coat is interspersed with orange guard hairs."

The Crème d'Argent's origins are in France in the mid- to late-nineteenth century, where its unusual fur was quite popular. In the 1920s and 1930s, some specimens were imported to the United States from France, Germany and England. (The first rabbits of the breed were brought to the US in 1924 or shortly before.) Although the breed struggled at first, its lovely coloration appealed to American fanciers.

Today, the Crème d'Argent is a rare breed. The American Livestock Breeds Conservancy, an organization devoted to breed preservation, lists the Crème d'Argent on its "Watch" list. At the time of this writing, fewer than 100 Crème d'Argents are being registered each year in the United States. Only 43 specimens were shown at the 2006 ARBA National Convention & Show.

== See also ==
- List of rabbit breeds
