= Chinchilla rabbit =

Family of rabbit breeds

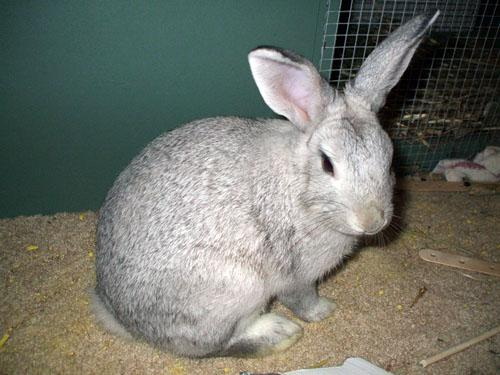
A rabbit with a chinchilla coat

Chinchilla rabbits are a group of three rabbit breeds that have been bred for a coat that resembles that of chinchillas. Despite their name, they are not related to, and cannot interbreed with, chinchillas, a genus of rodent. Rabbits, in contrast, are lagomorphs. A mutation diluted the yellow pigment in the hairs to almost white, changing in this way the color of the fur of the wild type fur (agouti) into chinchilla.

There are three breeds of Chinchilla recognized by the American Rabbit Breeders Association. Other breeds may have recognized Chinchilla varieties (such as Dutch), but the three Chinchilla breeds each have only one variety.

== Standard Chinchilla ==
- Weight: 5.5–7 lb (2.5–3.2 kg)

Standard Chinchilla is the original chinchilla version with the larger versions being developed from it. It has a compact body and rollback fur.

== American Chinchilla ==
- Weight: 9–12 lb (4.1–5.4 kg)

The American Chinchilla or "Heavyweight Chinchilla" is larger than the Standard Chinchilla, it has a commercial body type but the same roll back coat. Standard Chinchillas bred for large size produced this breed. Chinchilla Rabbits originated in France and were bred to standard by M. J. Dybowski. They were introduced to the United States in 1919. Bred to be a meat and fur rabbit, the American Chinchilla Rabbit can be shown/exhibited or kept as a stocky, hardy pet. American Chinchilla Rabbits do not require regular grooming. Adult American Chinchilla Rabbits weigh different for each sex. Males (Bucks)- 9-11#, and Females (Does) 10-12#. These stocky rabbits have a slight curve to their medium length bodies, beginning at the nape of their necks and following through to the rump. They carry their ears straight erect. The quality of the pelt is first and more important when breeding for the "Standard Of Perfection". American Chinchilla Rabbits are a six-class breed in show. (Any rabbit that matures over 9 pounds is a 6-class breed, maturation weights under 9# are 4-class breeds.) The American Chinchilla Rabbit was bred from large Standard Chinchilla Rabbits in order to produce a meatier rabbit. They were originally called Heavyweight Chinchilla Rabbits.

Junior and intermediate American Chinchilla Rabbits may be shown in age classifications higher than their own if they are overweight. Bucks and does under six months and nine pounds are considered juniors. Intermediate American Chinchilla Rabbits are bucks and does six to eight months of age. The American Chinchilla Rabbit is listed on "The Livestock Conservancy as being the only "critically endangered" rabbit at this time.

American Chinchilla Rabbits are good breeders, with an average litter of 6-9 kits.

== Giant Chinchilla ==
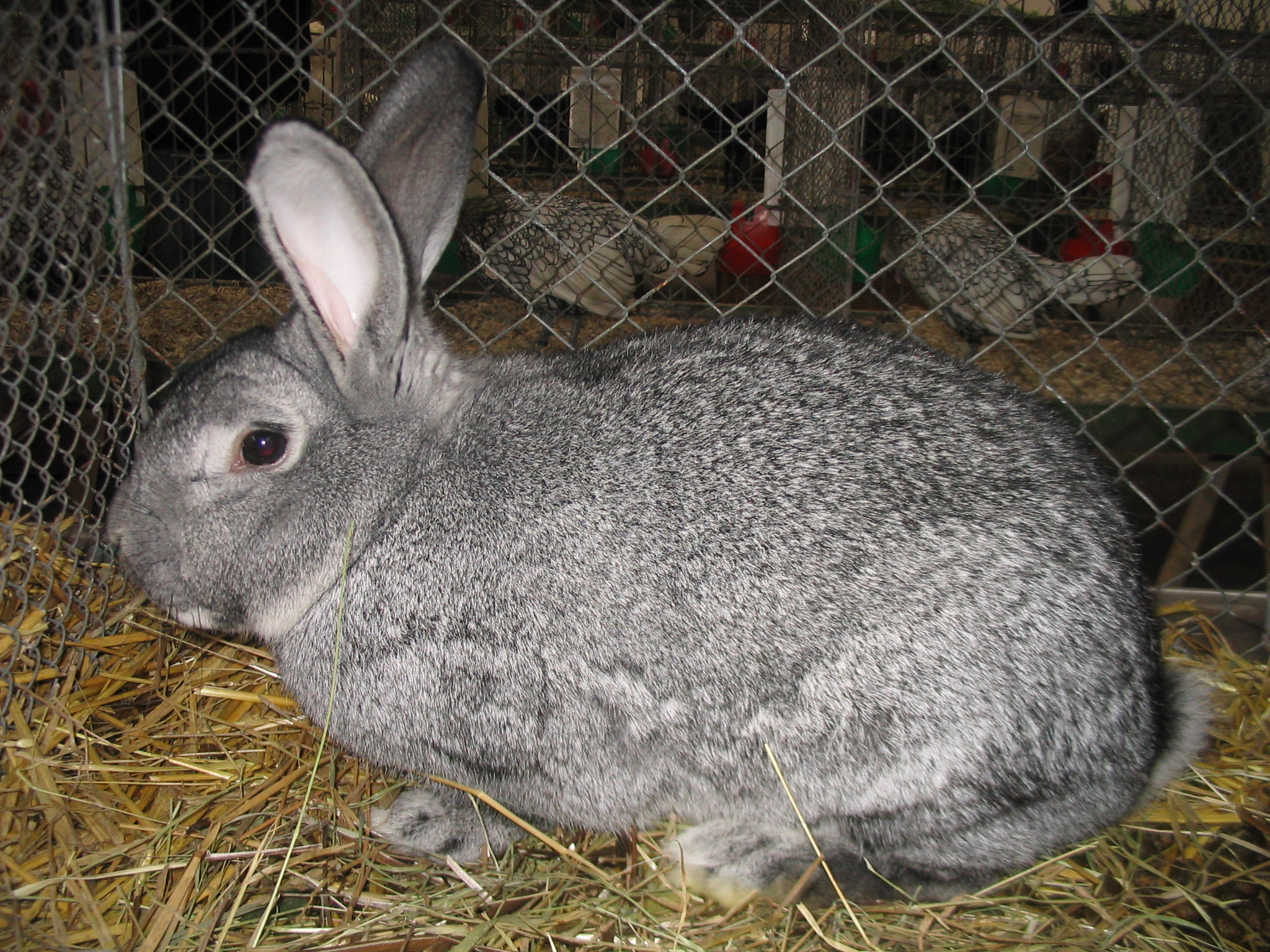
Giant Chinchilla

- Weight: 12–16 lb (5.4–7.3 kg)

The Giant Chinchilla is a result of crosses between Chinchilla and Flemish Giant breeds; it originates in the United States. This breed is used primarily as a commercial meat rabbit.

== See also ==
- Domestic rabbit
- List of rabbit breeds
- Rabbit hair
- List of types of fur
- Fur farming
- British Rabbit Council
- American Rabbit Breeders' Association
