= New Zealand rabbit =

Breed of rabbit

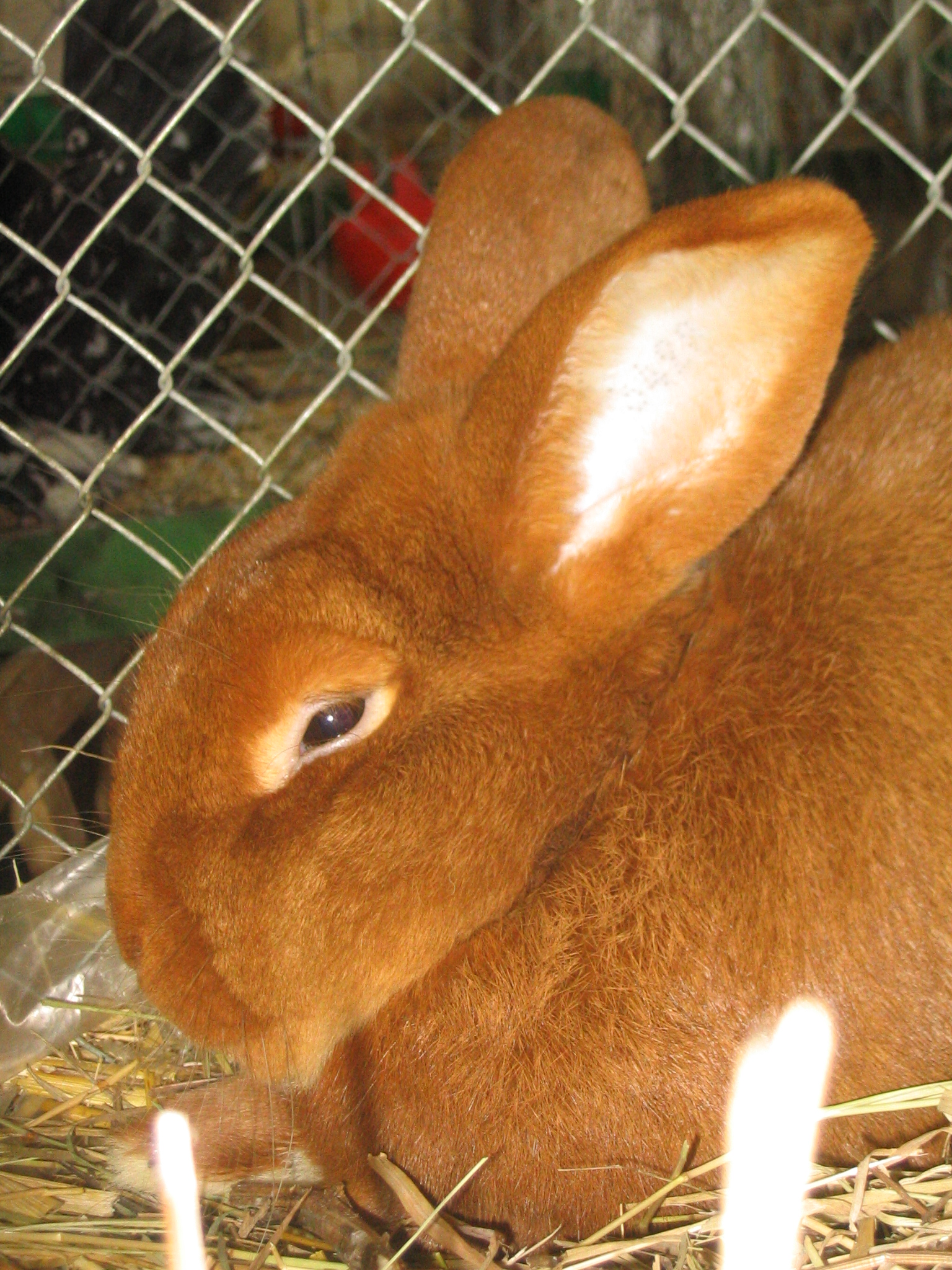
Red New Zealand rabbit

The New Zealand is a breed of rabbit that, despite the name, is American in origin. The breed originated in California, possibly from rabbits imported from New Zealand. New Zealand rabbits are available in five colors recognized by the American Rabbit Breeders' Association (ARBA): white, red, black, blue, and broken. Crossbreeding can result in other variations, such as gold tipped steel and chestnut agouti.

New Zealand rabbits average 10–12 lb (4.5–5.4 kg), with does being slightly larger than bucks. New Zealands are the most common breed used for laboratory testing and meat production, though they are also raised for pelts, show, and as pets.

== Physiology ==
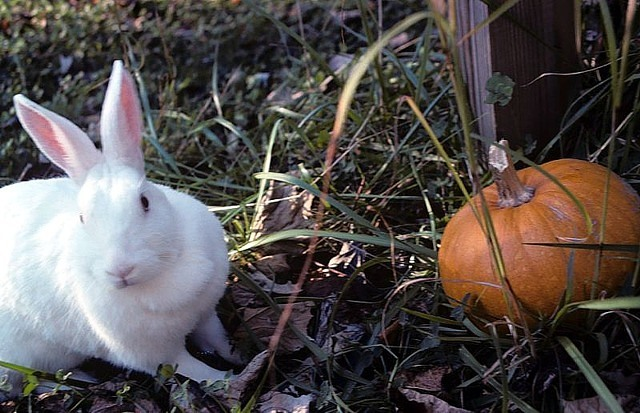
White (albino) New Zealand rabbit.

New Zealand rabbits have a broad, muscular, and deep body of medium length, with well-rounded haunches. The ears stand straight up rather than being lopped. Fur is of normal length and "flyback," which means that when brushed in the wrong direction, it immediately returns to the original position.

New Zealands are medium to large rabbits. Bucks (males) weigh 9–11 lb (4.1–5.0 kg), while the does (females) weigh 10–12 lb (4.5–5.4 kg). Female rabbits may have a dewlap, a fatty flap of fur below the chin which female rabbits sometimes use as a source of fur for lining their nest. Breeders prefer females with only a small dewlap and males that have none.

White New Zealand rabbits have a genetic deviation called albinism that results in a snowy white coat. Albinism is caused by a lack of melanin, a pigment found in most organisms. The most noticeable characteristic of white rabbits is their bright eyes, which are a ruby pink color. For this reason, they are often described as REW (ruby eyed white). REW is a recessive trait and epistatic to most other color genes in rabbits.

=== In shows ===
Though the ARBA treats all New Zealand rabbits the same, the British Rabbit Club (BRC) holds red New Zealand rabbits to a different standard.

The blue New Zealand rabbit is recognized by the BRC and in the United Kingdom. The American Rabbit Breeders Association (ARBA) has recognized blue New Zealands since late 2016. When shown in competition they are judged primarily on body type.

== Origin ==
New Zealand rabbits were likely developed in California from a mix of breeds, possibly including Belgian hares and Flemish giants. They were developed for their quick growth rate and meat type, and were added to the US rabbit standard in 1916. Originally they only came in red. The white variety was created in 1917 by William S. Preshaw out of some white New Zealands born in a litter of reds. While the reds remained more popular for meat for some time, whites quickly caught on because of their white pelt, which could be easily dyed and was more valuable in the fur market.

== Commercial use ==
New Zealand rabbits were not originally bred to be a domestic pet; they were bred for their fur and meat. Fryers are slaughtered at 8–12 weeks, and older rabbits are sold as roasters. White rabbits are preferred for fur, because it's easier to dye. The rabbits with high grades of fur are used to make fur coats and fur trimmings. The lower grades are used to make felt hats and glove linings ("Commercial Rabbit Raising"). The New Zealand is commonly used as a meat rabbit with a high feed to meat ratio with fine bones, and are considered one of the best breeds for meat production. Production rabbits are fed more protein (18-20% rather than the typical 16-18% for non-production rabbits), and sometimes alfalfa hay.

== Laboratory testing ==
New Zealand rabbits are a common choice for laboratory testing because of their docility and good health. Rabbits react similarly to humans to diseases and medications. This reaction allows them to be used at pharmaceutical laboratories, the U.S. Public Health building, cancer research centers, and university hospitals. New Zealand rabbits have been used to develop tests and drugs for diseases like diabetes, diphtheria, tuberculosis, cancer, and heart disease. The effects of skin creams, cosmetics, special diets, and food additives have also been tested on New Zealand rabbits.

== Breeding ==
A doe (female rabbit) becomes fertile between 8–12 weeks of age and can be safely bred at 5–8 months of age depending on the rabbit. Breeding before this age can cause harm or death to the doe and/or kits. Does are fertile all year long although day length can affect that some. The gestation period is around 28–35 days, although most will kindle (give birth) at 31–32 days. A nest box should be provided for the new mother two to five days prior to the expected kindling date. The doe will pull fur from her abdomen and dewlap and along with hay or other materials provided she will create a nest. The young are born hairless, deaf, and blind. Fur begins to grow in by day 3 to 5 and after 7 to 10 days the kits' eyes will open. By 2 weeks they may begin exploring and sampling outside food sources. At the age of three to four weeks their mother will begin to wean them off milk, meanwhile the kits will switch to eating hay and pellets. The average number of kits per litter is seven but commonly range from one to fourteen. Because rabbits are induced ovulators a doe can become pregnant by the simple act of mating if conditions are right. A doe can get pregnant within 24 hours after giving birth.

Cannibalism is rare but can happen. In the wild it is a defensive mechanism to remove all blood and dead tissue from the nesting area to avoid detection by predators. If young are stillborn or die after birth, the doe will often eat the remains. Cannibalism can also be prompted by a severe lack of fluids and feed. Bucks have little to no part in raising the young. They do in some cases act as babysitters and a heat source for the young kits in group settings known as a colony. Contrary to popular belief bucks do not kill and eat kits under normal circumstances.

== See also ==
- Rabbit
- Domestic rabbit
- List of rabbit breeds
