= Rex mutation =

Genetic mutation in animals, producing curled fur or feathers

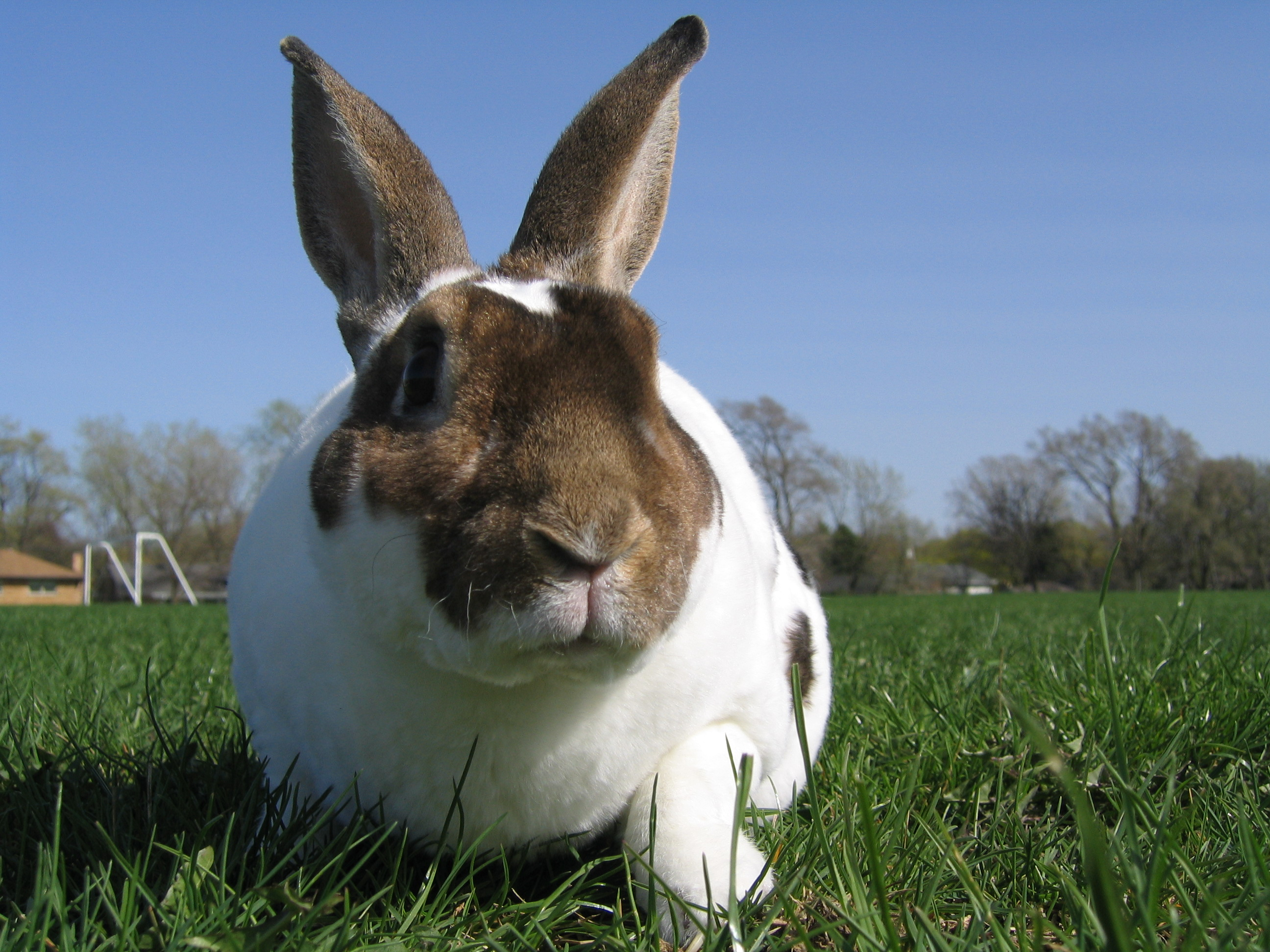
A rex rabbit

The rex mutation is a genetic variation in mammals that results in soft curly fur. These effects are due to changes in the structure of groups of hairs and cross-section of individual hairs. The rexed coats are unusual but occur (and have been preserved) in cats, rats, rabbits, horses, and dogs. The mutations, infrequent and spontaneous, occur in a variety of genes and genetic regulatory structures. The diversity of genetic factors results in variable coat thickness/density and fur length. A similar mutation can affect the feathers of birds.

== Birds ==
There are several varieties of curly-feathered domesticated birds:

- Sebastopol goose
- Frillback pigeon
- Frizzle chicken and other chickens with "frizzled" feathers.
- Curly quail

== Cats ==
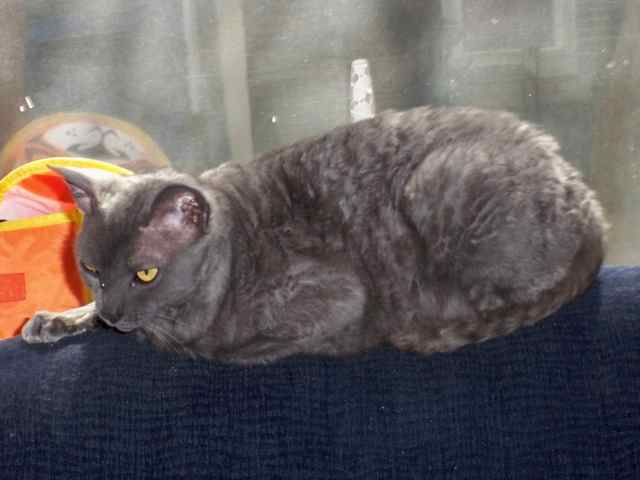
A rex cat

There are four main internationally recognised rex cat breeds: Cornish Rex, Devon Rex, LaPerm, and Selkirk Rex. Rex breeds are sometimes nicknamed "poodle cats" or "poodlecats", after the curly-coat dog breed group.

There are also a number of rarer, less well known or developing rex-coated breeds, including the German Rex, Ural Rex, Tennessee Rex, Tasman Rex group, and Skookum. Spontaneous rexed variants have also been observed in breeds such as the Maine Coon and Persian as well as in random-bred cats such as Ohio Rex, Oregon Rex, and California Rex, however there has been no significant attempt to develop or seek recognition for these varieties and most have died out. The Tennessee Rex is a natural-mutation breed of cat dating back to 2004, discovered by Franklin Whittenburg.

Rex breeds vary considerably in appearance, from the elegant slender build of the Cornish Rex to the larger, cobby and heavy-boned Selkirk Rex. Each results from a separate mutation rather than being bred from a common ancestor. Each mutation causes the hair follicles to be oval in shape, instead of the normal regular round form, which results in hairs curling round as they grow instead of growing straight. Many of the other spontaneously occurring rex mutations have occurred and some have proven to be the same gene as the main four breeds. Some of those mutations, such as the Dutch Rex, were found to have unmanageable or unattractive fur and were not pursued as breeds.

The name rex was taken from the rabbit fancy because the first rex cat breed to be developed, the Cornish Rex, has a coat similar to that of a rex rabbit, in that it comprises only the undercoat with no topcoat or guard hairs.

=== Named mutations ===
- 1930s: Karakul Cat. Occurred in the US and was recorded as a novelty, but not developed as a breed.
- 1930s: Prussian Rex. Discovered in Königsberg in what was East Prussia in the early 1930s. This rex-coated brown tomcat was named "(Kater) Munk" and has been linked to the later German Rex as he was allowed to mate freely with local cats until his death 1944. His offspring were not recorded.
- 1944: Ohio Rex. First occurrence of rex-coated cat in Ohio, US
- 1950s: Buckfast Blue (Buckfast Rex). Locally occurring variety in Devon, England, feral forerunner of Devon Rex
- 1946 and 1951: German Rex. Rexed cats occurred on several occasions in different parts of Germany and some have been anecdotally linked to Kater Munk. They arose in Berlin, Essen and Sieburg, but it was the Berlin strain that gave rise to the modern German Rex.
- 1950: Cornish Rex. The British/European style of cat is sufficiently different from the breed in North America that the latter is also referred to as "American Cornish Rex" to differentiate it and to accommodate the different breed standards.
- 1950: Italian Rex. Three rex-coated kittens were born to a straight-haired female, but these were not pursued as a breed.
- 1953: Ohio Rex. Second occurrence of rex-coated cat in Ohio, US. At least 4 such cats were born, but this variety lasted only 10 years with no serious attempt at creating a breed.
- 1959: Oregon Rex. A wavy-coated bicolour female kitten was born to a straight-haired mother and named "Kinky Marcel". Test-matings with proved it to be a recessive mutation incompatible with the Cornish Rex or Devon Rexes so it was not pursued as a breed.
- 1959: California Rex (Marcel Cat). A rex-coated tortoiseshell female called "Mystery Lady of Rodell" and her rex-coated red tabby son were bred together and resulted in further curly-furred semi-longhair cats. Test-mating found this to be compatible with the Cornish Rex so the Marcel Cat was used to expand the gene pool of Cornish Rexes in the US.
- 1960: Devon Rex Curly-furred cats had existed in the area for a number of years and were known locally as "Buckfast Blue" because of their grey fur. These predecessors of the Devon Rex are also retrospectively referred to as "Buckfast Rex".
- 1968–9 and 1985: Dutch Rex. The first occurrence was in Zaandam in 1968 or 1969 when a female cat produced a rexed daughter. The daughter produced rexed offspring when mated to unrelated straight-haired males, including Siamese cats, demonstrating this to be a dominant mutation. The fur tended to form dreadlocks and had a coarse, unruly texture. The cats were also prone to balding. Cat fanciers believed the strain originated from an American Wirehair belonging to military personnel. The mutation reappeared in 1985 and was also known as the Wirehair Rex. These cats were traceable as descendants of the discontinued Dutch Rex breeding program. The last known Dutch Rex was a female cat of unknown origin found in Amsterdam in the late 1990s. The dominant mutation produced a rex type of coat in the heterozygote and a sparse coat in the homozygote.
- 1972: Victoria Rex. A curly-furred cat named Tuoh was found in the Victoria area of London. The fur was different from the Devon Rex and the cat was to have been test-mated to a Cornish Rex. The outcome of test-matings appears not to have been recorded.
- 1979: Sieburg Rex. A spontaneously occurring rex-coated bicolour male cat originally named Pushkin, and later renamed Kater Preu, was used in the German Rex breeding programme. He turned out to have a different mutation to the Berlin cats, and produced straight-haired offspring when mated to them, so he was neutered.
- 1982: LaPerm
- 1987: Selkirk Rex
- 1988 and 2002: Maine Waves/Rexed Maine Coon. Originally occurred in British breeding lines in the 1980s and caused controversy as the GCCF rules do not allow for spontaneous mutations to be registered as separate breeds. Test matings with Devon Rexes and Cornish Rexes were inconclusive. Test-matings indicated that the mutation was either recessive or incomplete dominant gene and did not result from mis-mating of a Maine Coon to either of those breeds. Accusations of mis-mating and unhealthy cats persisted. In the 1990s, Rexed Maine Coons (and carriers of the mutation) were neutered to avoid spreading the unwanted gene. In 2002, several Rexed Maine Coons were born in New York, US. Although blamed on the effects of the 9/11 attack, it was more likely due to the rex mutation being in the gene pool.
- 1990s: Dakota Rex. There were plans to establish this as a breed.
- 1990s: Missouri Rex. The mutation was found to be different from the Devon Rex and Cornish Rex mutations and it was planned to establish this asa breed. Financial problems led to most of the cats being euthanized.
- 1991: Urals Rex. Although not recognised until 1991 by the emerging cat fancy in Russia after glasnost, the Urals Rex had been reported in and around Yekaterinburg since the Second World War. There were two breeding populations carrying the same mutation which was known to be different from the German/Cornish Rex rex mutation. By 1991 the cats were greatly inbred and work was needed to expand the gene pool.
- 1994: Bohemia Rex/Czech Curly Cat. Although not recognised until 1994, this longhair rex of Persian conformation has existed in Liberec, The Czech Republic since 1981. It arose when curly kittens were born in a pedigree Persian litters. The parents were traced back to two blue Persian males imported from Germany in the 1970s. These males may have inherited a spontaneous mutation or may have carried the German Rex mutation due to Persian cats being used in the German Rex breeding program and some of the straight-coated offspring being registered as Persians. Test-matings found that only some Bohemia Rexes have the Cornish (German) Rex mutation and that there is an unknown second rex-causing gene involved. There was little interest in this variety until after the recognition of the Selkirk Rex Longhair.
- 1994: Poodle Cat (Pudelkatze). A German variety, now possibly extinct due to German legislation, developed from the Scottish Folds and Devon Rexes
- 1998: Skookum (previously LaMerm). A breed developed in the US. from LaPerms and Munchkins
- 1998 and 2003: Tasman Manx (also nicknamed Manx Rex). A spontaneously occurring rex-coated Manx cat. This arose spontaneously in pedigree Manx lines in Australia and New Zealand, not from crossbreeding. Test-matings to Devon Rex produced only straight-haired kittens. The fur also appears different from the Cornish Rex mutation, but test-matings are required. Curly-furred Manx cats were all traceable to an outcross mating (to widen the Manx gene pool) in Australia which used a cream Persian male from European bloodlines. It is suggested that these may, therefore, be related to some Bohemia Rex cats.
- 1998: Australian Rex. Arose in 1998, but not reported until 2005. Cats with coats similar to Cornish Rexes occurred in non-pedigree litters in an area where there were no known Cornish Rex cats. The cats were small and litter sizes were typically 1 or 2 kittens. Breeding was not controlled and many of the cats disappeared or were neutered, leaving only one breeding male. Cat breeding is not encouraged in Australia and this variety may now be extinct.
- 2001: Iowa Rex. A male cat sired curly-coated kittens, including dreadlocked longhairs, in several litters. The Iowa cats were large and muscular with notably broad muzzles. Their discoverer was seeking an experienced breeder to take these on as a developing breed.
- 2001: Ruffle. This combined the American Curl's ear type with the Cornish Rex fur type, but was not further developed under this name. There are differing accounts as to whether it occurred spontaneously or through deliberating crossbreeding.
- 2003: Brooklyn Wooley. Several "Wirehair Rexes" were born in Brooklyn, New York, US, but did not survive. Subsequent litters born to the same parents survived and are being developed into a new breed. Kittens may be born partly bald or go through a bald phase before developing the curly coat. It was initially thought to be identical to the short-haired LaPerm, but was later found to be a new recessive mutation.
- 2003: Prairie Rex. Rexed cats were found at a farm in Saskatoon, Canada and had been breeding freely for around 10 years. Several cats were taken on by a breeder, but were badly inbred resulting in poor health. They were traceable to a chocolate point rexed male and the line appears to have died out. The last of the line were neutered due to their poor health.
- 2003: Hoosier Rex. A curly-haired female and 4 curly-haired kittens were found in Indianapolis and given to an animal shelter where they were all neutered. The animal shelter had received similar cats over the previous two years. The mutation cannot be researched due to a legally binding neutering rule.
- 2004: Tennessee Rex (T-Rex). Two curly-coated were taken in by a Chattanooga cat-lover who was sufficiently impressed by their appearance to pursue this as a new breed. In addition to their curly fur, many of the cats had a "satin" or "glitter" mutation resulting in glittering fur.
- 2009: Helki. Developed in California from South Sacramento feral cats with a semi-rexed coat. The silky or fleecy coat contains a mix of straight and wavy guard hairs and it appears to be a dominant mutation. the name means "touch" in the Miwok language.
- 2015: Australian Satin. Kim Gale discovered a litter of 4 rex satin domestic cats in Queensland Australia. The breed is being Pursued By Kim Gale, the Hair is silky with a sparkle, so far looks best on red, but other colours are being explored. Genetically it is a recessive mutation.

== Dogs ==
- Curly-coated dog breeds
  - Curly-coated Retriever
  - Irish Water Spaniel
  - Lagotto Romagnolo
  - Poodle breed group

== Horse ==
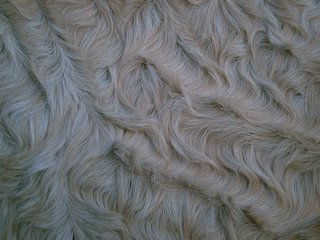
Closeup of American Bashkir Curly horse coat in winter

- American Bashkir Curly horse

== Pig ==
- Mangalica pig

== Rabbits ==
A great variety exists within rex rabbits. They vary from very dense and short-haired varieties (Standard Rex) to long-and-curly-haired breeds (Astrex).

The rex rabbit was introduced in 1919 by Abbe Gillet from a spontaneous mutation. The next rex rabbit was discovered in the hutches of a breeder in Lübeck, Germany in 1926. This breed was originally called Deutsch-Kurzhaar and is due to the r2 (dek) gene. In 1927, yet another short-hair rabbit was discovered in the hutches of the French breeder Madame Du Bary, a fancier of Himalayan (ch-) rabbits. This breed was called Normannen-Kurzhaar and is due to the r3 (nok) gene.

Of the three genetic sources of rex rabbits, the one due to the gene r1 is the most popular with fanciers and has the simple Mendelian inheritance pattern of autosomal recessive. It was not linked with any other genes known at the time although it was eventually found to be in the same linkage group as r2.

The phenotype of r1 and r2 is a completely normal coat but r1 or r2 alone produces a short coat with curly whiskers. Although the phenotypes are identical for each gene, the linkage distance was eventually worked out. The gene r3 is independent of r1 and r2 in breeding tests so they fall on different chromosomes.

The mutation associated with r1 was recently studied using modern genetic tools. A deletion of a single nucleotide was found in LIPH (lipase member H gene) of rex rabbits. In humans, this gene is associated with alopecia (hair loss phenotypes). This mutation results in a frameshift that causes the mRNA transcription machinery to sense the end of the gene prematurely. The stop codon generated by the deletion may be shortening the protein by 19 amino acids. The exact mechanism was not determined but the deletion is necessary and sufficient for the rex phenotype.

== Rodents ==
=== Guinea pigs ===
- Rex Guinea Pig
- Texel Guinea Pig
- English Merino Guinea Pig

=== Hamsters ===
Rex golden hamsters first appeared in the 1970s, characterised by curly whiskers and a curly coat; the curls in the coat are easily visible in short-coated hamsters but more difficult to see in long-coated ones.

Rex in Campbell's dwarf hamsters is not recorded as to when it first appeared. Unlike with golden hamsters, the rex coat in Campbell's dwarfs is commonly very sparse and gives a bald appearance. The whiskers are curled.

=== Mice ===
- Rex mouse
- Astrex mouse
- Texel mouse

=== Rat ===
- Rex rat
