= Devon Rex =

Breed of cat

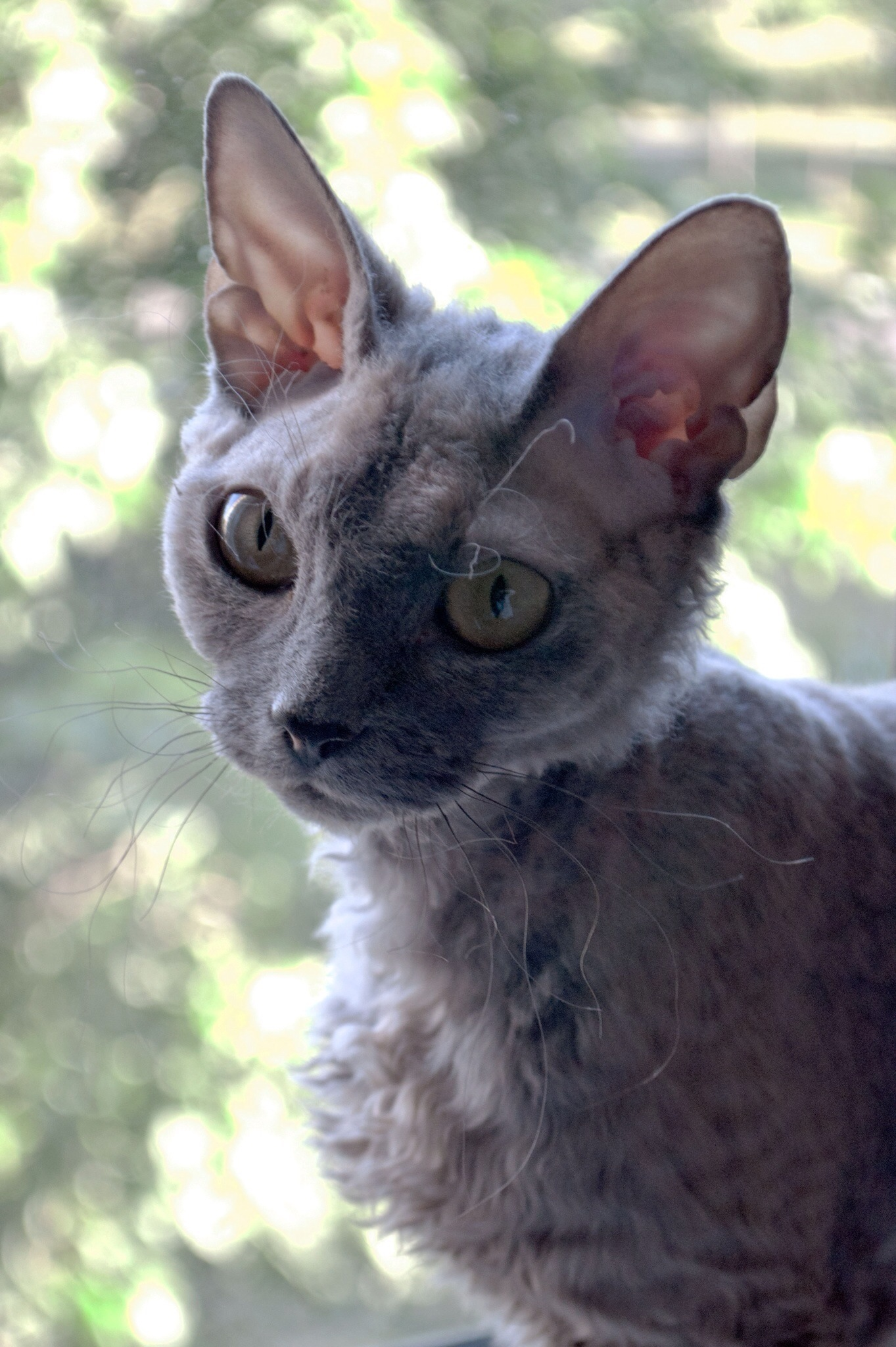
- Origin: England

Breed standards
- CFA: standard
- FIFe: standard
- TICA: standard
- ACF: standard
- ACFA/CAA: standard
- CCA-AFC: standard
- GCCF: standard

The Devon Rex is a tall-eared, short-haired breed of cat that emerged in England during the late 1950s. The breed is known for its atypical appearance, with an oddly shaped head, large eyes, and the short and wavy coat.

== History ==
=== Origin ===
Beryl Cox came across a novel curly-coated kitten in Buckfastleigh, Devon in 1960 whom she decided to name Kirlee. Originally, Cox believed the cat's gene to be related to the Cornish Rex which led to her breeding Kirlee with Cornish Rexes. However, when the queen gave birth the kittens all had straight coats, which led to the discovery that Kirlee had a different mutation than Cornish Rexes. Following this Cox began a breeding program to try to preserve Kirlee's unique mutation.

== Appearance ==
The Devon Rex is a very short haired breed with a medium build and a unique head type which gives the breed a 'pixie-like' appearance. The head is short with a broad wedge and the brow curving to a flat skull. The eyes are large, set wide, and oval-shaped. Devon Rexes may have any eye colour. The ears are large and set wide apart with rounded tips. The coat is short, dense, soft, and curls inwards, giving it a waved or rippled effect. Some areas of the body such as the neck may lack enough fur for the wave/ripple effect. The whiskers and eyebrows are crinkled and twisted. Devon Rexes may come in any colour.

== Health ==
Hereditary myopathy is found in some Devon Rexes. It is caused by a genetic variant known as COLQ and it appears anytime from 3 to 23 weeks of age. Typically, there is a chance that the myopathy in the cats might stabilize, however, most of the time, the condition worsens and the Devon rex cats die from laryngospasm, after obstructing their larynx with food.

The Devon Rex was found to be predisposed to feline atopic dermatitis in a retrospective study of cases of the disease.

The Devon Rex is predisposed to congenital hypotrichosis and Malassezia dermatitis.

== Gallery ==
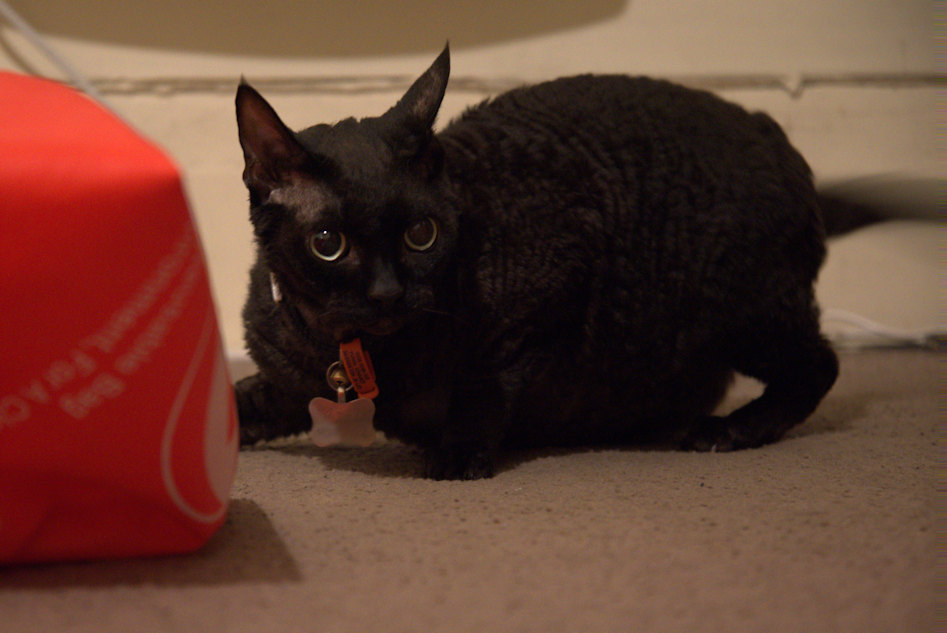
A black Devon Rex.

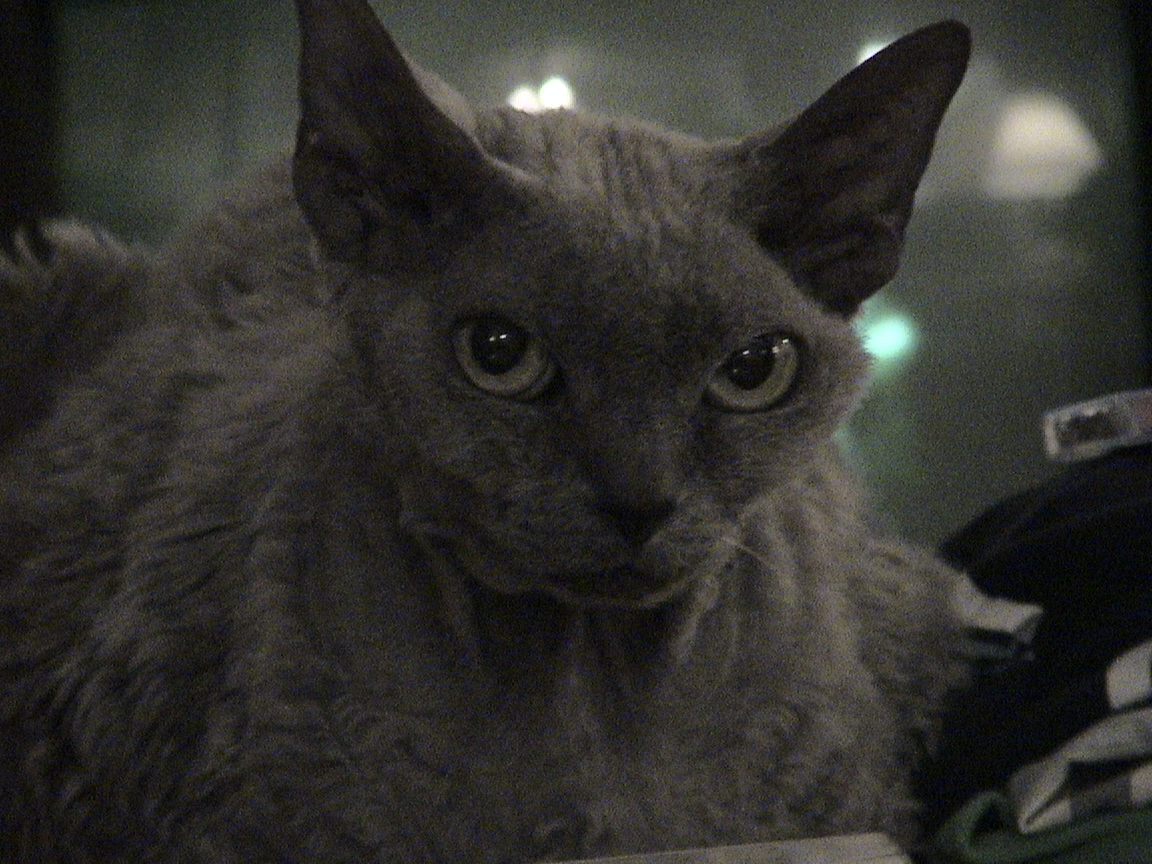
A "blue smoke" Devon Rex with unusually large ears.

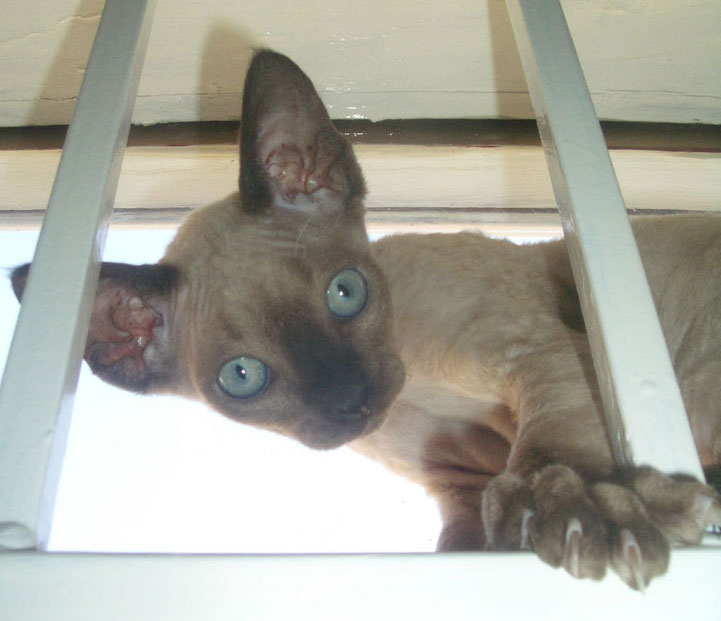
Devon Rex cats with Siamese (colourpoint) colourings are known as Si Rex.

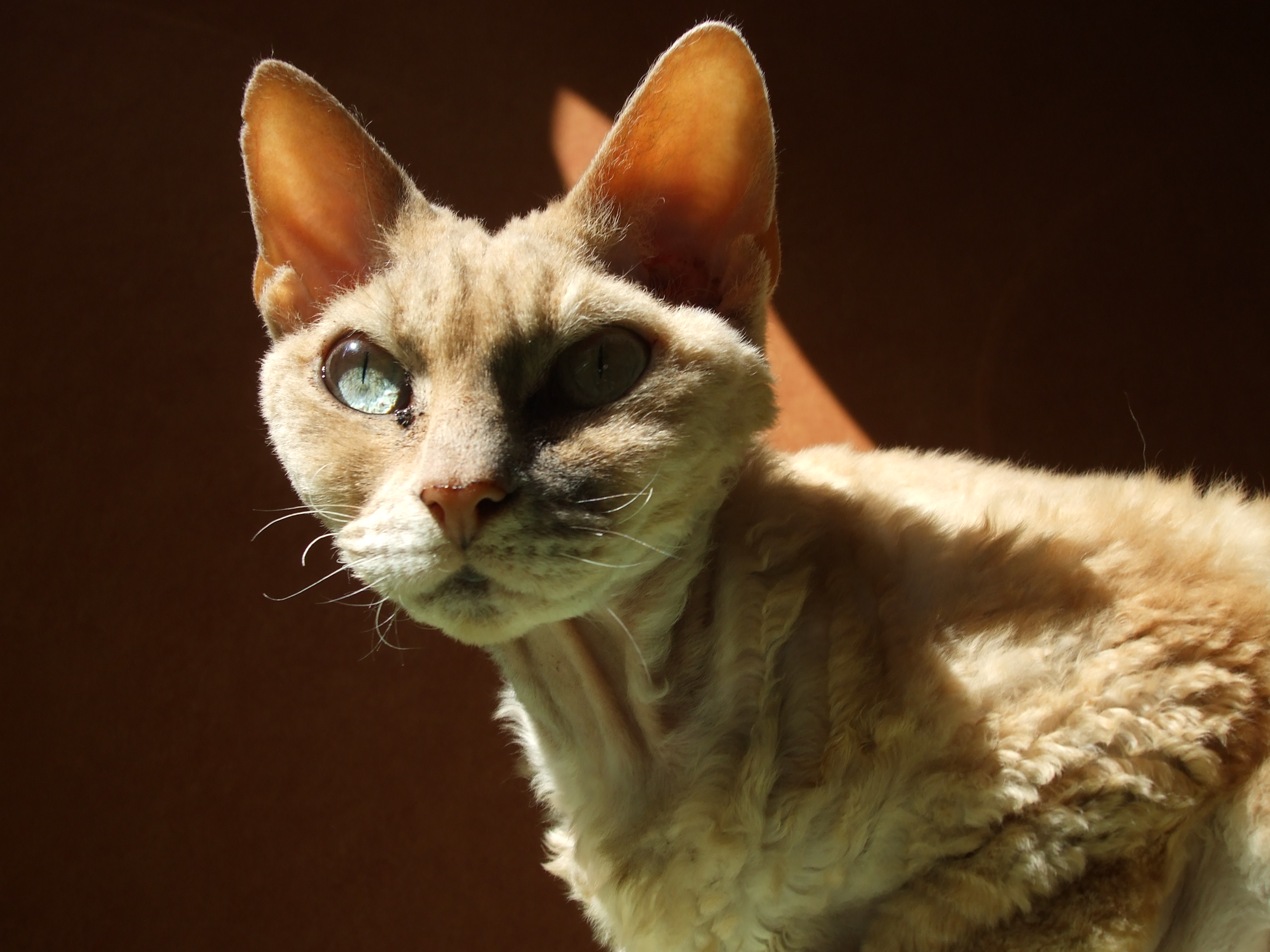
A cream Devon Rex with curly, soft coat typical to this breed

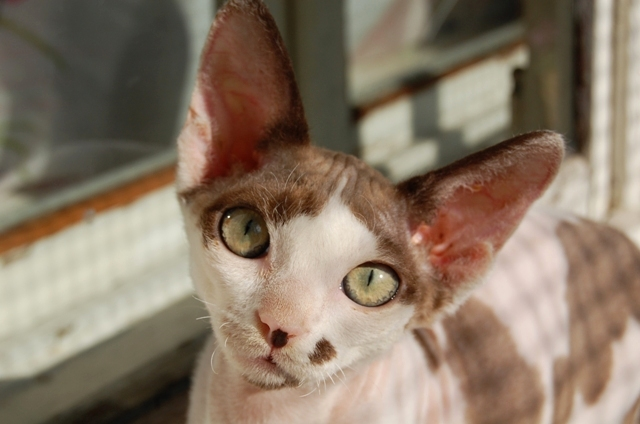
A Devon Rex with white spotting on a chocolate coat

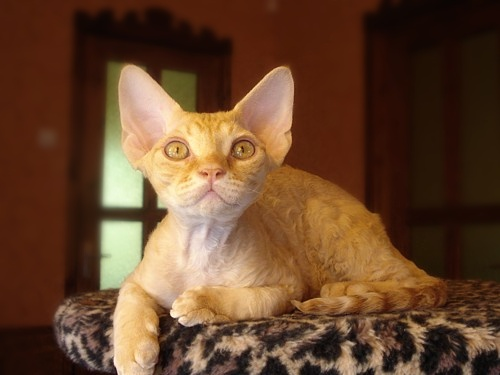
An orange Devon Rex

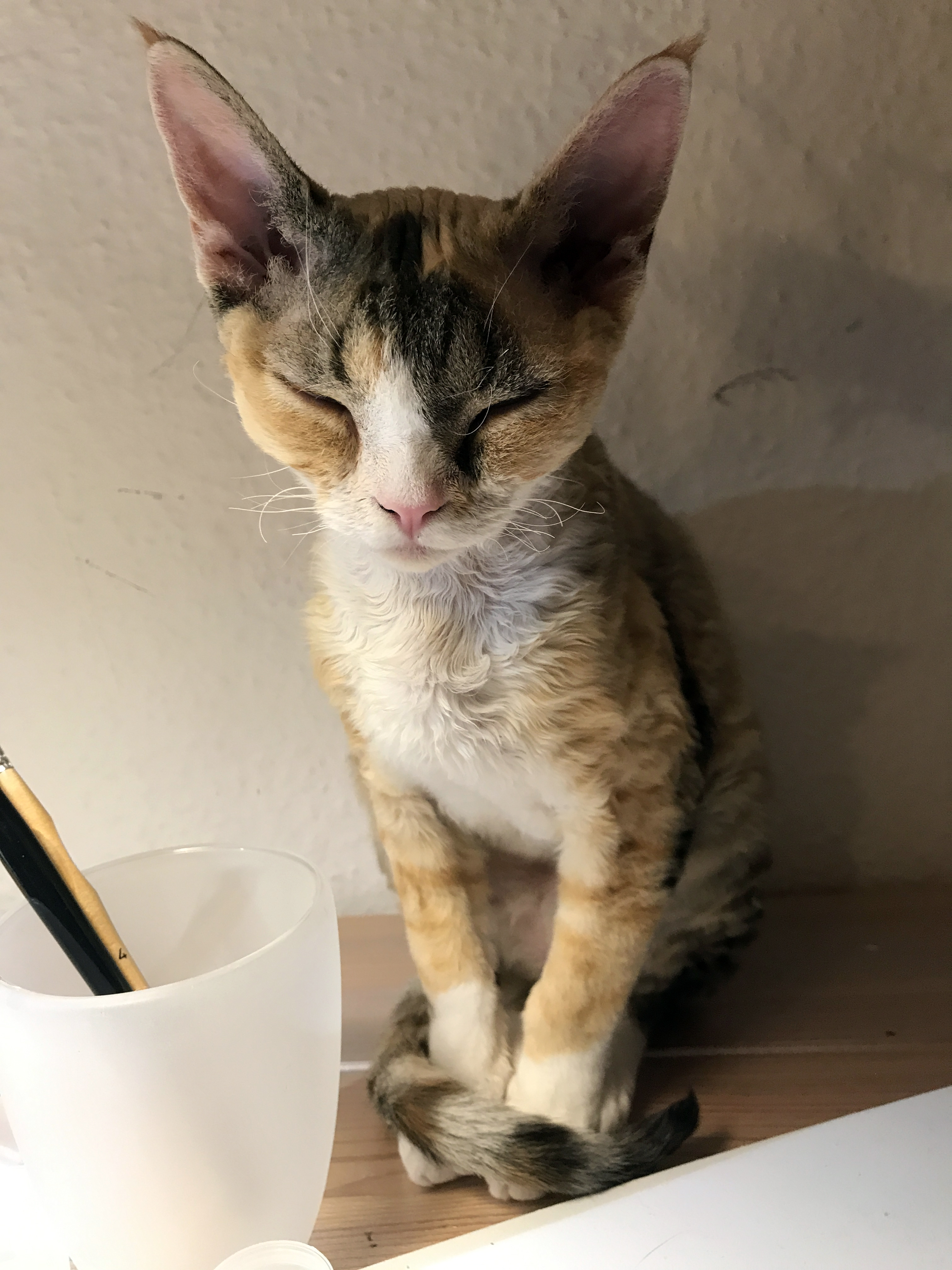
A tortoiseshell Devon Rex

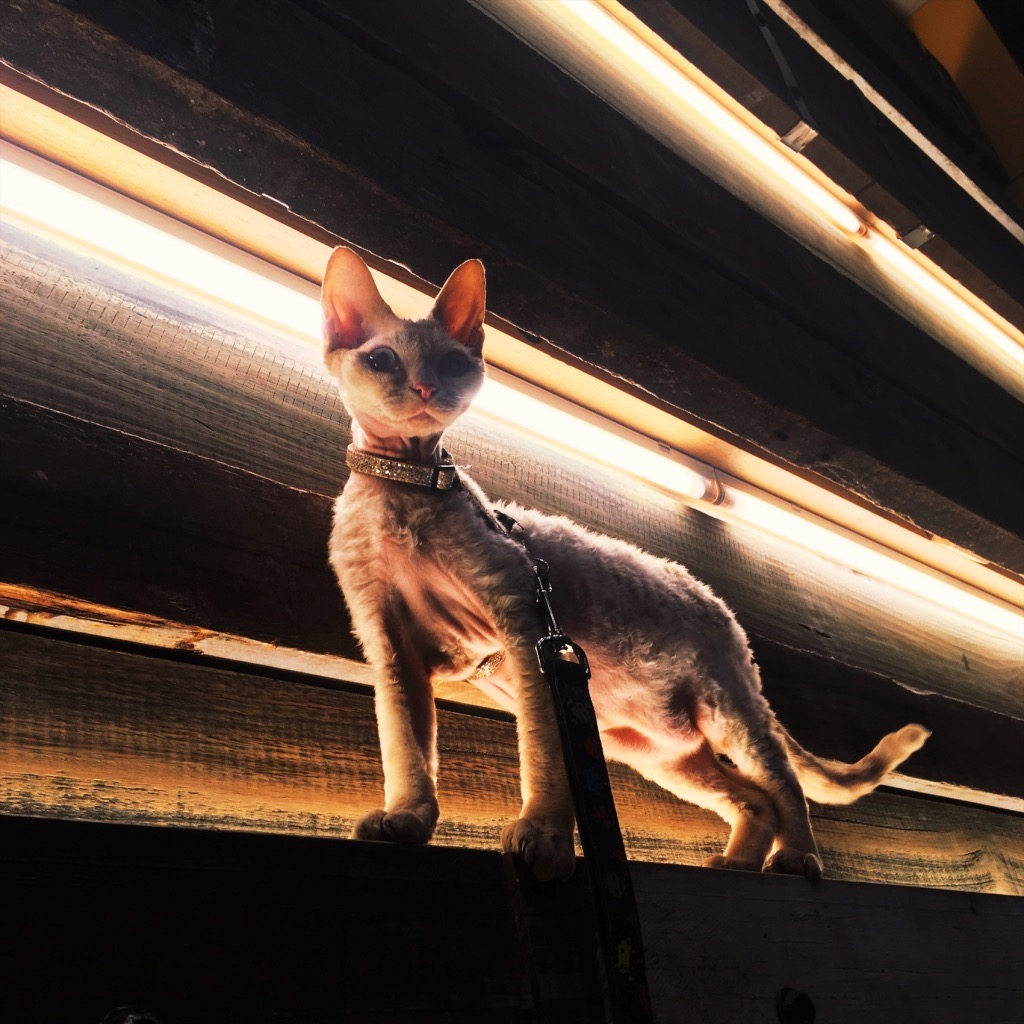
A devon rex kitten in Australia walking on a leash

== See also ==
- Cornish Rex
- German Rex
- LaPerm
- Selkirk Rex
- Sphynx cat
