= List of types of fur =

This list of types of fur describes the characteristics of types of fur used in fur clothing. Each type of fur serves its own purpose and has its own unique characteristics in garment manufacturing.

== Bear ==
There is evidence of bear hunting as early as the Neolithic. The ancient Romans seem to have imported bearskins from Germanic and Gallic tribes.

Product of the Northwest Fur Company in 1793

Bear skins (and the byproducts "bear grease" or "bear oil") were among those exchanged in the North American fur trade. Black, brown, and grizzly bears were all hunted for peltry in North America. Bear skins were among those harvested from the Aleutian Islands.

== Beaver ==
Beaver fur has long been used in making muffs, stoles, collars, trimmings, and felt for hats. The American beaver scores a 90/100 on the Austin Fur Durability Chart making it practical for utilitarian items such as linings. In the twenty-first century beaver is considered a premium fur and is often seen as very attractive to designers.

Sheared beaver is slightly less durable, with an Austin score of 85/100, but has a velvet-like texture and is very plush. The process of shearing involves shearing the pelt to make it shorter and then plucking all the guard hairs to reveal only the soft under-fur beneath, this underwool is what beaver felt is made out of. The under-fur of a beaver is vary dense, keeping the animal warm in freezing waters.

== Chinchilla ==
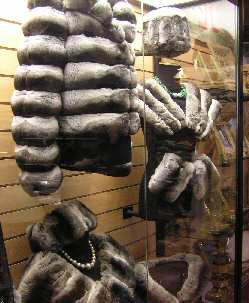
Chinchilla fur garments on display in Ushuaia

Characterized by their dense, velvety texture, chinchilla fur is one of the most expensive and luxurious of all fur types. Each follicle on a chinchilla's body produces 60 hairs, making the fur the densest of any land-dwelling mammal. The most common coloration for chinchillas is a medium grey body, black dorsal stripe, and white underbelly but other colors such as mosaic (white and grey), and all white are also common.

Indigenous to South America, chinchilla fur became first became popular in the 19th century in Western countries where the unregulated hunting of wild chinchillas quickly led to their becoming an endangered species in their native range. In 1923 chinchillas were brought to the United States of America to be bred for their fur as the hunting of wild chinchillas became illegal; these were the antecedents of all chinchillas used in the fur trade today.

== Coyote ==
The fur of coyotes is dense and durable, and produced in a wide range of colors and qualities, depending on the subspecies of coyote from which the fur was removed. Primarily seen as a pest animal in many locations, coyotes are not often utilized for their fur, but are nonetheless well-suited for producing practical garments. The long guard hairs, often confused with those of the raccoon dog, are normally dark and long, making them suitable for use as parka ruffs, similar to wolf fur.

== Faux ==
Faux fur or fake fur is a material made of synthetic fibers designed to resemble fur, normally as part of a piece of clothing.

== Fisher ==
Fisher fur varies from grayish brown to nearly black. The fur is about two and one-half inches (about 60 mm) in length. It is used mainly for muffs and neck, shoulder pieces. The trapping of fishers is restricted in many states leading to it becoming a more uncommon type of fur in comparison to the mink. Fisher fur is more durable and water resistant than other types of fur such as fox.

== Fox ==
=== Red fox ===
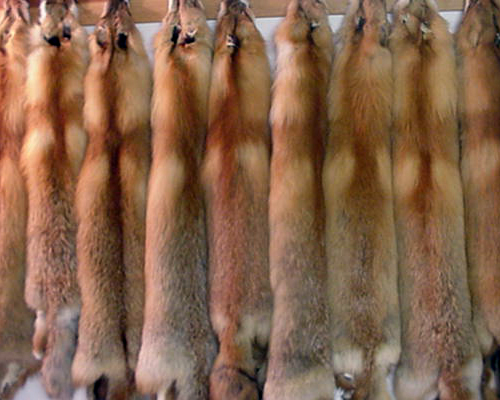
Wild red fox skins

Because of their abundance, red foxes are among the most important furbearing animals harvested by the fur trade. Their pelts are used for trimmings, scarves, muffs, jackets and coats. They are principally used as trimming for both cloth coats and fur garments, including evening wraps. The pelts of silver-morph foxes are popular as capes, while cross foxes are mostly used for scarves and very rarely trimming. The number of sold fox scarves exceeds the total number of scarves made from other furbearers. However, this amount is overshadowed by the total number of fox pelts used for trimming purposes. The silver morphs are the most valued by furriers, followed by the cross and red morphs respectively. In the early 20th century, over 1,000 American fox skins were imported to Britain annually, while 500,000 were exported annually from Germany and Russia. The total worldwide trade of wild red foxes in 1985–86 was 1,543,995 pelts. Foxes amounted to 45% of US wild-caught pelts worth $50 million.

North American red foxes, particularly those of northern Alaska, are the most valued for their fur, as they have guard hairs of a very silky texture that, after dressing, provide less restricted mobility to the wearer. Red foxes in southern Alaska's coastal areas and the Aleutian Islands are an exception, as they have extremely coarse pelts that rarely exceed a third of the price of their northern Alaskan cousins. Most European peltries have very coarse textured fur compared to North American varieties. The only exceptions are the Nordic and Far Eastern Russian peltries, but they are still inferior to North American peltries in terms of silkiness.

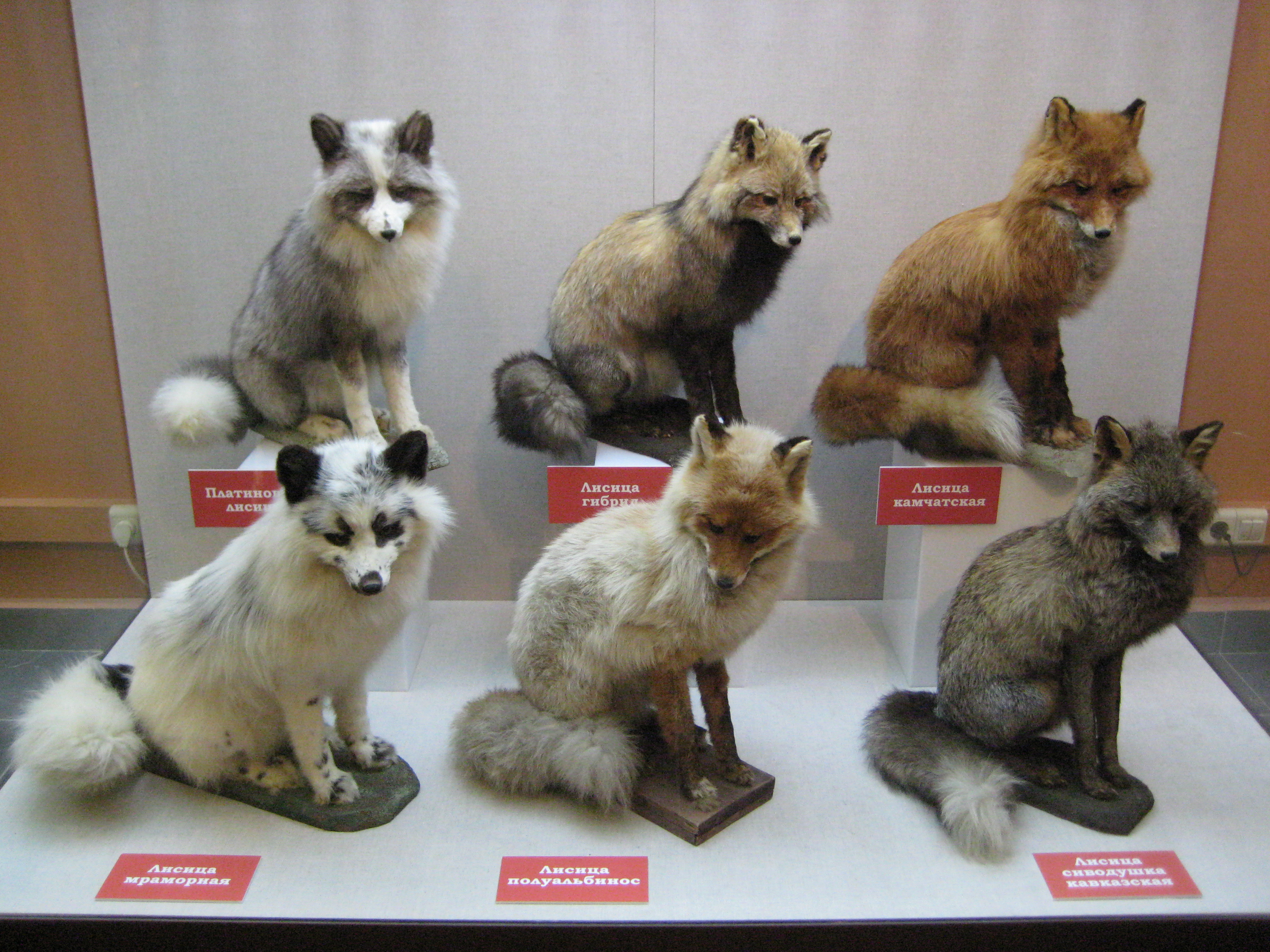
Colors of farmed foxes. Top (left to right) - platinum, cross, standard red. Bottom - marble, pale red, smoky.

The greatest source of fox pelts is from fur farms located in Scandinavia, Canada, the United States, Russia, and China. The two most commonly farmed species of fox are the American red fox (Vulpes vulpes fulva) and the arctic fox (Vulpes lagopus). The red fox was initially farmed in 1895 in Prince Edward Island in an attempt to boost the number of silver fox (melanistic fox) pelts which were the most coveted at the time. As well as silver and red foxes, farms were also able to breed other natural morphs such as cross (partially melanistic) and albino fox pelts. As time progressed farmers started to produce foxes of various colors such as marble (white with a different colored stripe down the back), platinum (light silver with white face and neck marking), and amber (a light brown). Farmed red foxes express a wide variety of colors, longer fur, thicker neck ruffs, and are significantly larger than wild foxes.

=== Gray fox ===
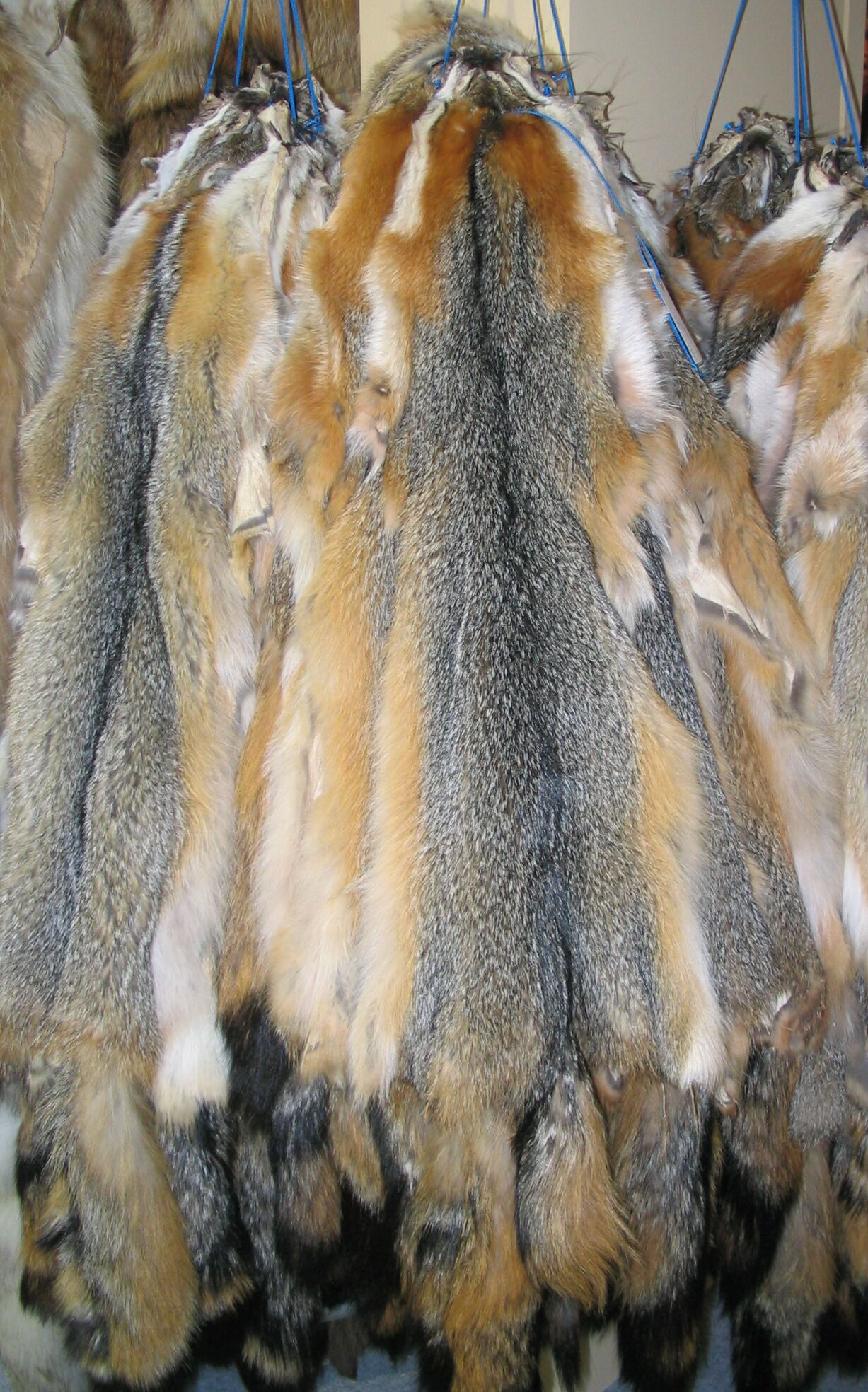
North American gray fox fur

Gray fox fur is obtained from the gray fox, a species distinguished from most other canids by its grizzled gray upper parts. It has reddish coloration on some parts of its body, including the legs, sides, feet, chest, and back, as well as on the sides of the head and neck. White fur is seen on the ears, throat, chest, belly, and hind legs, and it has a black stripe along the middle of its tail, which ends in a black tip. The species occurs from southern Canada to northern South America.

=== Arctic fox ===
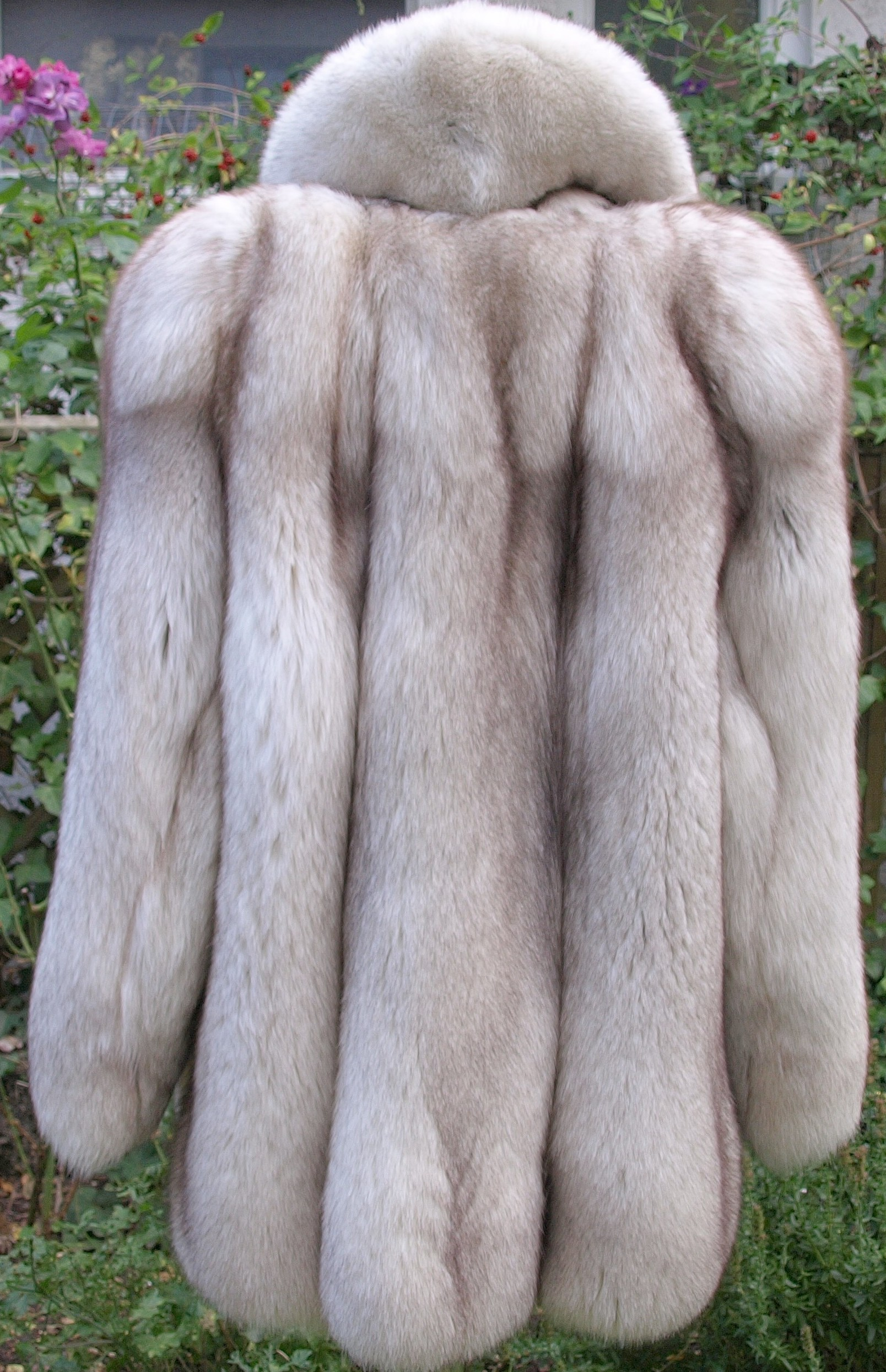
Blue fox jacket

The fur of the arctic fox (Vulpes lagopus) is the most popular of all the farmed fox species, particularly the blue fox (white with grey tips) and the shadow blue fox (all white). The popularity of this fox has to do with the size of the production of arctic fox pelts and the dyeable nature of the color lead it to being a accessible fur for designers and furriers to work with.

=== Blue fox ===
Blue fox fur is a type of fur obtained from the arctic fox (most specifically, its blue variant). The other of the two zoological morphs is called white fox, whose fur (the white fox fur) is also a fur commodity.

=== Hybrid fox ===
Hybrid foxes, made by artificially inseminating a female arctic fox with the zygotes of a male red fox, are larger than either of their parent species and are born infertile. It's unknown if these foxes suffer from any negative health side-effects as they're not kept longer than pelting season. Golden Island Foxes are the offspring of a female white arctic fox and a common male red fox, they are the most popular type of hybrid fox. Other popular types of hybrid fox, often called 'frost fox' are blue frost and arctic marble frosts.

== Golden jackal ==
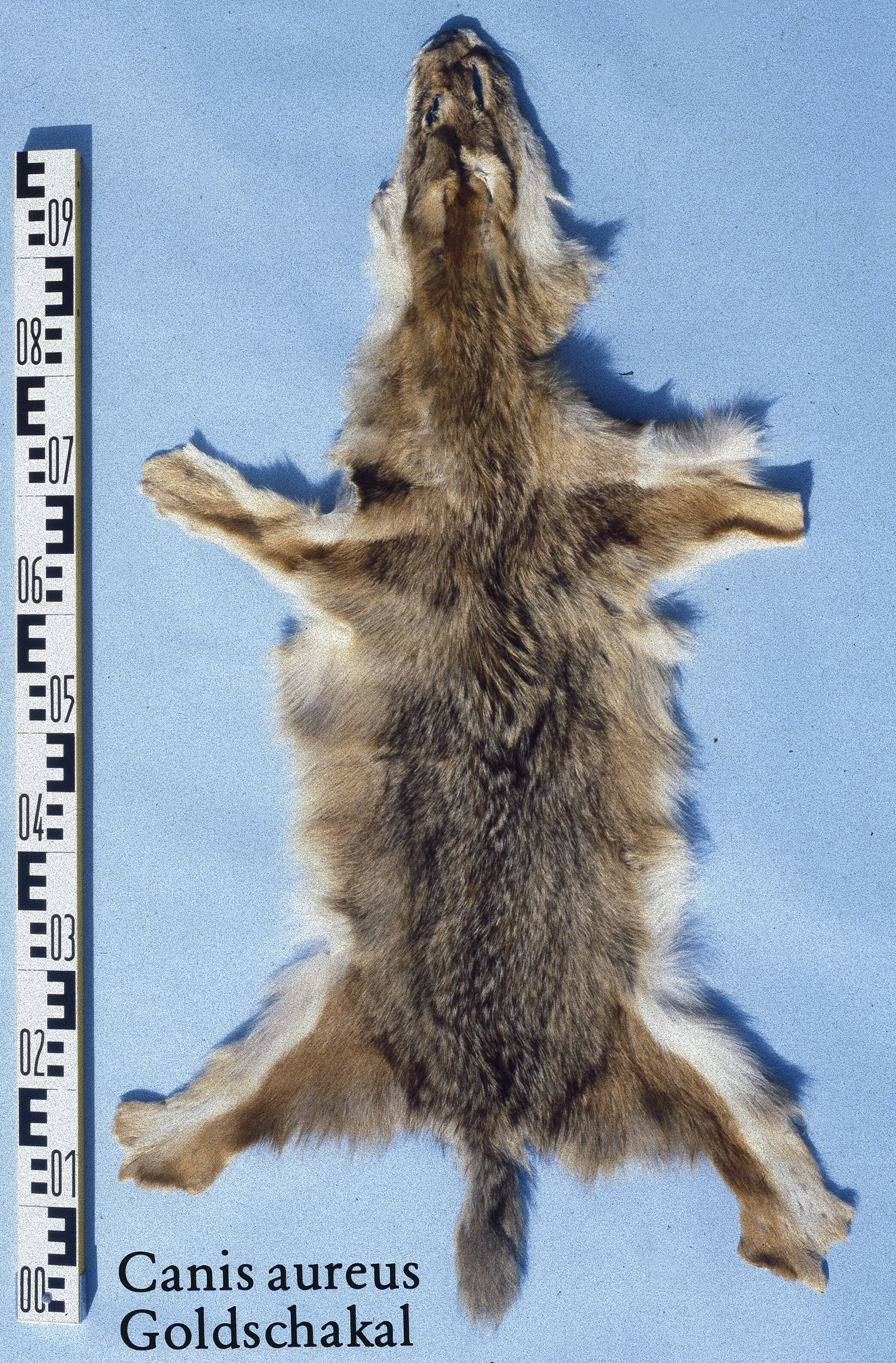
Golden jackal pelt

Although no longer popular globally, in Russia and other nations of the former Soviet Union, golden jackals are considered furbearers, albeit ones of low quality due to their sparse, coarse and monotonously colored fur. Asiatic and Near Eastern jackals produce the coarsest pelts, though this can be remedied during the dressing process. As jackal hairs have very little fur fiber, their skins have a flat appearance. The softest furs come from Elburz in northern Iran. Jackals are known to have been hunted for their fur in the 19th century: in the 1880s, 200 jackals were captured annually in Mervsk. In the Zakatal area of the Trans-Caucasus, 300 jackals were captured in 1896. During that period, a total of 10,000 jackals had been taken within Russia, and were sent exclusively to the Nizhegorod fair. In the early 1930s, 20–25 thousand jackal skins were tanned annually in the Soviet Union, though the stocks were significantly underused, as over triple that amount could have been produced. Before 1949 and the onset of the Cold War, the majority of jackal skins were exported to the US. Despite their geographical variations, jackal skins are not graded according to a fur standard, and are typically used in the manufacture of cheap collars, women's coats and fur coats. Jackal fur is still valued by the Kazakh people along the Caspian shoreline, as it is lighter and warmer than sheepskin.

== Lynx ==
The third most expensive fur, the lynx is a luxurious type of fur renowned for its silky, plush fur and the striking spots on its pelt. The three most common types of lynx in the fur trade are the Canadian lynx, the bobcat, and the Russian lynx. Due to CITES regulations, special permits are required to trap, sell, and own lynx furs.

The most expensive type of lynx fur is produced with only the white underbellies of the animals creating a pure white coat with dramatic black spots. The underbellies are very small, leading to the coats being difficult to make. The backs of most lynx have little to no spots, instead characterized by their cream and light grey coloration. Often mistaken for fox, lynx fur can be very long and silky, but is less durable then fox. The pelts of bobcats feature shorter fur but often have darker markings.

== Marten ==
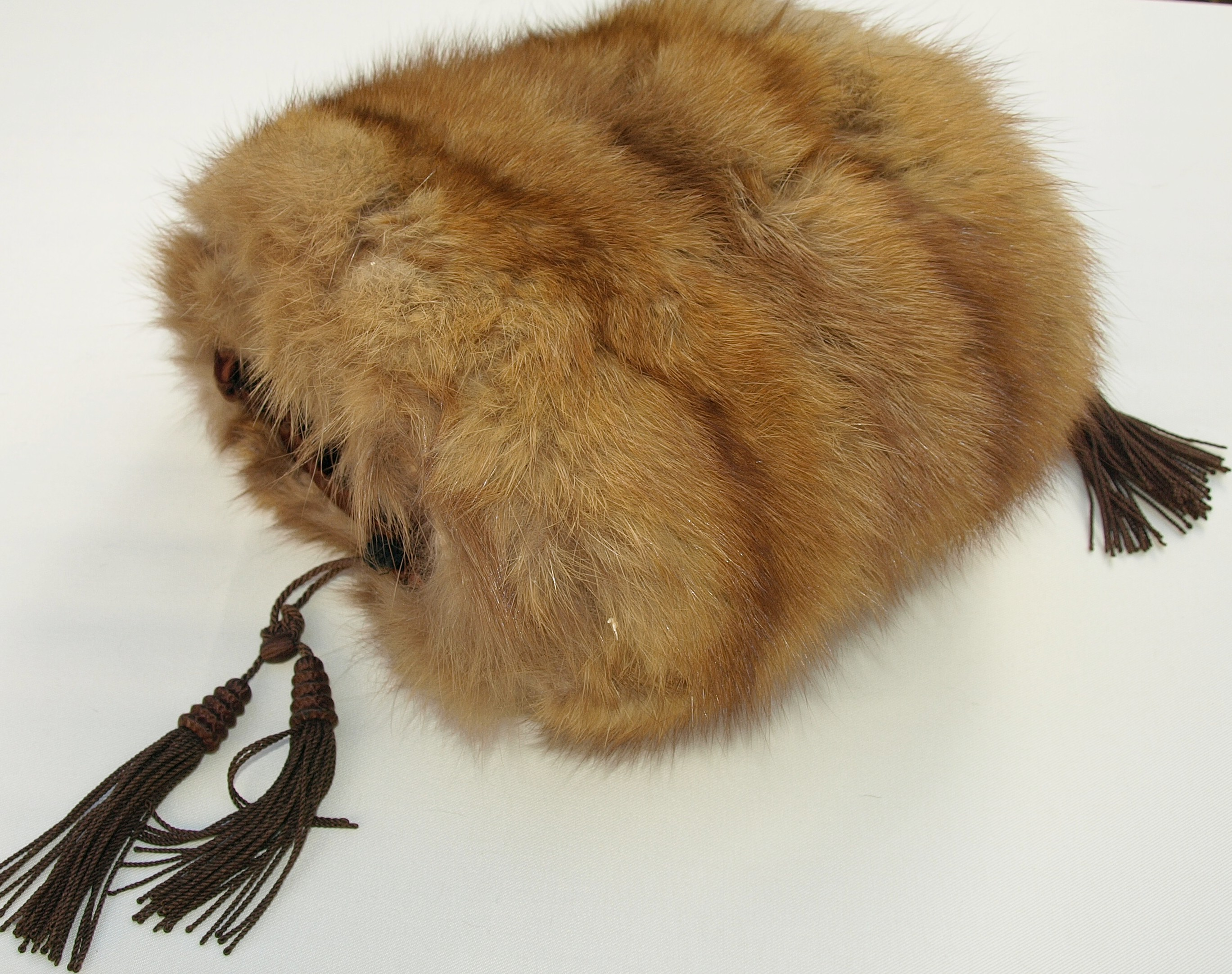
Historical Marten Fur Muff, England 1900-1910

Martens, the American equivalent of the sable, have a fur length of about one and one-half inches long. The color varies from pale grey to orange-brown and dark brown. The American pine marten sports a reddish brown coat and an orange-tinted throat, but their numbers in the wild were depleted until after the turn of the century. Their European cousin the stone marten is a paler beige color with a cream throat.

The stone martens that are the most valuable have a bluish cast to the fur with the underfur being lighter, and were popular in the 1950s with stone marten stoles, typically made of three to five pelts, being features in shows such as I Love Lucy.

Martens are desirable due to their mid-length fur and the durability of the hair follicles. The pelt of a marten possesses an oily texture similar to mink, but a longer silky hair like a fox.

== Mink ==
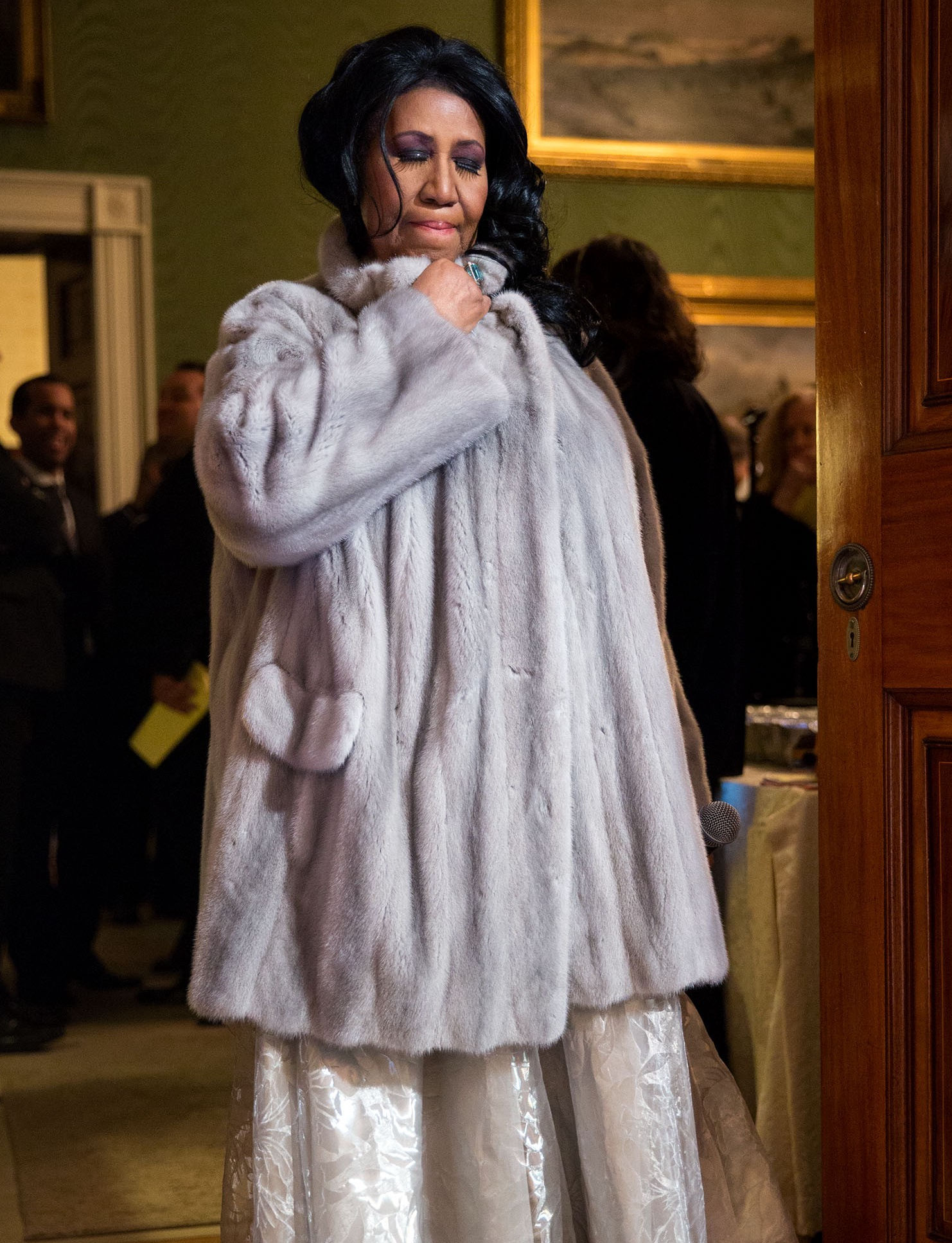
Aretha Franklin in a sapphire mink coat before a performance

Mink fur is the most popular fur traded worldwide. Its fur is durable, and the hairs are rather short, but very thick and soft. The guard hairs do not break readily, and the underfur does not tend to become matted. Sunlight gradually fades its original dark brown color a warmer tone, making it less attractive with time.

Up until the invention of the fur sewing machine, mink fur was unpopular. Wild mink are small mammals, males weighing 1 kg (2 lb 3 oz), making them difficult to work into a full garment. Once the fur sewing machine and fur farming became popular it was possible to breed farmed minks to be significantly larger and to use a method called "letting out" to make the mink pelt almost twice as long.

== Nutria ==
Nutria, or coypu fur is traditionally sheared, dyed and plucked. Its light weight makes it suitable for linings as well as coats, accessories and trims. Sometimes is now used without shearing or plucking, with the most valuable furs being in the richer browns. It is sometimes promoted as a 'guilt-free' fur, as it is considered a pest in the southern United States.

== Otter ==
Otter fur is about an inch long, erect, and thick. It is durable, ranking with mink fur, and is used chiefly for trimming garments. Otter fur is typically used in men's fashion as it has a dark brown, rugged look. River otters are currently the most common species currently used in the fur trade after the sea otter was declared endangered.

== Rabbit ==
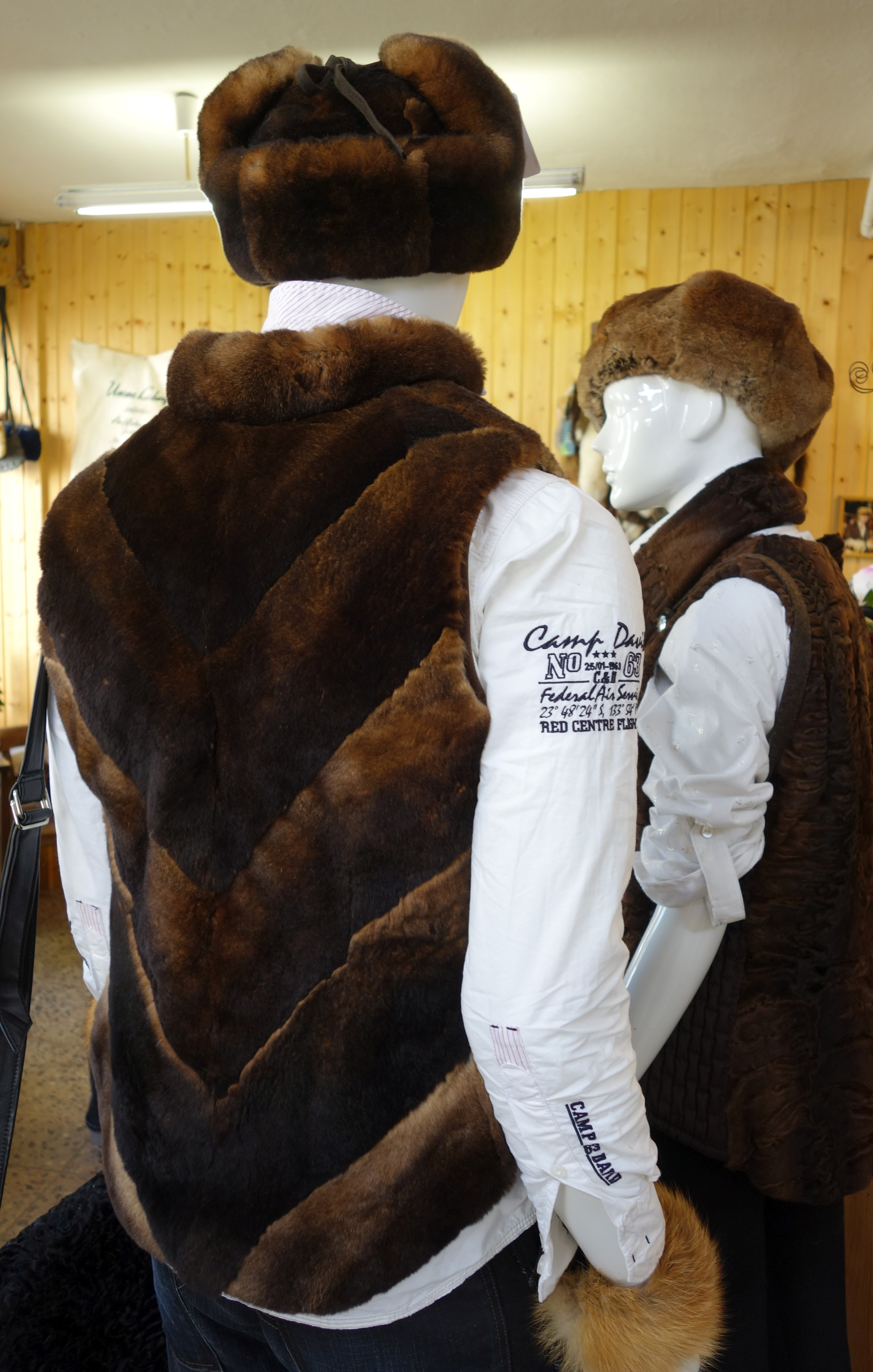
Men's vest and hat made from rex rabbit fur

Rabbit fur is commonly considered a byproduct of the process of breeding rabbits for meat, and as such is produced in large quantities in England and France; more than seventy million pelts a year in France alone. However, the quality of fur from these rabbits tends to be low, as the rabbits are slaughtered before reaching twelve weeks old and still have the infant coat.

In temperate climates, the highest-quality furs are obtained in winter from rabbits over five months old, when the thickness of the fur is even; at other times of year, varying degrees of hair shedding causes uneven patches in the fur. The coat is also at its thickest at this time of year. The highest quality pelts are suitable for clothing, and typically constitute less than half of all pelts collected.

The fur of rex rabbits are the most sought after rabbit pelts. Rex rabbits have a rare gene that causes them to have no guard hairs, only soft underfur. This makes all the fur on the pelt of equal length and incredibly soft to the touch. While the pelts of regular rabbits are often used in utilitarian garments for warmth, rex rabbits are made into higher grade garments and accessories.

Rabbit is the least durable of all furs, scoring 5/100 on the Austin chart of durability. Rabbit is also the cheapest of all fur. If a rabbit fur garment is shedding fur this means that it is dry rotted and can no longer be repaired.

The hair of the Angora rabbit is preferred to be combed and knitted due to its length, caused by an unusually long growth phase in the hair cycle, the consequence of a recessive gene. Angora rabbit pelts are typically hard to come by.

== Raccoon and finnraccoon ==
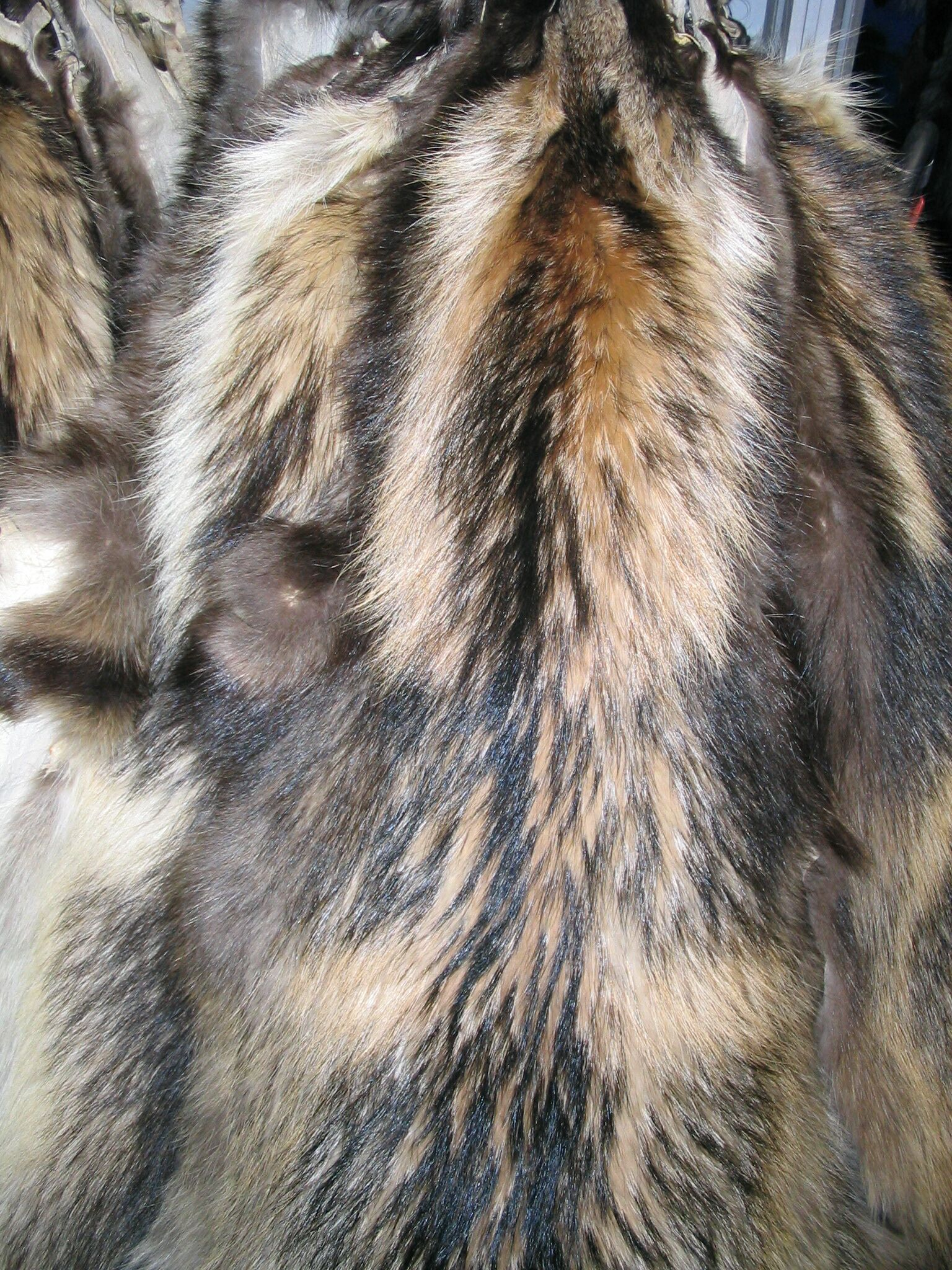
Finnraccoon (Asiaric raccoon dog) fur skins on display. Although often confused with the American raccoon, finnraccoons are a separate species.

=== American raccoon ===
Raccoon fur is mottled gray in color and about two and one-half inches long on animals from northern United States. In the southern United States the fur is shorter. Raccoon fur reached a heyday in the United States during the 1920s, when raccoon coats became fashionable among college students to stay warm while traveling in automobiles and attending football games.

=== Finnraccoon (Asiatic raccoon dog) ===
Finnraccoon (also called tanuki, finncoon, fincoon, Finnish raccoon, racoon dog, or just raccoon) is the fur of the Asiatic raccoon dog. While often called "raccoon fur", the raccoon dog, or tanuki, is actually a type of canine and is far more common in the fur trade as compared with North American raccoons. Finnraccoon fur is used for whole garments or hood trims.

Finnraccoon is characterized by its caramel-brown fur, grey underfur, and black tipped guard hairs often with the tip of the shaft featuring a speck of white. Although this orangish brown color is the most common, finnraccoon also naturally comes in dark brown, natural white, cream with light brown tips, and even a 'marble' variety. Brightly dyed Finnraccoon is increasingly popular to make parka trims. The furs of a finnraccoon are longer than that of red foxes, making them the longest furred animals of the farmed furbearers.

Due to the finnraccoons' omivourous diet and adaptable nature, they're illegal to import live into the United States so can only be farmed in Asia and Europe. Escaped finnraccoon are a highly invasive species in Europe and have been spotted in urban areas.

== Sable ==
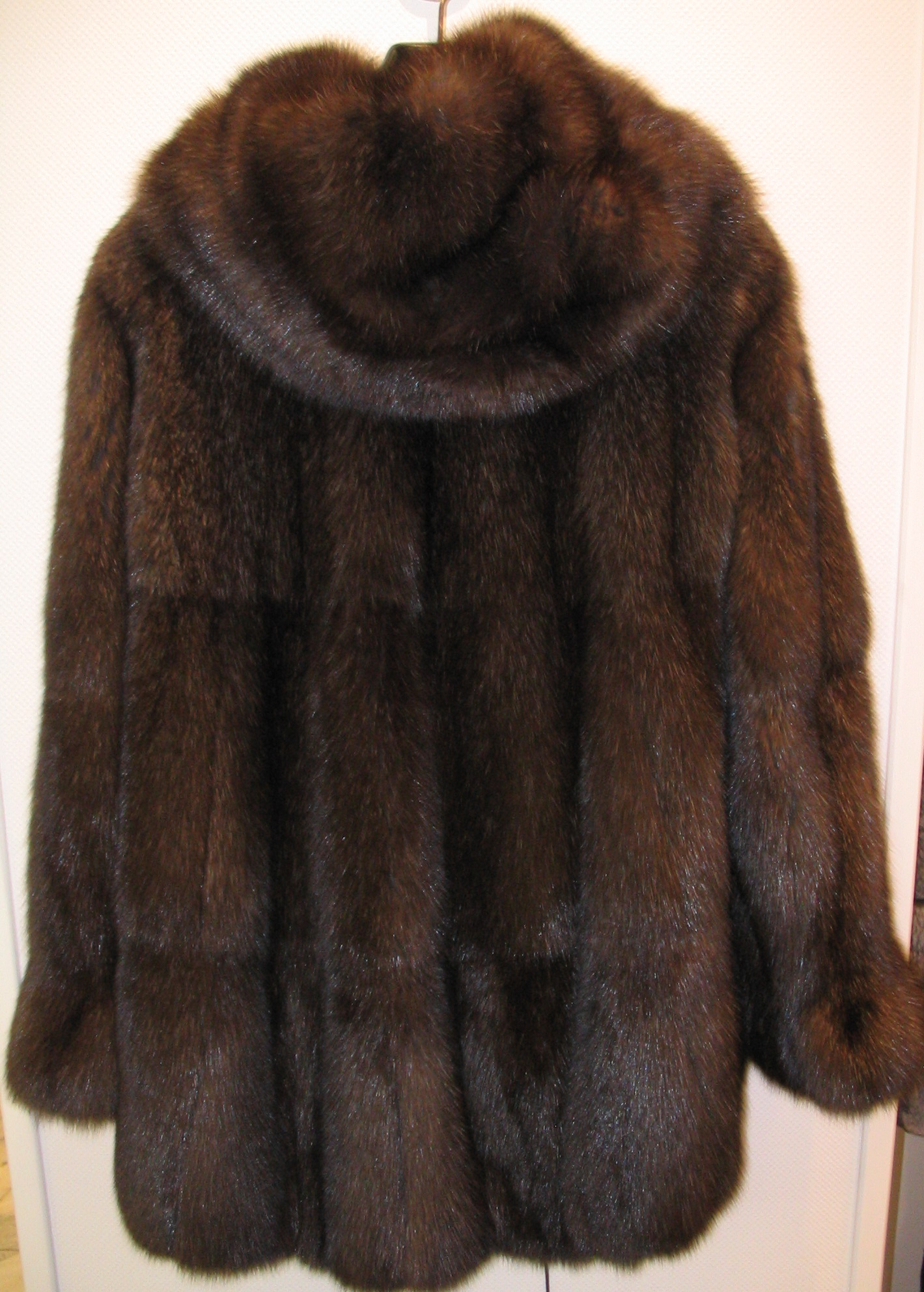
Bargusin sable-fur jacket

The sable, a species of marten, is primarily found in Russia through the Ural Mountains of Siberia. Their fur is soft and silkier than American martens and is mostly used for jackets, scarfs, and hats and gloves. Crown sable (also known as Russian or Imperial sable) was the finest and most expensive quality of sable.

Sables have been a status symbol throughout history, with the Russian nobility coveting their skins. Russia still controls the world's sable supply with auctions for their furs in the region still demanding high prices. Although sables are farmed for their furs, breeding them is incredibly difficult, meaning many are still hunted in the wild.

== Sheep (shearling) ==
The fur of sheep and lamb, often referred to as shearling or sheepskin, is a by-product of the meat and wool industry and is considered the most common type of fur and one of the most affordable. Not only is shearling incredibly durable, but is also affordable due to the production of sheep for other products.

The furs of some types of lamb such as Karakul lamb can be as expensive as exotic furs for their unique patterning and short hair. Persian lamb is also popular, as well as lamb with tight curls. Most lambs made into fur were slaughtered for their meat or due to illness, not to make fur garments. This makes lamb a more ethical choice for people who are opposed to the killing of animals strictly for their fur.

== Skunk ==
Skunk fur is of medium length, erect, and possesses a sheen. However, protracted use causes it to fade from a glistening black to a dull reddish brown. Before the mid-20th century, skunk fur was also described and marketed as "Alaska sable". Skunk fur farming was documented in the United States and the United Kingdom as skunks are docile and resilient against predators but suffered from a lack of demand due to the unpopular associations between skunk and their spray.

== Grey wolf ==
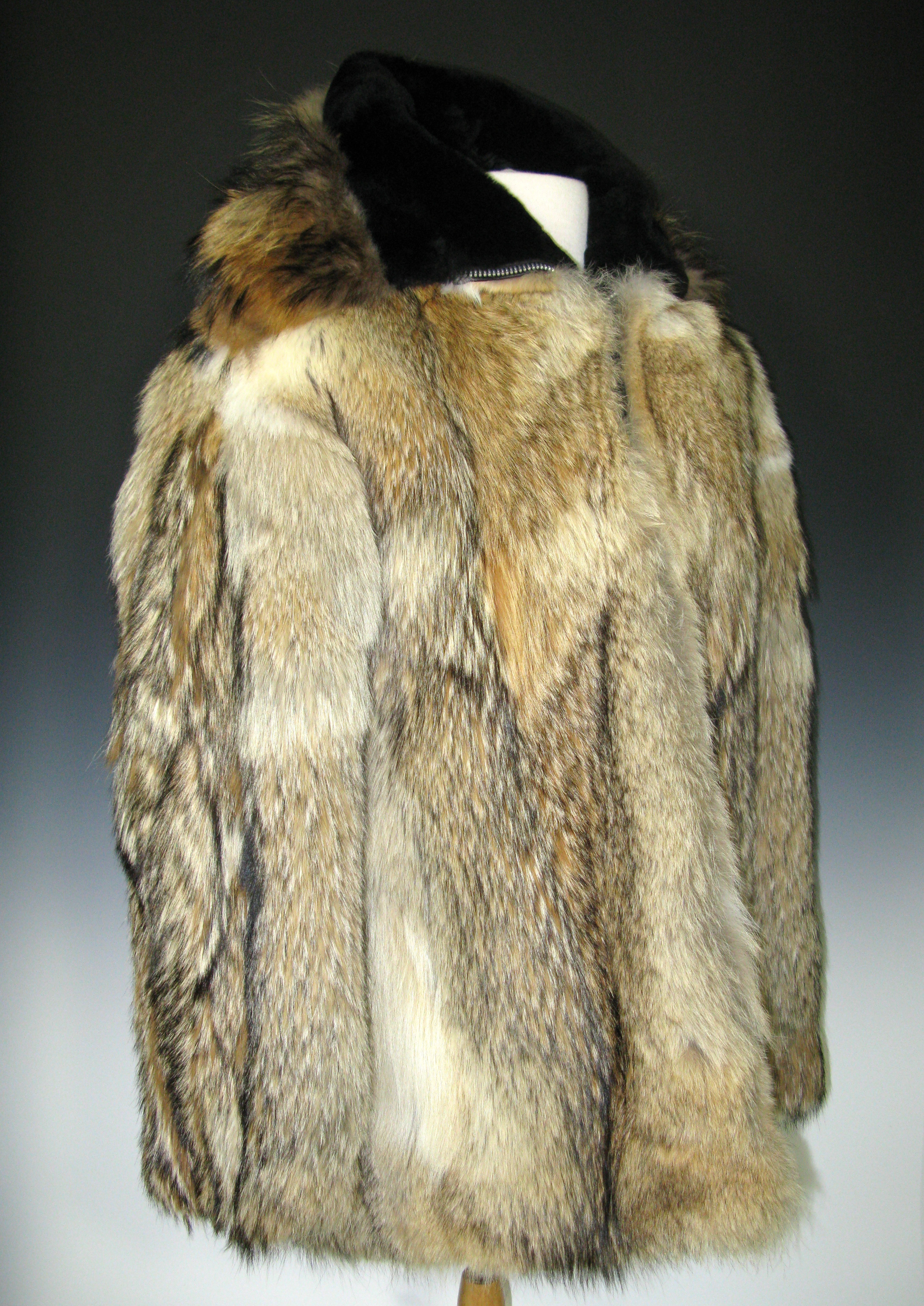
Wolf fur coat

Wolf pelts are primarily used for scarfs and the trimmings of women's garments, though they are occasionally used for jackets, short capes, coats, mukluks and rugs. The quality of wolf peltries rests on the density and strength of the fur fiber, which keeps the fur upright and gives the pelt an appealing bushy aspect. These characteristics are mostly found in northern wolf populations, but gradually lessen further south in warmer climates. North American wolf pelts are among the most valuable, as they are silkier and fluffier than Eurasian peltries. The pelts of wolves killed by poison are mostly worthless.

In Medieval Europe, pelts were considered the only practical aspect of wolves, though they were seldom used, due to the skin's foul odour. In Scandinavian folklore, wolf-skin girdles assisted in transforming the wearers into werewolves. Several Native American tribes used wolf pelts for medicinal purposes, though some Inuit tribes favour dog skin over wolf skin, as the latter is thinner, and more prone to tearing when sewn. The Pawnee wore wolf skins as capes when exploring enemy territories. The United States Army used wolf skin for parkas during the later stages of WWII and the Korean War to protect the faces of soldiers from frostbite. In the Soviet Union, between 1976 and 1988, 30,000 wolf pelts were produced annually. Recent statistics from CITES indicate that 6,000–7,000 wolf skins are internationally traded each year, with Canada, the former Soviet Union, Mongolia and China being the largest exporters, and the United States and Great Britain being the largest importers. Overall, the harvesting of wolves for their fur has little impact on their population, as only the northern varieties (whose numbers are stable) are of commercial value. Wolf trapping for fur remains a lucrative source of income for many Native Americans.

== Australian brushtail possum ==
The skin of the common brushtail possum were used as cloaks by Aboriginal people in south-eastern Australia prior to European colonization.

The Australian brushtail possum (paihamu in Maori) was introduced to New Zealand in 1837, where unlike Australia, there are no natural predators. This has resulted in an enormous wild population, approximately 70 million, that has a catastrophic effect on natural vegetation. Not to be confused with the North American opossum, a different animal, the paihamu eat their way through an estimated 20,000 tonnes of greenery each night. They are legally considered a pest. Since the mid-1990s, New Zealand manufacturers have been developing techniques to spin the hollow possum fur fibres with other yarns, such as merino wool and silk, creating a unique fabric of incomparable quality, warmth and durability. Amongst the top three warmest furs in the world, along with the Polar bear and Arctic fox, possum fur has become a viable eco-fur.
