= Selkirk Rex =

Breed of cat

- Origin: United States

Breed standards
- CFA: standard
- FIFe: standard
- TICA: standard
- ACF: standard
- ACFA/CAA: standard
- CCA-AFC: standard
- GCCF: standard

The Selkirk Rex is a cat breed with curly hair that was developed in the United States in the late 1980s. The Selkirk Rex is distinct from the other Rex breeds by the thick quality of its coat, while LaPerm, Devon Rex and Cornish Rex have sparser curly coats. The Selkirk Rex are known for their placid, social and cuddly nature.

== History ==
The Selkirk Rex originated in Montana, USA in 1987, with a litter born to a rescued cat. The only unusually coated kitten in the litter was ultimately placed with breeder Jeri Newman, who named her Miss DiPesto, after a curly-haired character in the TV series Moonlighting played by Allyce Beasley. This foundation cat was bred to a black Persian tomcat, producing three Selkirk Rex and three straight-haired kittens. This demonstrated that the gene had an autosomal dominant mode of inheritance. All Selkirk Rex trace their ancestry back to the cat Miss DiPesto. Jeri Newman named the breed after her stepfather, "Selkirk," making this the first (and currently only) breed of cat to be named after an actual person.

American Shorthairs, Persians, Himalayans, Exotic Shorthairs, and British Shorthairs have been used as outcrosses to develop this breed. The breed was accepted by The International Cat Association in 1992, the American Cat Fanciers Association in 1998, and the Cat Fanciers' Association in 2000. In 2020 Cat Fanciers' Association (CFA) discontinued using Persian cats as an outcross, and in 2025 - British Shorthair or Exotic. Starting from 2025 Selkirk Rex kittens registered with CFA must have only Selkirk Rex parents. As of 2024, TICA permits Selkirk Rex to be outcrossed with British Shorthair, British Longhair, American Shorthair, Persian, Himalayan and Exotic cat breeds.

== Appearance ==
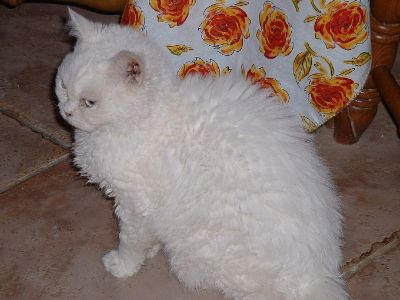
A white Selkirk Rex

Selkirk Rex is a medium to large cat with a solid, muscular body and heavy boning. Adult males weigh between 12 and 15 pounds, females are somewhat smaller. The head of a Selkirk is round and full-cheeked. Their eyes are round and set well apart, as are the medium-sized ears.

Selkirk Rex comes in shorthair and longhair varieties with unstructured, loose, random curls. Curliness tends to manifest more around the neck, the tail and the belly. On shorthair Selkirks, the hair is the same length all over the body, while longhairs have longer ruff and tail hair. Their whiskers are curly, fragile, and tend to break off. Unlike other Rex breeds with reduced amounts of hair, the Selkirk Rex is not recommended for those who might be allergic to cat allergens.

The breed is accepted in all colors, including pointed, bicolor, cinnamon, silver/smoke and chocolate.

== Health ==
There are no known health problems specific to the Selkirk Rex breed. Like other Rex breeds, irritation of the inside of the ear by curly fur can occur, increasing the production of ear wax. Homozygous cats (with two copies of the dominant Selkirk Rex gene) may have a tendency towards excessive greasiness, requiring more bathing. Other health problems may be inherited from the outcross breeds used, including polycystic kidney disease from Persians and hypertrophic cardiomyopathy from British Shorthairs.

In the UK, all Selkirk Rex cats registered with the Governing Council of the Cat Fancy (GCCF) for breeding are genetically tested for Polycystic Kidney Disease or are from two genetically tested parents.

== Genetics ==
The Selkirk Rex is defined by an autosomal incomplete dominant woolly rexoid hair (ADWH) abnormality that is characterized by tightly curled hair shafts. Heterozygous cats exhibit a full, randomly curled coat, whereas homozygous cats have a tight, soft and wavy curl, similar to the Cornish Rex. In addition to the curl pattern, homozygous cats also display a more slender body composition with bigger ears and a less rounded appearance of the head. The inbreeding coefficient of the Selkirk Rex population is low, on par with domestic cats of no specific breed.

A splice variant in the gene KRT71 was found to be associated with the curly coat phenotype. KRT71 is a crucial gene for keratinization of the hair follicle. An allele of this gene is also responsible for the hairless (hr) Sphynx and the Devon Rex (re) hair. Three mutations in KRT71 have now been identified in cats, forming the allelic series, KRT71SADRE > KRT71+ > KRT71re > KRT71hr, where SADRE is the suggested locus designation for the Selkirk autosomal dominant rex 21 allele.
