= Rex rabbit =

Family of rabbit breeds

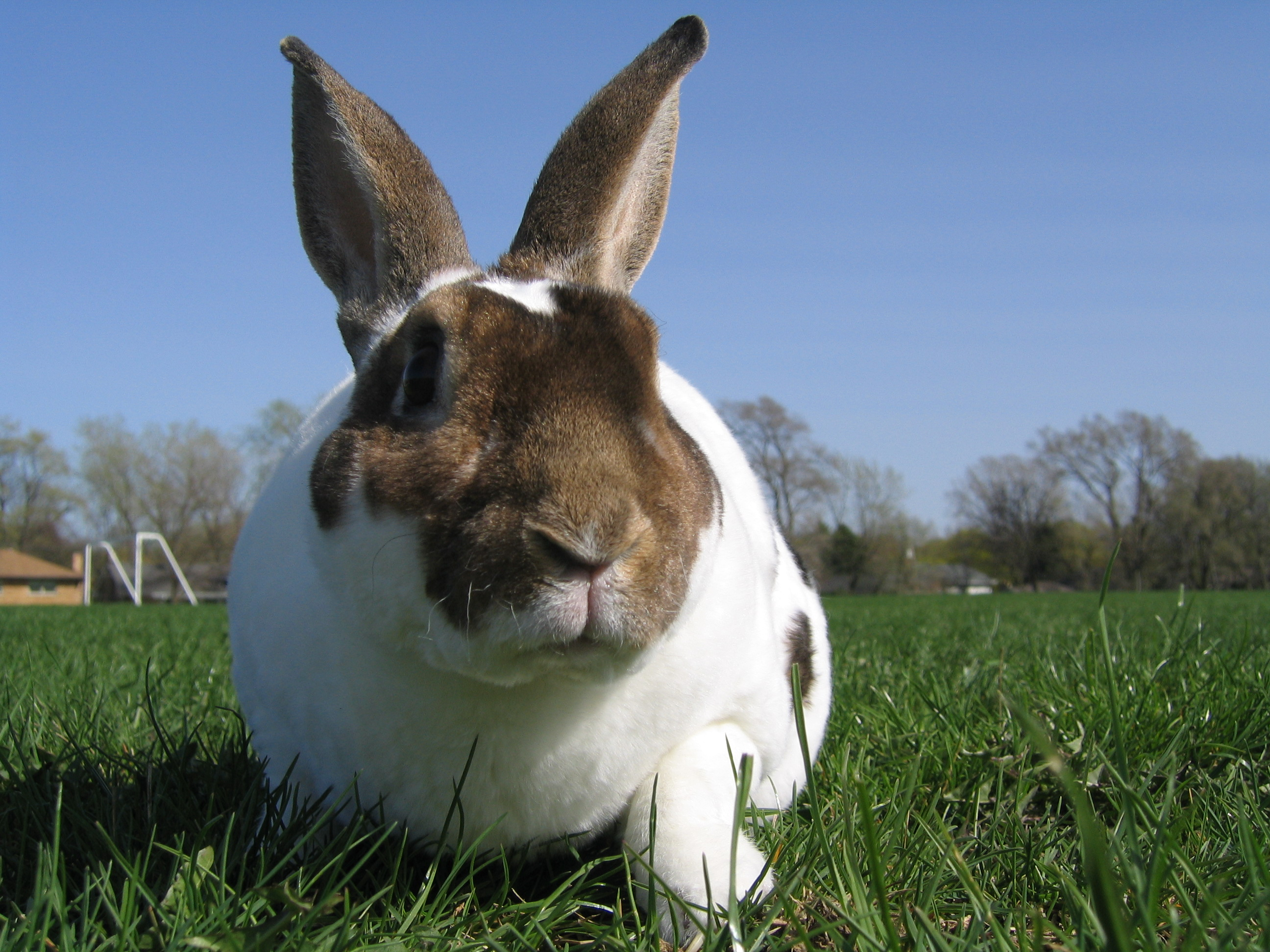
This broken castor rex rabbit is uneasy about being in an open field.

The term rex rabbit (without capitalization) refers informally to one of at least eight breeds of domestic rabbit. One such breed is the Rex, which is recognized by the American Rabbit Breeders Association (ARBA) and by the British Rabbit Council (BRC). Other modern-day rex rabbit breeds are listed below. Care must be taken to distinguish the rex rabbit breeds from the three types of rex rabbit fur for which they are known.

The Rex rabbit breed that is recognized by ARBA is a medium-sized rabbit with a commercial, round body and an ideal weight range of 3.4–4.8 kg (7.5–10.5 lb). The Rex has a slightly broader head than other breeds of rabbit, proportionate upright ears, and proportionally smaller feet. As with most larger breeds, the female (or doe) has a dewlap (a large flap of skin under the chin).

== History and origin ==
The Rex is a variety of rabbit that exhibits plush fur that is often described as having a velvety texture. The breed originated in France in 1919. Its origin was a litter of wild gray rabbits and has been developed over the years by fanciers and the fur industry. The Rex Rabbit was first shown publicly at the Paris International Rabbit Show in 1924 and has been recognized as a standard breed in parts of Europe since 1925. Eugène Kohler at the University of Strasbourg developed the breed further, giving rise to colored varieties and the chinchilla rex, which is one of the main breeds used in the rabbit fur farming industry.

The Rex was first imported to the United States in 1924 following the Paris International Rabbit Show by American rabbit pioneer John C. Fehr and his partner Alfred Zimmerman.

== Genetics ==
Many genes contribute to the Standard Rex breed. The definition of the breed is maintained by ARBA and the British Rabbit Council (BRC). The definition is based strictly on phenotype. The gross external features used to identify the rabbit include weight, coloration, coat texture and length. Of these features, amongst fanciers and the fur industry, the coat properties are of chief concern. This breed has a low to moderate activity level and can jump as high as three feet.

== Fur ==
The word rex (with a lowercase 'r') refers to the unique characteristics of an animal's "rexed" fur. It is the result of a specific genetic mutation that is now deliberately sought in the Rex rabbit breeds. In rex fur, the hair protrudes outwards from the body, instead of lying flat, and the guard hairs are shortened to the length of the undercoat, or a bit longer. Because of the density of hairs, rex fur is often described as plush or velvety. Three varieties of rex fur now exist: standard rex fur, short curly rex fur (as in the Astrex), and long curly rex fur (as in the Opossum).

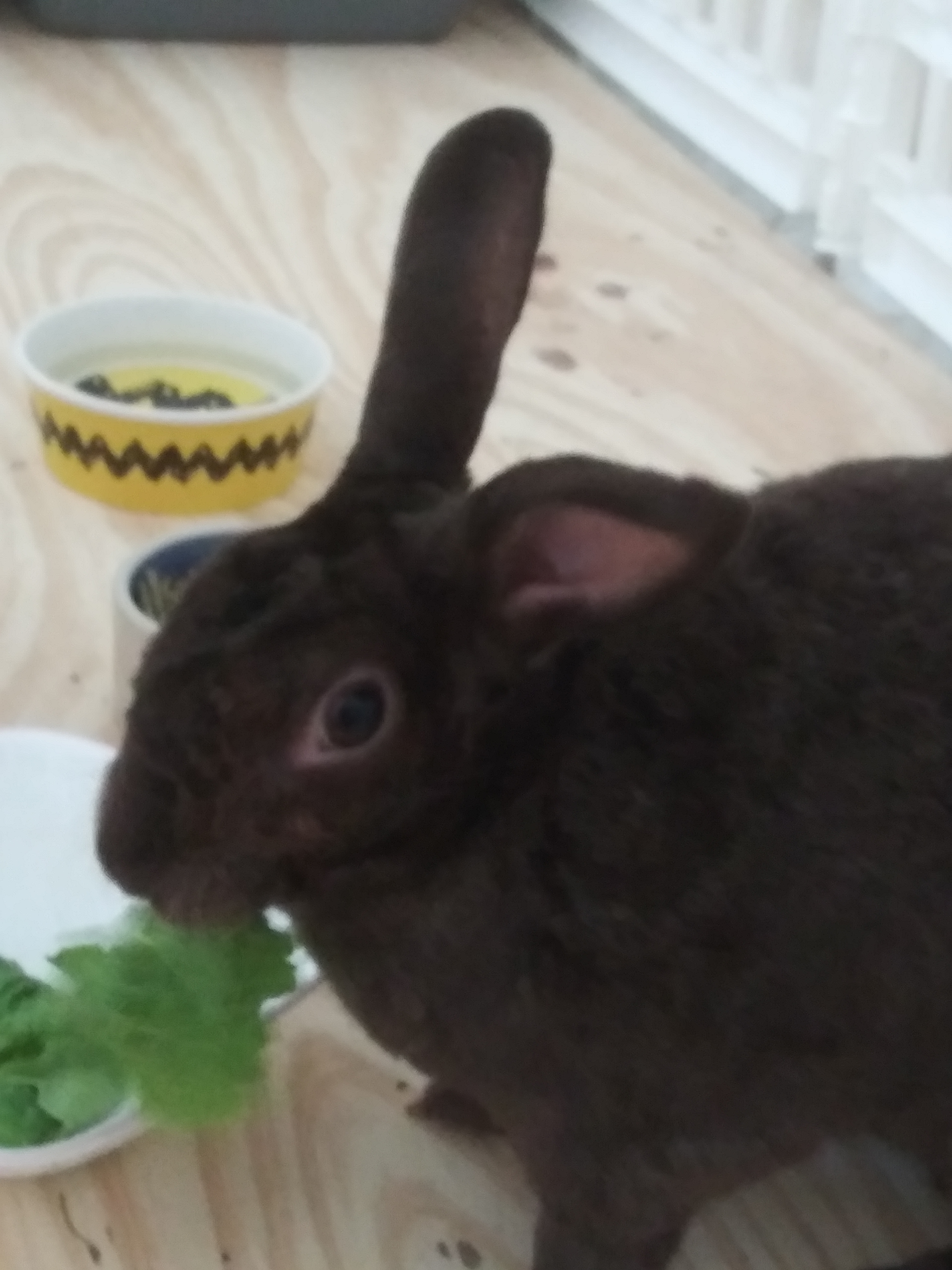
A dark colored pet rex rabbit eating

== Varieties ==
ARBA currently recognizes 16 color varieties for the Rex rabbit breed, while the BRC currently recognizes 32.

There are clubs for fanciers of particular rabbits and the Standard Rex is no exception.

== Modern development ==
Currently, Rex Rabbits are kept as pets, as show rabbits, and for fur and meat production. The Rex remains the number one breed used in fur production for garments and toys as their fur lacks protruding guard hairs which in other breeds which must be shorn and plucked after the tanning process to resemble other animal furs. The bulk of furs produced in the United States are more of a by-product to the primary purpose of meat production and are of lesser quality. Meat production favors harvest of young animals (70–84 days) which is not sufficient time for the rabbit to grow a high quality adult fur. The fur is best after 6 months and during the coldest part of the year. The overwhelming number of furs produced in the USA are used in the creation of felt because the fur quality of commercially raised rabbits is of too low a quality for the garment trade. See: Production of Rabbit Skins and Hair for Textiles

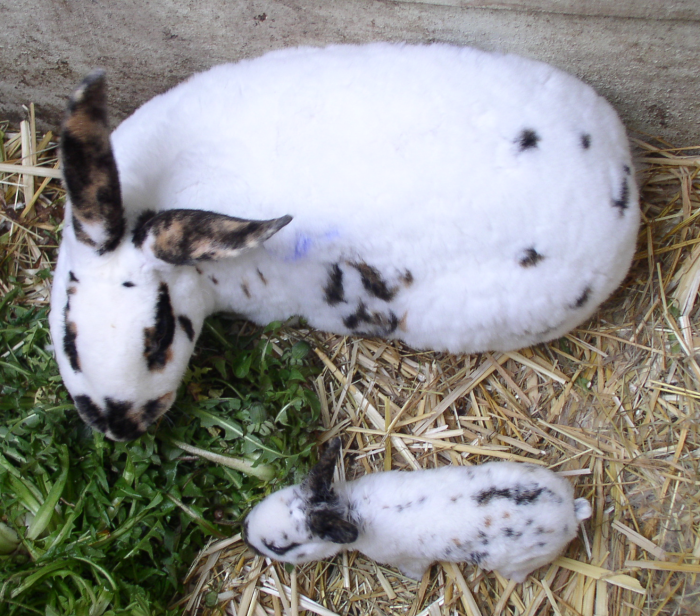
A Tri-Colour Rex doe with kit

== Rex rabbit breeds ==
- Astrex
- Canadian Plush Lop
- Mini Rex
- Opossum
- Rex [US]
- Velveteen Lop

== See also ==
- Fur farming
- House rabbit
- List of rabbit breeds
- Rabbit fur
