= German Rex =

Breed of cat

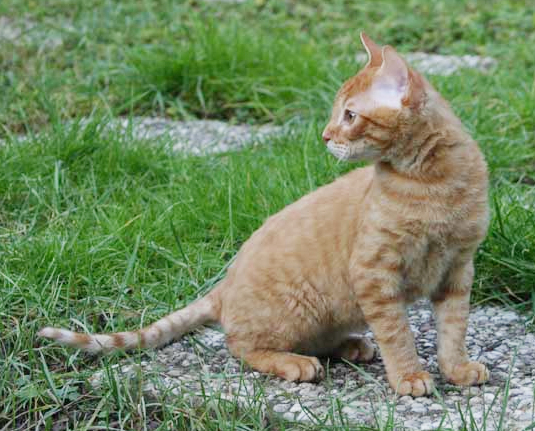
- Common nicknames: Rex
- Origin: Germany

Breed standards
- FIFe: standard

The German Rex is a breed of domestic cat.

== Description ==
The German Rex is a medium-sized breed with slender legs of a medium length. The head is round with well-developed cheeks and large, open ears. The eyes are of medium size in colours related to the coat colour. The coat is silky and short with a tendency to curl. The whiskers also curl, though less strongly than in the Cornish Rex. They may be nearly straight. All colours of coat, including white, are allowed. The body development is heavier than in the Cornish Rex - more like the European Shorthairs.

== Temperament ==
A German Rex cat is very friendly and quickly bonds with its human. It is lively, playful, and intelligent. Its temperament is much the same as a Cornish Rex.

== History ==
An early Rex-type cat from Germany was Kater Munk, a cat of the family of one Erna Schneider, that was born 1930 or 1931 in a village near then-Königsberg, German Reich (today's Kaliningrad, Russia). Munk was the son of a mahogany Angora cat and a Russian Blue. There were one (some sources say two) other curly cat(s) in the litter which was castrated early. Munk spread his genes plentifully among the village's cat population till his death in 1944 or 1945. The Schneiders valued the strong tom with a penchant for catching fish from the family's garden pond for himself, not for his curly coat; he was, it seems, referred to colloquially as a Preußig Rex ("Prussian Rex", in local dialect). German Rex researchers do not consider Kater Munk to be related to the German Rex breed and state that he was never bred.

In the summer of 1951, a doctor in Berlin-Buch (Pankow borough), Rose Scheuer-Karpin, noticed a black curly-coated cat in the Hufelandklinik hospital garden. The clinic's personnel told her that they had known the cat since 1947. The doctor named the cat Lämmchen (German for "little lamb"). Her supposition that she must be the result of a mutation, was shown to be correct. Thus Lämmchen was the first breeder-owned Rex-type cat and the maternal ancestor of all current German Rex cats.

The first two German Rex deliberately bred were two Rex kittens from a 1957 litter of four, offspring of Lämmchen and the straight-coated son Fridolin she had with a stray black tom Blackie adopted by Scheuer-Karpin. Lämmchen died on December 19, 1964, or in 1967, indicating she had been very young when first sighted in 1947. She left a number of Rex and crossbred descendants - the last one of her offspring was born in 1962 - most of which were used to improve other breeds such as the Cornish Rex which was suffering from skin problems due to being descended from genetically impoverished thoroughbred stock. In 1968, the lineage hinged on the efforts of the GDR cattery vom Grund who acquired the last 3 Rex offspring of Lämmchen not sold abroad, and amplified the lineage with European Shorthair and mixed-breeds. A stock was established in the West through the efforts of the FRG von Zeitz cattery in 1973 which in the previous year had acquired their sample of the allele with the white female crossbred Silke vom Grund. After some years, the breed slowly became more plentiful.

Another Rex cat turned up in Berlin-Buch, apparently in the late 1950s. The tom named Schnurzel eventually contributed to German Rex breeding; it is not known how he related to Lämmchen but presumably he was a grandson of hers, as Scheuer-Karpin would let her cats roam free through the gardens and forests of Buch. Even in more recent times, the genetic legacy of Lämmchen if not Munk manifests itself on occasion in the Berlin area, such as Pumina, found as a stray inage of Preuss from Siegburg which turned up in 1979 in the Rhineland town of Siegburg does not appear to be related to be a German Rex proper; it is almost certainly not related to Lämmchen. Nonetheless, his descendants may have contributed to the German Rex lineage of today.

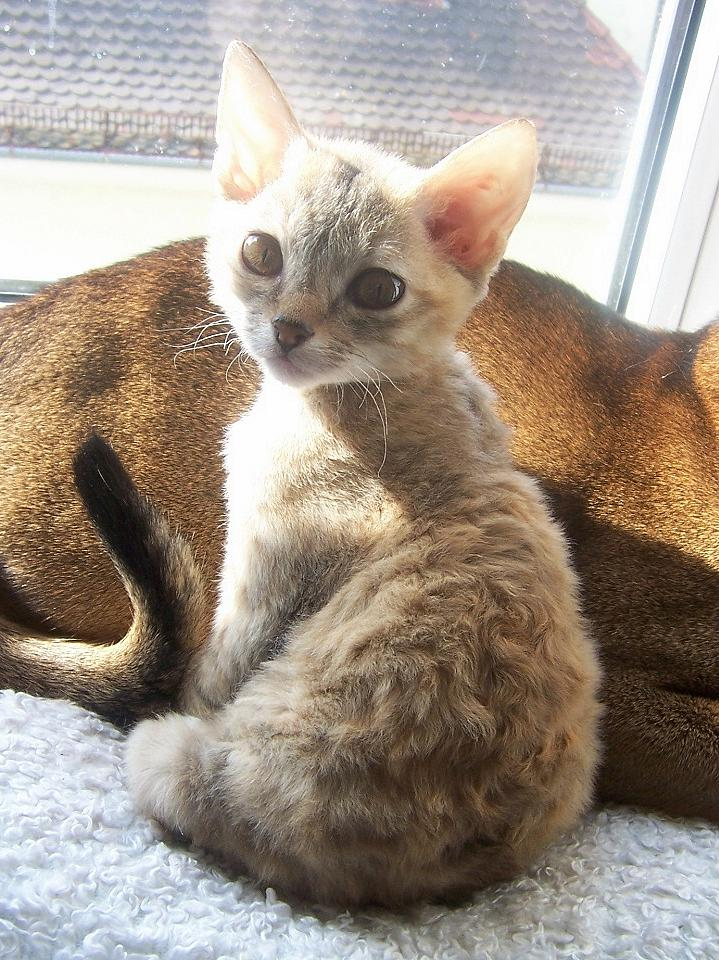
German Rex kitten Alana. Looking at the curly coat, it is easy to see why Scheuer-Karpin would call her cat Lämmchen (little lamb).

== Genetics ==
It is not certainly known how Lämmchen relates to Munk, only that the German Rex mutation - on the same gene as in the Cornish Rex - is recessive, meaning it will only show when both alleles are "Rex", and that Munk is the first thoroughly documented Rex cat, though as stories of "children cuddling curly coated kittens" attest, Rex alleles turn up every now and then. Presumably, Munk sired many offspring with local cats, none of which would have had curly fur as the allele of Munk's straight-haired mates would dominate. In the following years, any curly-haired cats in the Königsberg area went unnoticed or at least were not bred on purpose; the allele nonetheless would have stood good chances to remain in the local cat population, as recessive alleles have a very low probability to disappear entirely.
