= Cornish Rex =

Breed of cat

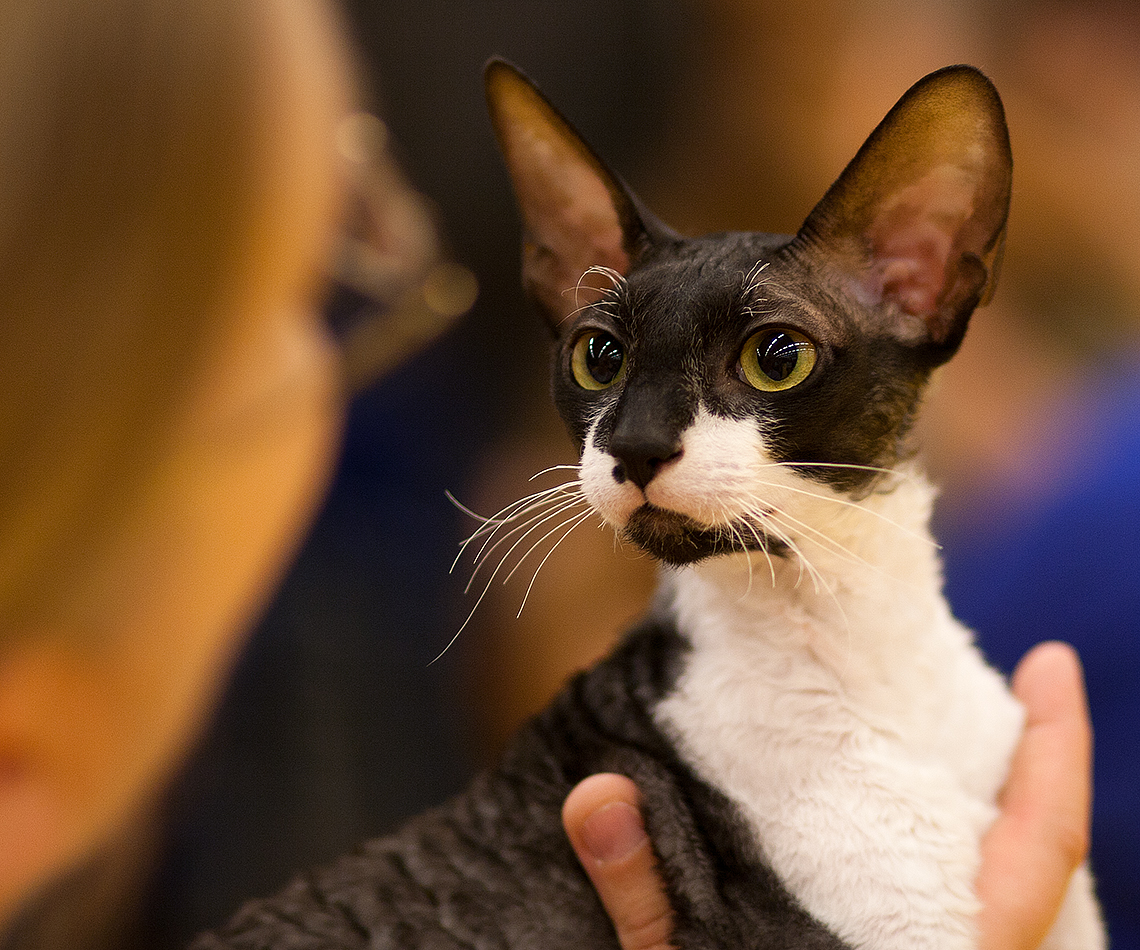
- Distinctive Cornish face, high cheekbone and large ears.
- Other names: Rex, Corny/Cornies
- Origin: United Kingdom

Breed standards
- CFA: standard
- FIFe: standard
- TICA: standard
- ACF: standard
- ACFA/CAA: standard
- CCA-AFC: standard
- GCCF: standard

The Cornish Rex is a breed of domestic cat. The Cornish Rex only has down hair. Most breeds of cat have three different types of hair in their coats: the outer fur or "guard hairs", a middle layer called the "awn hair"; and the down hair or undercoat, which is very fine and about 1 cm long. Cornish Rexes only have the undercoat. The curl in their fur is caused by a different mutation and gene than that of the Devon Rex. The breed originated in Cornwall, Great Britain.

== Characteristics ==
The coat of a Cornish Rex is extremely fine and naturally curly. Their light coat means that they are best suited for indoor living in warm and dry conditions, as they are sensitive to low temperatures.

The breed is sometimes referred to as the Greyhound of the cats, because of the sleek appearance and the galloping run characteristic of the breed.

=== Appearance ===
According to the Governing Council of the Cat Fancy (GCCF) standard, the Cornish Rex's colour is irrelevant — therefore the cat may be any colour.

Aside from the distinctive coat, the Cornish Rex is set apart by its 'foreign type', slender legs and tail, oval eyes, and wedge shaped head. The Cornish Rex's ears are large and wide at the base with rounded tips and are described as being almost mussel shell shaped. The eyes are medium in size and come in all varieties of eye colour. The body is slender and muscular with small paws.

== Genetics ==
In 2013, researchers identified the mutation that defines the Cornish Rex breed. Genome-wide analyses were performed in the Cornish Rex breed and in 11 phenotypically diverse breeds and two random bred populations. A gene on chromosome A1, the lysophosphatidic acid receptor 6 (LPAR6), was identified to have a 4 base pair deletion. This induces a premature stop codon in the receptor that is absent in all straight haired cats analyzed. LPAR6 encodes a receptor essential for maintaining the structural integrity of the hair shaft. In humans, LPAR6 mutations result in a form of ectodermal dysplasia characterised by a woolly hair phenotype.

== Origin ==
The distinctive look of the Cornish Rex is a genetic mutation that originated from a litter of kittens born in the 1950s on a farm in Cornwall, UK. One of the kittens, a cream-colored male named Kallibunker, had an extremely unusual, fine and curly coat; he was the first Cornish Rex. The owner then backcrossed Kallibunker to his mother to produce 2 other curly-coated kittens. The male, Poldhu, sired a female called Lamorna Cove who was later brought to America and crossed with a Siamese, giving the breed their long whippy tails and big ears.

The Devon Rex looks similar in appearance to the Cornish Rex but has guard hairs and sheds. The Devon Rex mutation is different from the Cornish Rex mutation in that the Devon has shortened guard hairs, while the Cornish Rex lacks guard hairs altogether.

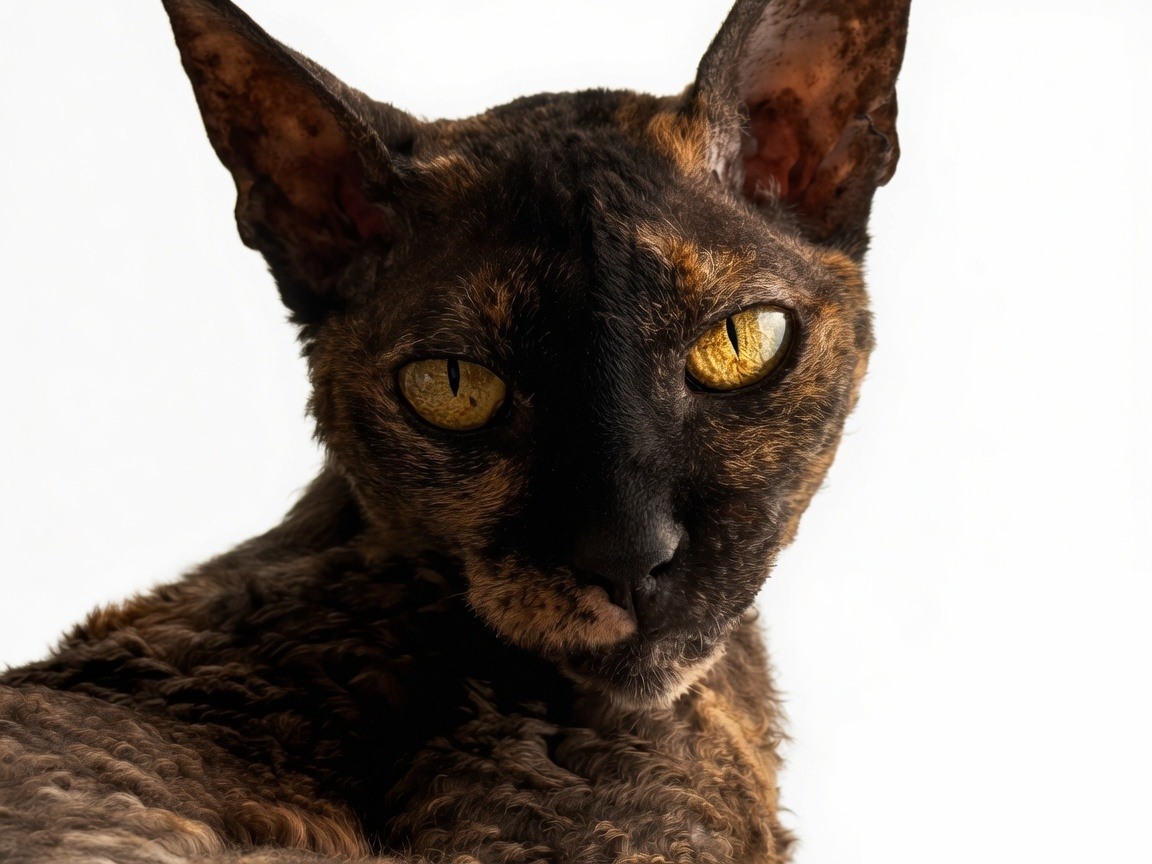
A 16-year-old female Smoky Tortoiseshell Cornish Rex cat named Lotta.

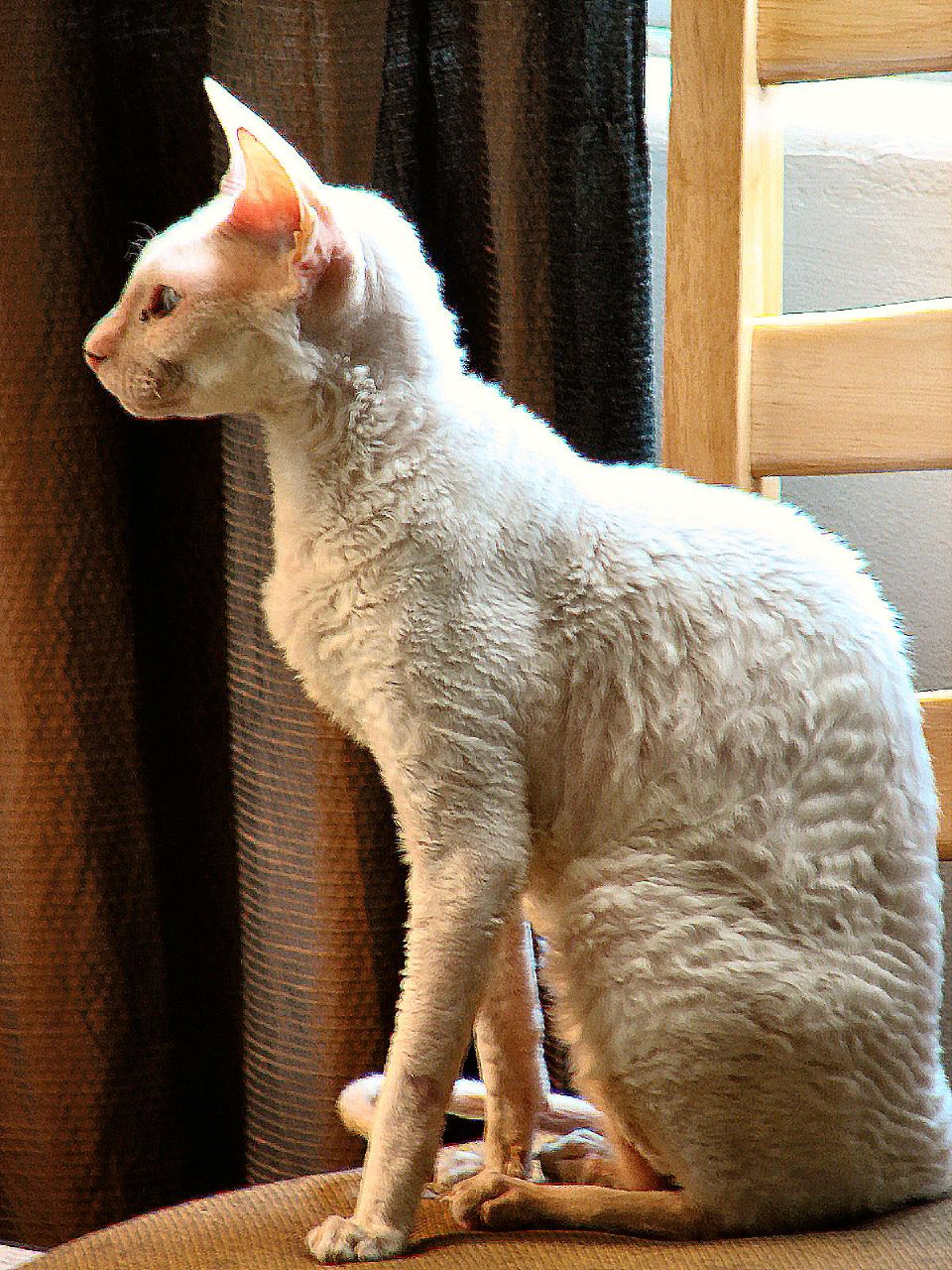
Profile view of a white Cornish Rex

== Hypoallergenic ==
Despite some belief to the contrary, the Cornish Rex's short hair does not make it non- or hypo-allergenic. Allergic reactions from cats are not the result of hair length, but from a glycoprotein known as Fel d 1, produced in the sebaceous glands of the skin, saliva, and urine. Most people who have cat allergies are reacting to this protein in cat saliva and cat dander: when the cat cleans its fur, the saliva dries and is transformed into dust that people breathe in. Since Cornish Rex cats groom as much as or even more than ordinary cats, a Cornish Rex cat can still produce a reaction in people who are allergic to cats. It is, however, widely reported to cause lesser to little allergic reaction.
