= Bobtail =

Bobtail may refer to:

- An animal with its tail bobbed
- A natural bobtail, an animal with a genetically short tail
  - Donggyeongi, a Korean breed of dog
  - Japanese Bobtail, a breed of cat
  - American Bobtail, a breed of cat
  - Kurilian Bobtail, a breed of cat
  - A nickname for the Old English Sheepdog
- A bobtail lizard or skink, species Tiliqua rugosa.
- A bobtail squid
- A tractor unit not pulling a trailer.
