= Natural bobtail =

Animal's tail which grows unusually short

A natural bobtail is an animal's tail which due to a mutated gene grows unusually short or is missing completely. The genes for the shortened tail may be dominant or recessive.

Because of legislation restricting or preventing docking, natural bobtails are growing in popularity among the dog fancy for some traditionally docked breeds. For example, one Boxer breeder and geneticist in England has successfully petitioned his Kennel Club for permission to cross Corgis into his lines and then backcross to Boxers, introducing the gene into his lines. This would have been unheard of in decades past. A number of these bobtail Boxers have been exported to various countries around the world.

However in some breeds, such as the Rottweiler, natural bobtails are not universally accepted in the Country of Origin Breed Standard.

== Animals with a natural bobtail ==
=== Cats ===
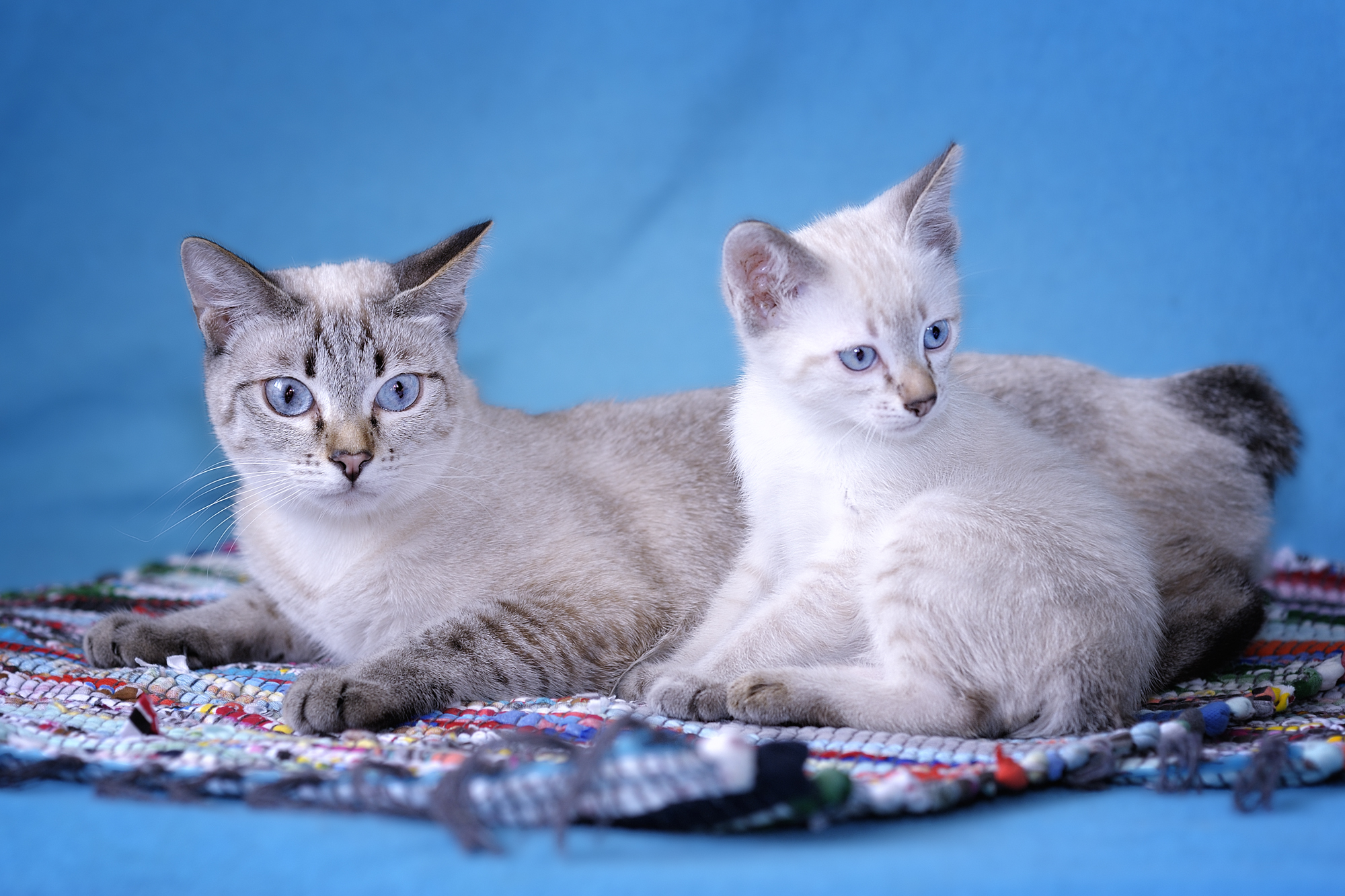
The Mekong Bobtail—a colorpoint cat breed with a bobbed tail

More than one gene is responsible for tail suppression in cats; research is incomplete, but it is known that the Japanese Bobtail and related breeds have a different mutation from that found in the Manx and its derivatives.

- American Bobtail
- Japanese Bobtail–tails are short and kinked, but not entirely absent
- Karelian Bobtail–tails are short and kinked, but not entirely absent
- Korean Bobtail–tails are short and kinked, but not entirely absent
- Kurilian Bobtail
- Manx, and Cymric or Manx Longhair; tails range from full to entirely absent
- Mekong Bobtail, a variant of the Siamese
- Pixie-bob

Experimental breeds (mostly cross-breeds of the above):

- Alpine Lynx cat
- American Lynx cat
- Desert Lynx cat
- Highlander cat
- Owyhee Bob

=== Dogs ===
A mutation in a gene called the T-box transcription factor T gene (C189G) accounts for natural bobtails in 21 dog breeds, but not in another 5 breeds, for which the genetic mechanism is yet to be determined. This study counted Rottweilers as not having the C189G gene, but tested only five Rottweilers, only two of which were short-tailed dogs. The mutation is autosomal dominant and appears to be lethal in the embryonic stage when homozygous. Another study showed that Rottweilers do carry the gene, and Dobermanns (not tested by the earlier study) do as well, the linked page provides a list of breeds associated as having the C189G Gene and been known for having Natural Bobtails in the breed. In addition the Pembroke Welsh Corgi identified in previous research.

Although the following dogs may present a natural bobtail, the C189G mutation often appeared after decades or centuries of docking, which in many countries is considered unnecessary, painful, cruel or mutilation. Today, many countries ban cropping and docking. In countries where docking is banned, natural bobtail dogs must present a certificate to show that their tail is a result of the C189G mutation in order to be shown.

Breeds that can present C189G mutation:

- Australian Shepherd
- Austrian Pinscher
- Australian Stumpy Tail Cattle Dog
- Braque du Bourbonnais (Bourbonnais Pointer)
- Braque Francais (Savoy Sheepdog)
- Brazilian Terrier
- Brittany
- Croatian Sheepdog
- Danish–Swedish Farmdog
- Dobermann
- Donggyeongi
- English Shepherd
- Jack Russell Terrier
- Karelian Bear Dog
- Labrador Retriever
- Mountain Cur
- Mudi
- Pembroke Welsh Corgi
- Polish Lowland Sheepdog
- Pyrenean Shepherd
- Rottweiler
- Schipperke
- Spanish Water Dog
- Swedish Vallhund

Breeds without C189G mutation and presenting natural bobtail:189

- Boston Terrier
- English Bulldog
- King Charles Spaniel
- Miniature Schnauzer
- Parson Russel Terrier

Dog breeds into which the C189G mutation has been introduced by cross-breeding:

- Boxer

Dog breeds where natural bobtails have not yet been tested for C189G mutation. Breeds in this sub-list often have full tails except for Hmong bobtail dog and French Bulldog:

- Armant
- Entlebucher Mountain Dog
- French Bulldog
- Hmong bobtail dog
- McNab
- Miniature Fox Terrier
- Old English Sheepdog
- Rat Terrier
- Tenterfield Terrier
