= Pixie-bob =

Breed of cat

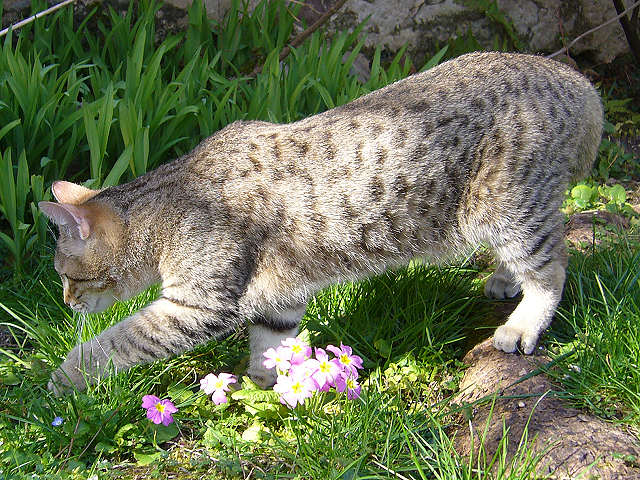
- Side view of the short-haired black spotted tabby coat
- Origin: United States
- Foundation bloodstock: U.S. landrace

Breed standards
- TICA: standard
- ACFA/CAA: standard
- CCA-AFC: standard

Pixie-bob is a pedigreed breed of domestic cat. The breed was originally claimed to contain bobcat admixture. However, it is generally regarded as pure domestic stock based upon historical DNA testing reportedly conducted in 1996, although the underlying methodology and primary data do not appear to be publicly available.

They were selectively bred in the United States from a number of domestic cats which were believed to contain admixture with the North American bobcat (Lynx rufus). They are relatively large-sized polydactyl cats with a short tail, and have a black spotted tabby coat.

== History ==
In the spring of 1985, Carol Ann Brewer purchased near Mount Baker, U.S., a unique male cat with a spotted tabby coat, a short tail, and polydactyl paws. In January 1986, she rescued another male cat named Keba, which was very large, had a bobbed tail, and was reported to have been sired by a bobcat. While this cat was starving, it still weighed 7.7 kg (17 lb), and was so tall it reached up to Brewer's knees. Shortly after she had acquired this large male, it mated with a next door neighbour's black spotted tabby female cat. In April 1986, a litter was born from this mating. Brewer eventually kept one of the female kittens, named Pixie, and after a year started a breeding program with Pixie as the foundation cat.

Over the next several years, Brewer introduced into her program 23 cats from around the nearby Cascade Range, that were believed by her to be the progeny of naturally occurring hybrid matings between bobcats and domestic cats (Lynx rufus × Felis catus). Reportedly, DNA testing has failed to detect bobcat marker genes,, although the primary data for this conclusion does not appear to be publicly available. Pixie-bobs are considered wholly domestic for the purposes of ownership, cat fancy registration, and import and export.

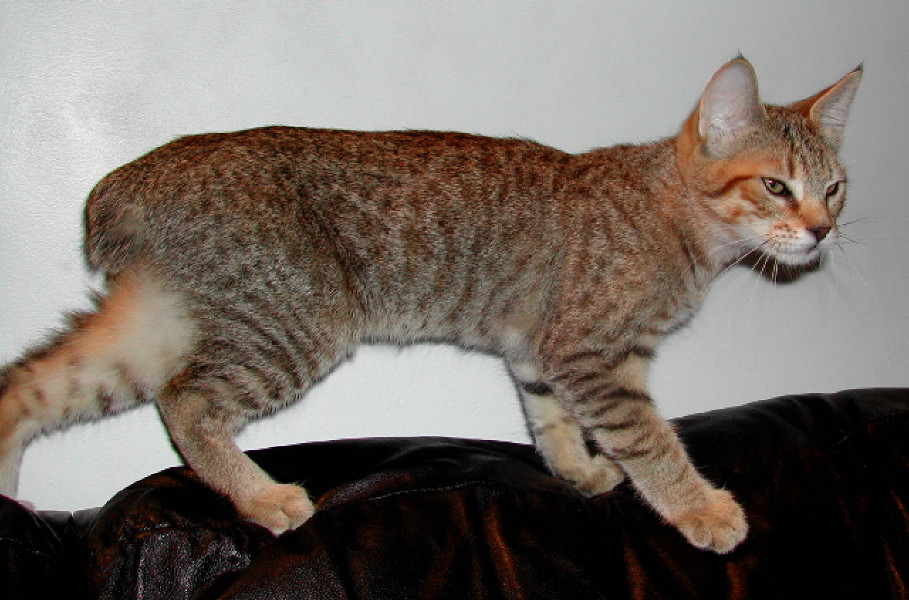
Female adult side view

She coined the term "Legend Cat" to refer to such hybrid cats and has since registered a trademark in the U.S. to limit the term to describe permitted outcrosses used in her breeding program. At the same time, other breeders in the U.S. were working with distinctly wild looking barn cats and collaborated with Brewer to establish a broad genetic foundation stock to develop the base of today's Pixie-bob. Frank Ditto attempted to patent the Pixie-bob in 1999, but his application was rejected by the United States Patent and Trademark Office. Successive litigation upheld the rejection.

== Breed registration ==
Led by Brewer, they succeeded in registering their new breed with The International Cat Association (TICA) and eventually the American Cat Fanciers Association (ACFA). The Pixie-bob was accepted into the "Exhibition" category by TICA in 1993, promoted to "New Breed and Colour" status in 1996 and eventually gained Championship status in 1998. The Pixie-bob was classified by TICA initially as a "Native New Breed", defined as "A new breed which has been identified through selection of phenotypically similar individuals from a naturally occurring population indigenous to a particular geographic region" but it is now classified as an established breed.

== Characteristics ==
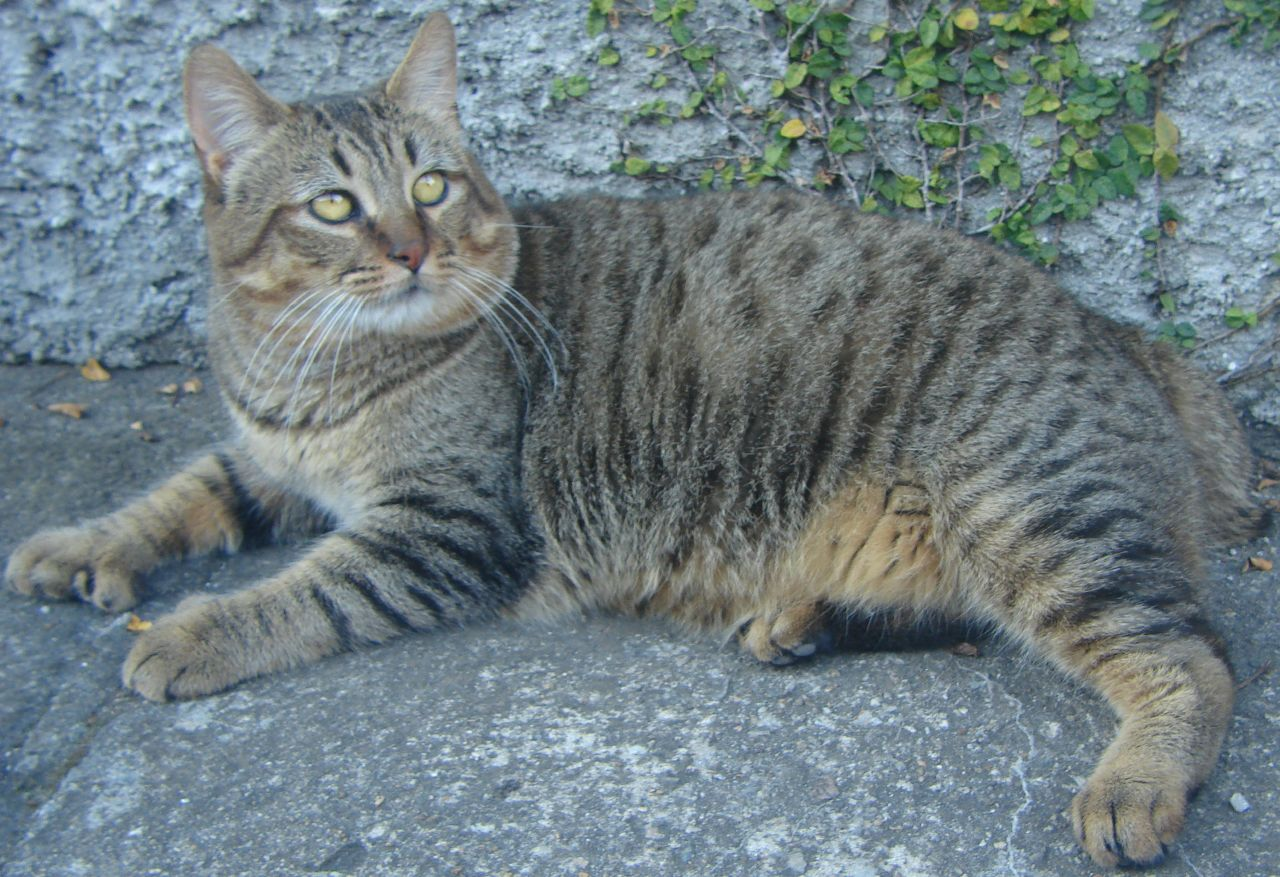
An adult Pixie-bob

=== Appearance ===
While the average domestic cat breed weighs about 3.5 kg (8 lb), Pixie-bobs can be somewhat larger, but (on average) usually do not exceed 5 kg (11 lb), similar to a medium- to large-sized domestic cat. Only very few breeders are regularly producing larger cats, which are generally large-boned, muscular and massive in form. Male Pixie-bobs are, most times, larger than females. Pixie-bobs grow for up to four years, instead of one year, like most domestic breeds.

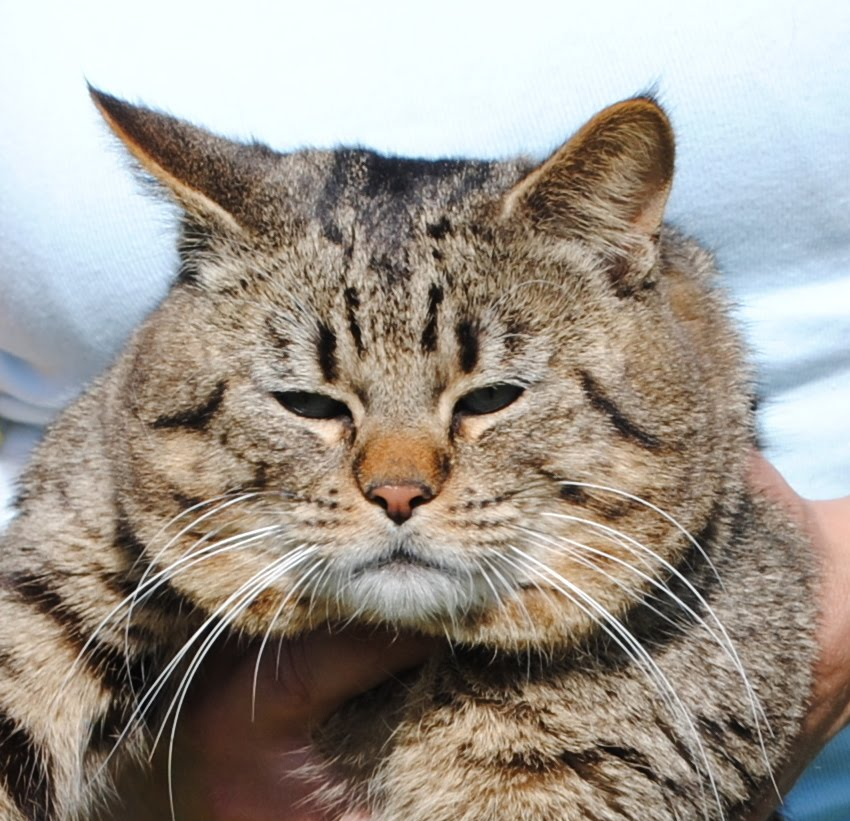
8-months-old male kitten close-up

Most Pixie-bobs are short-haired, though there exist a long-haired variety as well. Their black spotted tabby bobcat-like fur pattern often has reddish, apricot, and peach tones mixed-in. Most have black fur and skin on the bottom of their paws, with tipped ears, heavy ear-hair, black lips, and white fur around the eyes (but with black eye-skin). The brow should be heavy and the eyes should have a triangular shape. Eyes are blue when kittens, then change to green or gold when several months old. Their chins have white fur, but often have black skin underwear.

The head is pear-shaped and is considered to be the most important characteristic. Their muzzle is large, with rounded whisker pads and a red nose-leather. Some of their whiskers change from black (root – about 25%) to white (to the tip – about 75% of the whisker).

Tail size can range from 5 cm (2 in) to hock length when leg is extended. It is not presently known what genetic similarity there may be (or not) between the Pixie-bob and other breeds with suppressed tails, such as the Manx, American Bobtail, and Japanese Bobtail.

=== Behaviour ===
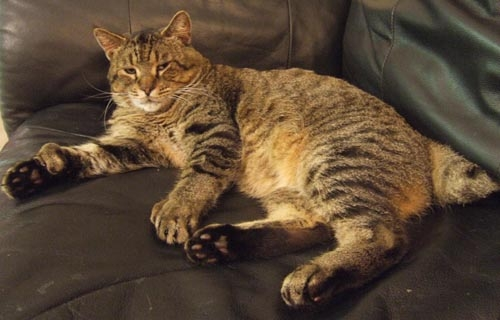
Adult its showing polydactyl front paws

Pixie-bobs are said to be highly intelligent, social, active, bold, and enjoy playing with other animals. They are also known for their "chirps", chatters, and growls; most meow scarcely if at all.

Most Pixie-bobs are highly sociable around both their owners and strangers. Almost all Pixie-bobs like to be in the same room as their owners, and will follow them around the house.

Other personality characteristics include the following:

- Head butting
- Ball fetching and playing
- Leash walking (for the most part)
- Highly intelligent
- Capable of understanding some words

== Health ==
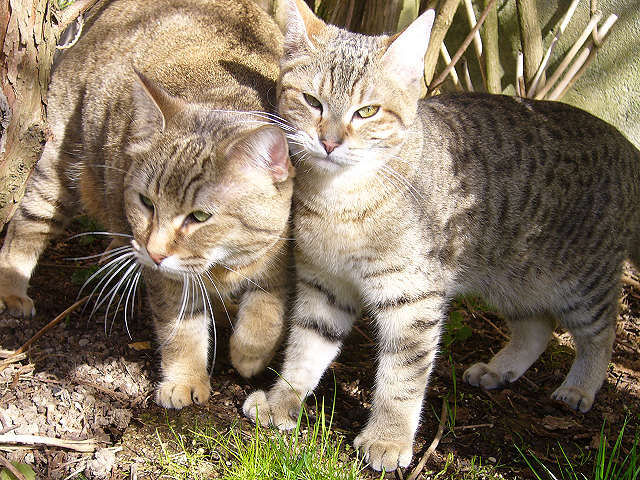
Two adults

As the breed is frequently outcrossed to "legend cats", Pixie-bobs are genetically diverse and are not prone to problems caused by inbreeding. Pixie-bob breeders use a pedigree disease database, Pawpeds, to ensure that health information can be recorded and monitored.

Some genetic conditions include the following:

- Cryptorchidism – only a few cases have been recorded in Pixie-bobs since the conception of this breed in the 1980s.
- Dystocia and cystic endometrial hyperplasia – A very small percentage of Pixie-bobs do suffer from delivery problems, and are removed from breeding.
- Hypertrophic cardiomyopathy (HCM) – Since the advent of the Pixie-bob breed in the 1980s, only a few cases have been reported. In some of those cases the Pixie-bob was cross-bred with other breeds of cats, such as Bengal and Maine Coon. In the majority of cases, HCM occurred spontaneously. HCM is hereditary in at least 50% of occurrences requiring annual ultrasound screens to continuously monitor the good health of the cats.
- Blocked tear ducts.

== See also ==
- Felid hybrids
- Polydactyl cat
