= American Cat Fanciers Association =

Cat pedigree and championship non-profit founded in 1955

- Abbreviation: ACFA
- Formation: 1955; 71 years ago
- Region served: United States and Canada
- Official language: English
- Website: https://acfacat.com/

The American Cat Fanciers Association (ACFA) is an American non-profit organization formed with the intent of allowing greater flexibility in the development of pedigreed domestic cats. The ACFA allows registration of purebred, pedigreed cats, experimental breeds of cats, and household pet cats.

ACFA recognizes 70 breeds for championship competition. ACFA sanctioned cat shows include classes for registered kittens ages 4-8 months, for cats from an experimental breed or a new color, championship unaltered adult cats, championship altered cats, and a household pet class for mixed-breed or pedigreed cats who don't meet the breed standard.

All classes except household pet class are judged based on their adherence to the breed standard, while the household pet class is judged according to the cats' health, personality and cleanliness. Wins from licensed shows can be used to claim titles including championships and multiple championships, grand championships and multiple grand championships, and the household pet titles of Royal Household Pet and Supreme Household Pet.

ACFA is directly affiliated with the Cat Aficionado Association of China, who use the ACFA breed standards.

== History ==
ACFA was founded in 1955 in the Dallas and Fort Worth area. It was created by a group of cat fanciers desiring to show their cats in an association where individual members had voting rights on election of officers, acceptance of new show rules, by-laws and breed standards and acceptance of new breeds of cats. Over the years, ACFA introduced other innovations, such as a championship class for altered cats, a new judging system utilizing deductive points and regular judging schools for all judges.

== List of ACFA recognized cat breeds ==
As of 2025, ACFA has issued standards for these breeds.

- Abyssinian
- American Bobtail
- American Curl
- American shorthair
- American Wirehair
- Aphrodite
- Australian Mist
- Balinese
- Bengal
- Birman
- Bombay
- British Shorthair and longhair as separate breeds.
- Burmese and the European Burmese as a separate breed.
- Burmilla
- Chartreux
- Cornish Rex
- Cymric
- Devon Rex
- Egyptian Mau
- Exotic
- Havana
- Highlander
- Himalayan
- Japanese Bobtail
- Khao Manee
- Korat
- Kurilian Bobtail
- LaPerm
- Lykoi
- Maine Coon cat
- Manx
- Nebelung
- Norwegian Forest Cat
- Ocicat
- Oriental Shorthair/Oriental Longhair
- Persian
- Peterbald
- Pixie-bob
- RagaMuffin
- Ragdoll
- Russian Blue
- Russian Shorthair
- Scottish Fold
- Selkirk Rex
- Siamese
- Siberian
- Singapura
- Snowshoe
- Somali
- Sphynx
- Tonkinese
- Toybob
- Turkish Angora
- Turkish Van

== See also ==
- List of cat registries
- List of cat breeds
- List of experimental cat breeds
