= Manx cat =

Breed of cat

Manx
- A male "riser" Manx
- Other names: Manks
- Common nicknames: Stubbin, rumpy
- Origin: Isle of Man

Breed standards
- CFA: standard
- FIFe: standard
- TICA: standard
- WCF: standard
- FFE: standard
- ACF: standard
- ACFA/CAA: standard
- CCA-AFC: standard
- CCC of A: standard
- CFF: standard
- GCCF: standard
- LOOF: standard
- NZCF: standard
- SACC: standard
- Other: AACE

Notes
- Long-haired or semi-long-haired specimens are considered a separate breed, the Cymric, in some registries.

The Manx cat (/ˈmæŋks/, in earlier times often spelled Manks) is a breed of domestic cat (Felis catus) originating on the Isle of Man, with a mutation that shortens the tail. Many Manx have a small stub of a tail, but Manx cats are best known as being entirely tailless; this is the most distinguishing characteristic of the breed, along with elongated hind legs and a rounded head. Manx cats come in all coat colours and patterns, though all-white specimens are rare, and the coat range of the original stock was more limited. Long-haired variants are sometimes considered a separate breed, the Cymric cat.

Manx are prized as skilled hunters, and thus have often been sought by farmers with rodent problems, and been a preferred ship's cat breed. They are said to be social, tame and active. Two local terms for the cats on their home island are stubbin (those with a short tail) and rumpy (those with no tail). Manx have been exhibited in cat shows since the 1800s, with the first known breed standard published in 1903.

== History ==
=== Origin and folklore ===
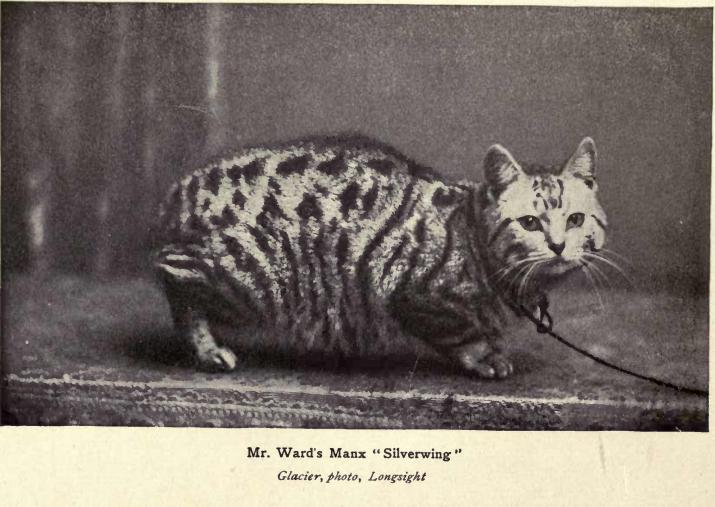
Silverwing, a tabby, rumpy Manx male champion show cat (UK, 1902)

Tailless cats, then called stubbin (apparently both singular and plural) in colloquial Manx language, were known by the early 19th century as cats from the Isle of Man, hence the name, where they remain a substantial but declining percentage of the local cat population. Some folklore stories claim that tailless domestic cats were brought there by sea. They are descended from mainland stock of obscure origin. Like all house cats, including nearby British and Irish populations, they are ultimately descended from the African wildcat (Felis lybica) and not from native European wildcats (Felis silvestris), of which the island has long been devoid.

The dominant trait of taillessness arises from a spontaneous mutation, the Manx taillessness gene, that eventually became common on the island because of the limited genetic diversity of island biogeography (an example of the founder effect and, at the sub-specific level, of the species-area curve).

In the Manx language, the modern name of the breed is kayt Manninagh, literally 'cat of Mann' (plural kiyt or kit), or kayt cuttagh lit. 'bob-tailed cat'. Kayt, used as both a masculine and feminine noun, is also encountered as cayt, and depending on the exact construction, it may be lenited as chayt or gayt. The diminutive word is pishin or pishyn, 'kitten' (with various plurals). Manx itself was often spelled Manks in English well into the late 1800s.

There are numerous folktales about the Manx cat, all of them of "relatively recent origin"; they are focused entirely on the lack of a tail, and are devoid of religious, philosophical, or mythical aspects found in the traditional Irish–Norse folklore of the native Manx culture, and in legends about cats from other parts of the world.

The name of the promontory Spanish Head on the coast of the island is often thought to have arisen from the local tale of a ship of the Spanish Armada foundering in the area, though there is no evidence to suggest this actually occurred. Folklore has further claimed that a tailless cat swam ashore from said shipwreck, and thus brought the trait to the island. However, tailless cats are not commonly known in Spain, even if such a shipwreck were proven.

Regardless of the genetic and historical reality, there are various fanciful Lamarckian folktales that seek to explain why the Manx has a truncated tail. In one of them, the biblical Noah closed the door of the Ark when it began to rain, and accidentally cut off the tail of the Manx cat who had almost been left behind. Over the years a number of cartoons have appeared on postcards from the Isle of Man showing scenes in which a cat's tail is being run over and severed by a variety of means including a motorcycle, a reference to motorcycle racing being popular on the island, and an update of the Noah story. Because the gene is so dominant and "invades" other breeds when crossed (often without owner knowledge) with the Manx, there was a folk belief that simply being in the proximity of a Manx cat could cause other breeds to somehow produce tailless kittens.

Another genetically impossible account claimed that the Manx was the hybrid offspring of a cat and a rabbit, purporting to explain why it has no or little tail, long hind legs and a sometimes hopping gait. The cat-rabbit halfbreed tale has been further reinforced by the more widespread "cabbit" folktale.

Populations of tailless cats also exist in a few other places in Europe, most notably Cornwall, only 250 miles (400 km) from the Isle of Man. A population on the small, isolated Danish peninsula (former island) of Reersø in the Great Belt may be due to the arrival on the island of cats of Manx origin, by ship. Similar cats are also found in Crimea, a near-island peninsula in the Black Sea, though whether they are genetically related to maritime Manx cats or are a coincidentally similar result of insular genetic diversity limitations, like the unrelated Kuril Islands Bobtail, Karelian Bobtail, Japanese Bobtail, and Indonesian Raas cats, is unknown. The Manx gene may be related to the similarly dominant tail suppression gene of the recent American Bobtail breed, but Manx, Japanese Bobtails and other short-tailed cats are not used in its breeding program, and the mutation seems to have appeared in the breed spontaneously. Possible relation to the Pixie-bob breed, which also ranges from rumpy to fully tailed, is unknown.

== Breed recognition ==
Manx cats have been exhibited in cat shows, as a named, distinct breed (and with the modern spelling "Manx"), since the late 1800s. In that era, few shows provided a Manx division, and exhibited specimens were usually entered under the "Any Other Variety" class, where they often could not compete well unless "exceptionally good in size and markings". Early pet breeding and showing expert Charles Henry Lane, himself the owner of a prize-winning rare white rumpy Manx named Lord Luke, published the first known (albeit informal) breed standard for the Manx in his 1903 Rabbits, Cats and Cavies, but noted that already by the time of his writing "if the judge understood the variety" a Manx would be clearly distinguishable from some other tailless cat being exhibited, "as the make of the animal, its movements and its general character are all distinctive." Not all cat experts of the day were favourable toward the breed; in The Cat: Its Points and Management in Health and Disease, Frank Townend Barton wrote in 1908: "There is nothing whatever to recommend the breed, whilst the loss of the tail in no way enhances its beauty."

The Manx was one of the first breeds recognised by the Cat Fanciers' Association (CFA) (the predominant United States–based pedigreed cat registry, founded in 1908), which has records on the breed in North America going back to the 1920s.

== Characteristics ==
=== Appearance ===
==== Tail (or lack thereof) ====
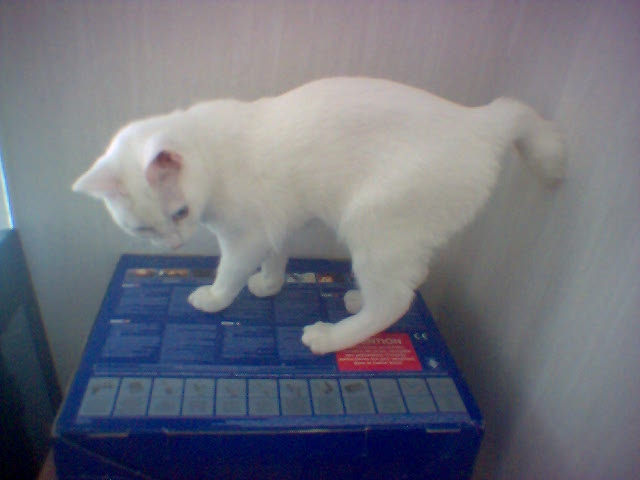
A longy white Manx female

Although tail suppression (or tail length variety) is not the sole characteristic feature of the breed, the chief defining one of the Manx cat is its absence of a tail to having a tail of long length, or tail of any length between the two extremes. This is a cat body-type mutation of the spine, caused by a dominant gene. As with the sometimes-tail-suppressed Schipperke dog and Old English Sheepdog, tail suppression does not "breed true" in Manx cats. Attempting to force the tailless trait to breed true by continually breeding tailless Manx cats to tailless Manx cats has led to increased negative, even fatal genetic disorders (see below). Tail length is random throughout a litter of kittens. Manx to non-Manx breeding will usually produce some Manx-type tail varieties in kittens. Whether the shorter tailed kittens of these varieties are labelled Manx is up to the breed standard consulted. Manx cats' tails are classified according to proportional tail length as kittens (the proportion does not change after birth):

- Rumpy (rumpie) or dimple rumpy – having no tail at all, though often a small tuft of hair where the tail would have grown from the rump
- Riser or rumpy riser – having a bump of cartilage under the fur, most noticeable when the animal is happy and raising its tail end
- Stumpy (stumpie) – having a partial tail of vestigial, fused vertebrae, up to about 3 cm (1 in) long
- Stubby (stubbie), shorty, or short-tailed – having a short tail of non-fused bones, up to about half an average cat tail
- Longy (longie), tailed, or taily (tailie) – having a half- to normal-length tail.

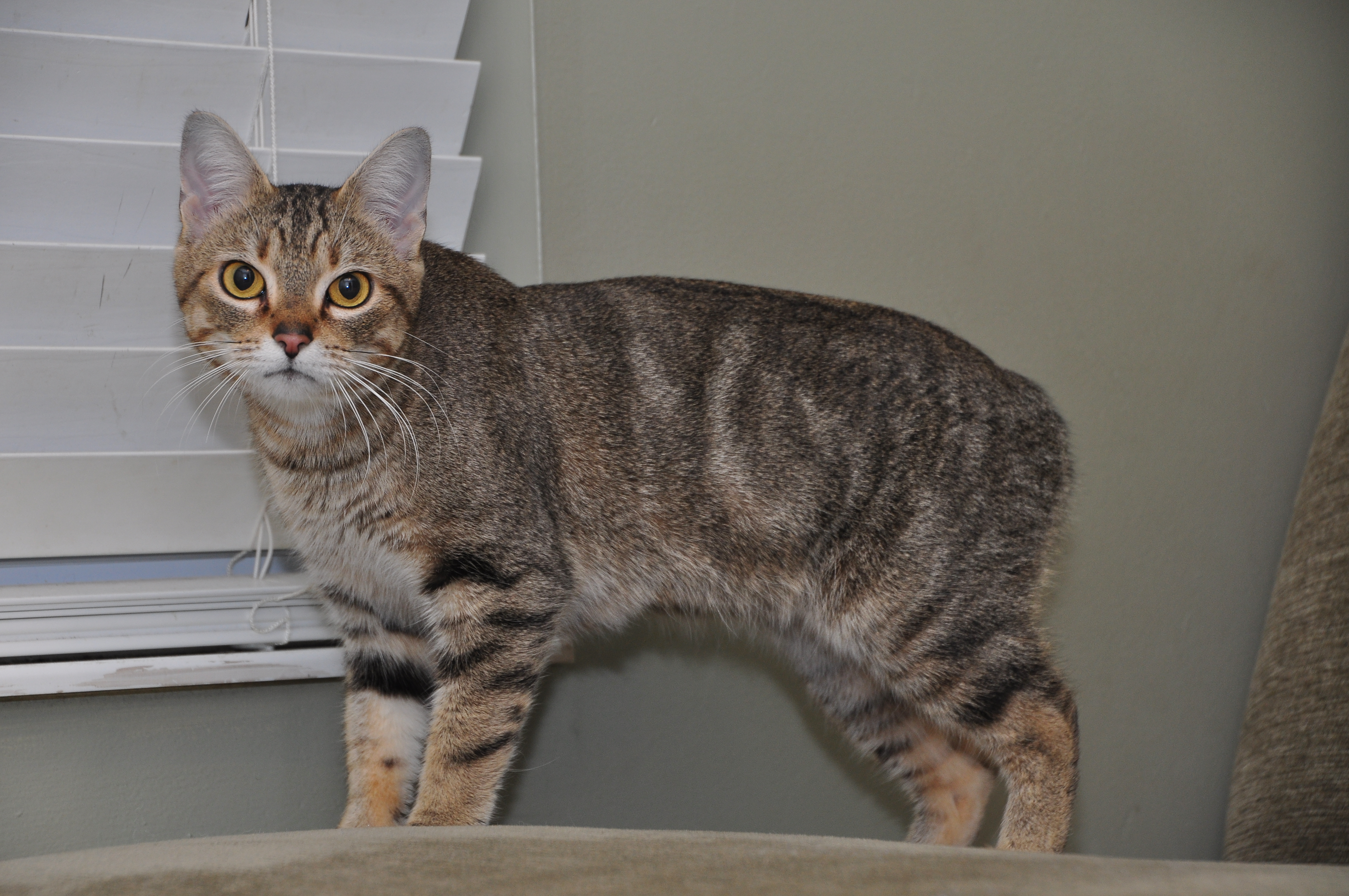
A "rumpy" Manx kitten

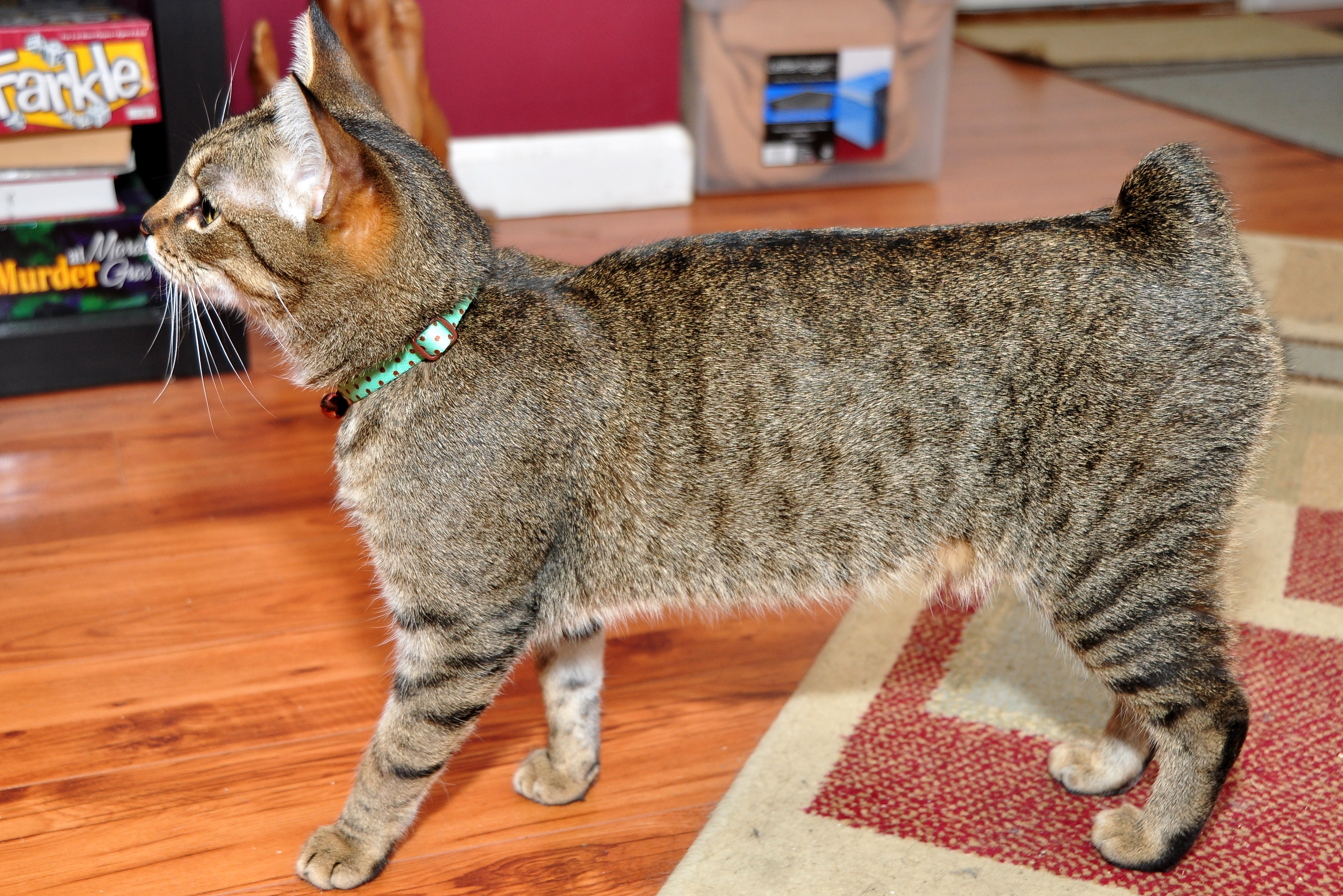
A "rumpy riser" tail example

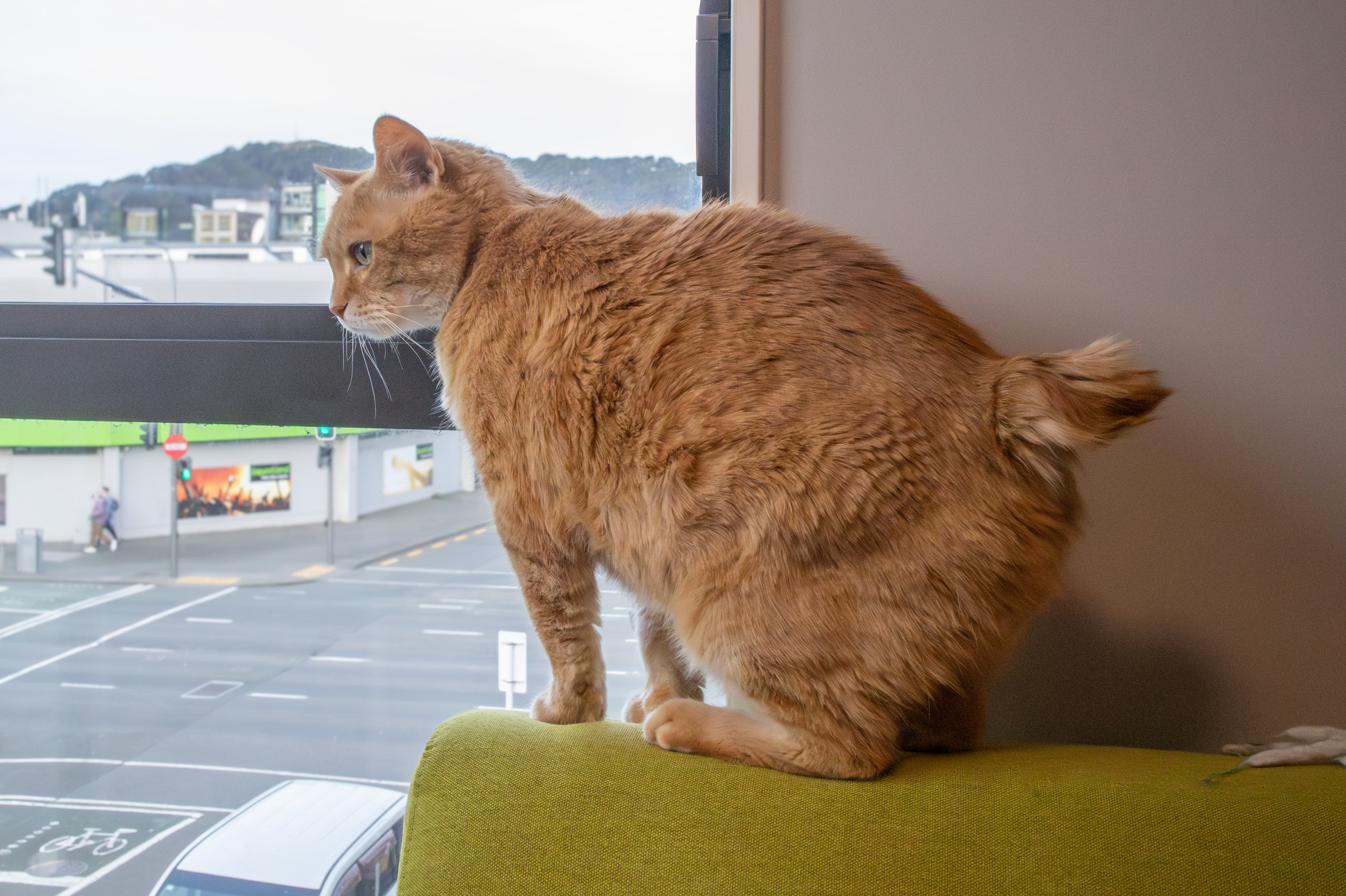
A "stumpy" tail Manx cat

Since the early days of breed recognition in the late 19th century, Manx show cats have been rumpy through stumpy specimens, with stubby and longy Manx not qualifying to be shown except in the "Any Other Variety" or household pet class. Kittens with complete tails may be born in a purebred Manx litter, having not inherited the taillessness appearance at all. Depending on the country and cat organisation referenced, rumpy, rumpy risers and stumpies are the only Manx cat tail types that fit the breed standard for Manx cats. The longer cat tail lengths seen in some Manx cats are considered a breed fault, although they occur as naturally in the breed, but not as often, as the shorter tails. Although these longer tail types are of purebred Manx ancestry, they do not possess the dominant gene so cannot pass it on. However, since the Manx tail mutation gene is dominant, these longer-tailed purebred Manx cats may still be used in breeding programs and may even be considered in an effort to help avoid the fatal spinal deformities that sometimes result in tailless Manx cats.

The Manx breed is genetically distinct from the Japanese Bobtail breed, another naturally occurring insular breed. The Japanese Bobtail always has at least some tail, ranging from a small "pom" to a stubby but distinct tail, which is kinked or curled and usually has a slightly bulbous and fluffy appearance; by contrast, the Manx has a straight tail when one is present at all. The Japanese Bobtail has a markedly different appearance from the Manx, and is characterised by almond-shaped eyes, a triangular face, long ears, and lean body, like many other Asian breeds. The gene responsible for the bobbed or kinked tail in that breed is recessive and unrelated to the dominant Manx tail-suppression gene; the bobtail gene is not connected to any serious deformities, while the tail-suppression gene can, under certain conditions, give rise to a pattern of sometimes lethal health problems. The Pixie-bob breed also has a short tail, and may be genetically related to the Manx. More will be clear about tail genetics as more genetic studies are done on cat populations and as DNA testing improves; most domestic animal genetic work has been done with dogs and livestock breeds.

Manx (and other tail-suppressed breeds) do not exhibit problems with balance; balance is controlled primarily by the inner ear. In cats, dogs and other large-bodied mammals, balance involves but is not dependent upon the tail (contrast with rats, for whom the tail is a quite significant portion of their body mass).

Since Manx kittens are naturally born with any tail length, from none to long, it was formerly common to surgically dock the longer tails a few days after birth. Although illegal in many jurisdictions (including much of Europe), the practice was formerly recommended, although with the caveat that the commonness of the practice meant that many spurious Manx cats – i.e., random British cats – were altered to resemble the Manx, to defraud unwary buyers.

==== Body and legs ====
Manx are medium-sized cats, broad-chested with sloping shoulders and flat sides, and in show condition are firmly muscular and lean, neither bulky nor fatty. Lane reported the original, native breed as ranging typically from 4.5 to 5.5 kg (10 to 12 lb) for males and 3.5 to 4.5 kg (8 to 10 lb) for females, with many smaller examples but only rare ones larger. The hind legs of Manx are notably longer than the fore legs, causing the rump to be higher than the shoulder and creating a continuous arch from shoulders to rump giving the cat an overall rounded or humped appearance, though the breed is comparatively long when stretched out. The fore legs are strong and straight. The shape is often described as rabbit-like.

==== Head ====
Manx cats' heads are rounded in shape, and medium in depth with a long neck. The upright, round-tipped and front-facing ears are largish. The eyes are large, rounded, and prominent, with their outer corners higher than the inner ones. Absent any bloodlines with a dominant alternative eye colour (such as blue in Siamese or related ancestry), Manx often have some hue variant of gold eyes, and for show purposes follow the eye colour standards of the same coat colour/pattern in non-Manx short-hairs.

==== Coat ====
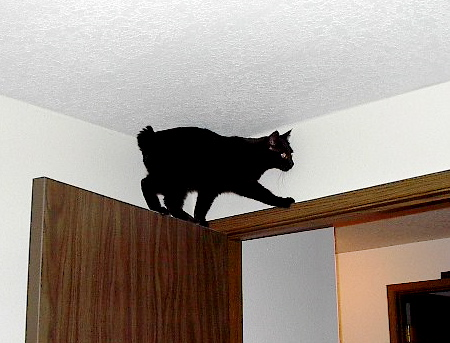
Short-haired stumpy black Manx

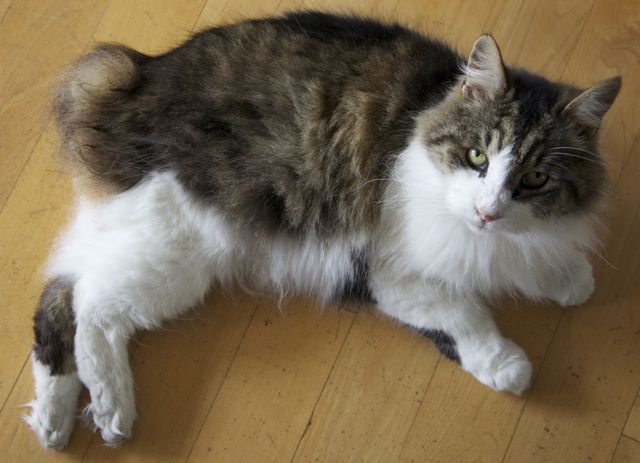
Long-haired Manx (Cymric)

Manx cats exhibit two coat lengths. Short- or long-haired, all Manx have a thick, double-layered coat. The colour and pattern ranges exhibited should conform to the standards for that type of coat in non-Manx.

The more common short-haired Manx – the original breed – has a coat with a dense, soft, under layer and a longer, coarse outer layer with guard hairs. The overall appearance of the coat is fine, short and lying close to the skin, versus fluffy or voluminous.

The long-haired Manx, known to some cat registries as the Cymric, has a silky-textured double coat of medium length, with "breeches" (i.e. a distinct jump in fur length at the hocks giving the appearance of old-fashioned, baggy, knee-length pants ) belly ruff and neck ruff, tufts of fur between the toes and full "ear furnishings" (hairs in ears). The CFA considers the Cymric to be a variety of Manx and judges it in the short-hair division even though it is long-haired, while The International Cat Association (TICA) judges it in the long-hair division as a distinct Cymric breed. The long-haired variety is of comparatively recent development. Lane wrote in 1903 that the Manx "to the best of my knowledge, information and belief, does not include any long-haired specimens", in his detailed chapter on the breed.

Regardless of coat length, the colours and coat patterns occurring in the breed today run the gamut of virtually all breeds due to extensive cross-breeding, though not all registries may accept all coats as qualifying for breeding or show. The most common coats are tabby, tortoiseshell, calico and solid colours. Widely divergent Manx specimens, including even a colour-point, blue-eyed, long-haired variant of evident Himalayan ancestry, have been celebrated on Isle of Man postage stamps since the 1980s, and recent publications often show marbled and spotted varieties. The original insular stock, however, were of less widespread variation. Lane, having "seen a great many of them" wrote of Manx cats that "[i]t is curious that the colours in this variety seem somewhat limited" and that the breed "does not comprise all the colours usually associated with other short-haired varieties". He reported only very common orange, common orange and white, common cream tabby, uncommon tortoiseshell, and very rare all-white specimens in 1903. Calico and point-coloured are notably absent from this list, as are even today's common colourful tabbies; overall, coat colours of the original insular stock around 1900 were phaeomelanin-dominated, with a marked presence of bicolour alleles, and with eumelanin and/or all-white colouration possibly only due to modern introductions. However, writing in England only five years later, Barton suggested that "the Manx may be of any colour, but probably orange is the most frequently met with."

Specific registries have particular, and differing, standards of points with regard to colouration and patterning. For example, the Governing Council of the Cat Fancy (GCCF) classifies the Manx as a variant of the British Shorthair (BSH), and thus requires that Manx cats to have one of the coat patterns that would be permissible in the BSH rather than any that is exclusive to a "foreign" type (e.g. point colouration). New Zealand Cat Fancy (NZCF) does likewise for colour and markings, but requires a double-coat and other Manx-specific features that GCCF does not. Some other registries are even more restrictive, while others are more liberal.

=== Behaviour ===
Fanciers often describe the Manx as being doglike in behaviour.

These beliefs about the Manx's behaviour were not described in the past. Lane's early and experienced account of the temperament of this "variety, which is quaint and interesting" is simply that they were "docile, good-tempered and sociable", and that a prize specimen should be "an alert, active animal of much power and energetic character."

Manx are prized as hunters, and were thus long in demand for working roles like farm cat (Manx: lughder or lugher 'mouser', from lugh 'mouse') and ship's cat (screeberagh or screeberey loosely 'scratcher, scratchy-one', from screebagh or screebey 'scratching, scratchy, scraping').

== Variants (sub-breeds) ==
Four new, consistent varieties have been developed from the Manx (the original version of which is now sometimes consequently called the Shorthair Manx). These are the Cymric (Longhair Manx), the Isle of Man Shorthair and Isle of Man Longhair, and the Tasman Manx, though only the Cymric has garnered widespread acceptance in breed registries as of 2014.

=== Cymric (Manx Longhair) ===
The Cymric or Manx Longhair is a tailless or partially tailed cat of Manx stock, with semi-long to long hair, e.g. as the result of cross-breeding with Himalayan, Persian and other longer-haired breeds early in its development. While its name refers to Wales (Cymru), the breed was actually developed in Canada, which has honoured the breed with a commemorative 50-cent coin in 1999.

Simply covering it in their Manx breed standards, the US-based Cat Fanciers' Association (CFA), the Co-ordinating Cat Council of Australia (CCCA), and the UK's Governing Council of the Cat Fancy (GCCF) recognise the variety as a longer-haired Manx rather than "Cymric" (the CFA and CCCA call it the Manx Longhair, while GCCF uses the term Semi-longhair Manx Variant). The majority of cat registries have explicit Cymric standards (published separately or along with Manx). Of the major registries, only the Feline Federation Europe (FFE) does not recognise the breed or sub-breed at all, under any name, as of October 2014 (their Manx standard was last updated 17 May 2004).

=== Isle of Man Shorthair (tailed) ===
Resembling the British Shorthair, the Isle of Man Shorthair is essentially a fully tailed Manx cat. That is, it is a cat of Manx stock, with Manx features, but without any expression of the Manx taillessness gene. As of March 2013, it is only recognised by New Zealand Cat Fancy (NZCF) with its own breed standard. Any coat colour and pattern acceptable in the British Shorthair is permissible in the IoM Shorthair (the same restriction is applied to the Manx in the NZCF standard), and it requires the double coat of the Manx. In other international registries (e.g. GCCF, who also treat Manx as a British Shorthair variant), such cats are designated "Tailed Manx" and only recognised as Manx breeding stock (they are important as such, since breeding two tailless Manx together results in birth defects), and cannot be show cats.

=== Isle of Man Longhair (tailed) ===
Essentially a fully tailed Cymric cat, i.e., a cat of Cymric (and thus Manx) stock, the Isle of Man Longhair has Cymric features, but without expression of the Manx taillessness gene. As of March 2013, it is only recognised as a separate breed by NZCF with a breed standard. Coat colours are limited to those acceptable in the British Shorthair, and requires the double, thick, long coat of the Cymric.

=== Tasman Manx (curly-coated) ===
Named after Tasman Sea between Australia and New Zealand, the Tasman Manx is a tailless or partially tailed Manx cat with a curly-haired coat not unlike that of a Selkirk Rex, due a recessive mutation which arose in Manx litters in both Australia and New Zealand. As of March 2013, the breed is only recognised by the NZCF and the Catz Inc. registry (also of New Zealand) with breed standards. The coat may be short or semi-long.

The type arose possibly without existing rex mutation bloodlines (and none of the rex breeds are permitted as out-cross partners with Tasman Manx in Catz breeding guidelines). Depending on length of tail (if any) and coat, kittens may sometimes be termed "Tasman Cymric", "Tasman Isle of Man Shorthair" or "Tasman Isle of Man Longhair", but these are not considered separate breeds. The term "Tasman Rex" has been applied to cats with this gene that do not fall into one of the previously mentioned labels (lacking the Manx face and body shape to qualify), though relation if any to extant Rex mutation breeds is unclear. All of these additional terms beyond "Tasman Manx" appear to be "recognised", even promulgated by NZCF but without breed standards, and even the permissive Catz registry does not include them as of July 2014.

== Health and genetics ==
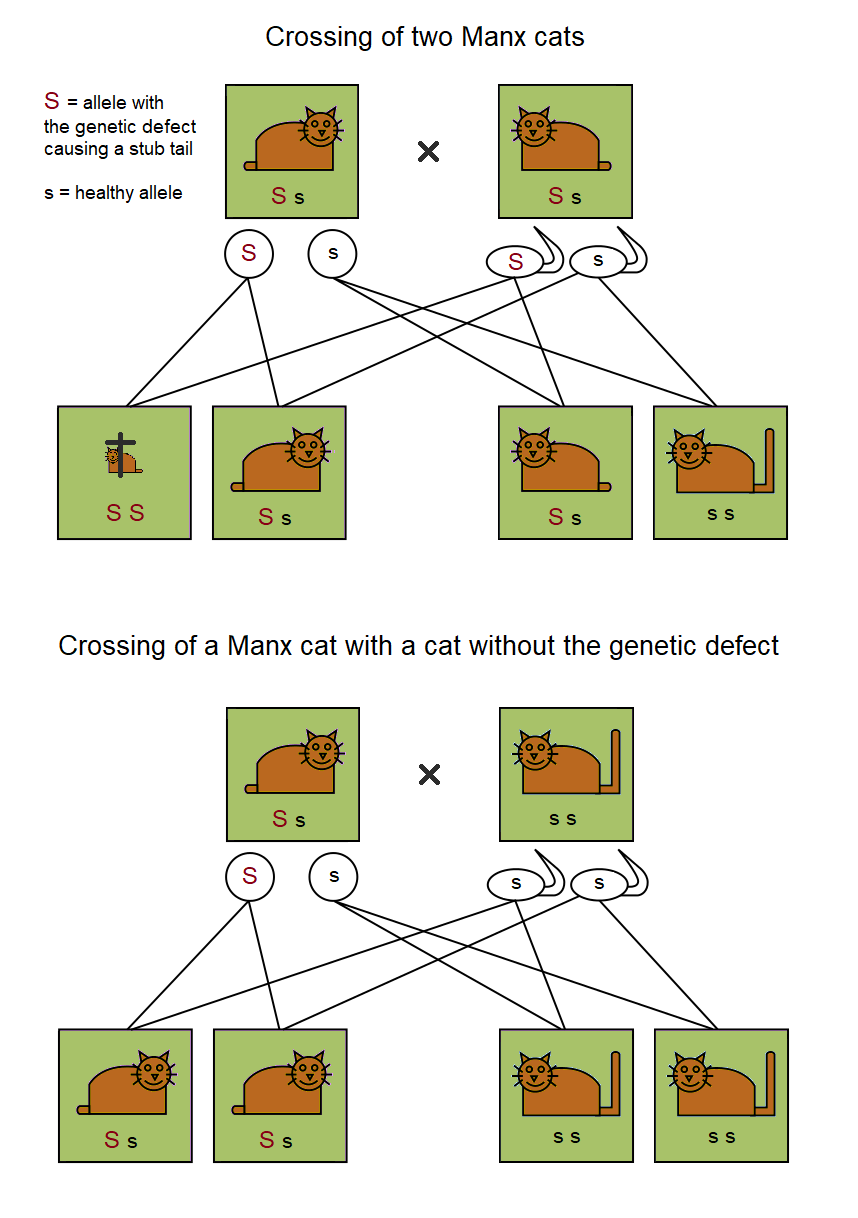

The Manx taillessness gene is dominant and highly penetrant; kittens from two Manx parents are generally born without any tail. Being homozygous for (having two copies of) the gene is usually lethal in utero, resulting in miscarriage. Thus, tailless cats can carry only one copy of the gene. Because of the danger of having two copies of the taillessness gene, breeders avoid breeding two entirely tailless Manx cats together. Because neither parent carries the tailless allele, a fully tailed Manx bred to another fully tailed Manx results in all fully tailed kittens.

Some partial tails are prone to a form of arthritis that causes the cat severe pain, and in rare cases Manx-bred kittens are born with kinked short tails because of incomplete growth of the tail during development. Stumpy to long tails are sometimes docked at birth as a preventative measure.

"Manx syndrome" or "Manxness" is a colloquial name given to the condition which results when the tailless gene shortens the spine too much. It can seriously damage the spinal cord and the nerves, causing a form of spina bifida, as well as problems with the bowels, bladder, and digestion. Very small bladders are indicative of the disease, and it is often difficult to diagnose. Death can occur quite suddenly, and some live for only 3–4 years; the oldest recorded was a female cat named Pharrah at seven years when affected with the disease. In one report, it was shown to affect about 30% of Manx cats studied, but nearly all of those cases were rumpies, which exhibit the most extreme phenotype. Feline expert Roger Tabor has stated: "Only the fact that the Manx is a historic breed stops us being as critical of this dangerous gene as of other more recent selected abnormalities."

The breed is also predisposed to rump fold intertrigo, and to corneal dystrophy. In a review of over 5,000 cases of urate urolithiasis the Manx was noticeably under-represented, with an odds ratio of 0.35.

Some tailless cats such as the Manx cats may develop megacolon, which is a recurring condition causing constipation that can be life-threatening to the cat if not properly monitored. It is a condition in which, due to absence of a tail, the smooth muscle that normally contracts to push stools toward the rectum loses its ability to do so.

Following on updated genetic research, both the Australian Cat Federation and (less stringently) the GCCF impose special breeding restrictions on Manx cats (and derived stock like the Cymric), for animal welfare reasons.

=== Identification of the Manx Cat tailless gene ===
In 2013, prior to initiation of the Manx Cat Genome Project (below), genetic mutations in the brachyury gene were shown to be responsible for failure of tail development in the Manx cat, as well as four other tailless breeds of cat. Mutations in orthologs of this gene have been shown to cause tail-loss defects in a number of other species, notably the mouse. Mutations in the human version of the brachyury gene are associated with a range of neural tube defects.

=== Manx Cat Genome Project ===
To better understand the genetics of the breed, the Manx Cat Genome Project (MCGP) was launched in August 2015, as a crowdfunded volunteer project by computational biologist Dr. Rachel Glover of Douglas, Isle of Man, to perform the first whole genome sequencing of the Manx cat, uncovering the genetic mutations that make the Manx distinct from other cat populations, and to contribute data to the genome databases at the 99 Lives Cat Genome Sequencing Project by the University of Missouri, and the US National Center for Biotechnology Information (NCBI). It is the Isle of Man's first gene sequencing programme, with samples collected and data analysed by MCGP in the Isle of Man, with the input of scientists around the world, initial sequencing work being performed by the firm Edinburgh Genomics and the University of Edinburgh in Scotland and by 99 Lives, and server resources donated by Isle of Man biomedical information technology company ServiceTech.

The project aims to answer four questions:

1. Which mutations are unique to the breed, aside from the obvious suppressed tail?
2. What genes are involved in Manx syndrome?
3. What genes control tail length? (The Manx taillessness gene only determines whether the tail will be suppressed, not the extent of suppression.)
4. Is there a genetic basis for any health problems associated with the breed other than Manx syndrome?

One desired result of this research is the development of tests that can be used to keep the breed healthy by identifying cats which should not be bred. A minimum of three cats' genes will have to be sequenced to obtain the required genetic data.

After the initial fundraising goal was reached in December 2015, the first cat sequenced was a purebred Manx calico rumpy named Bonnag, selected because the registry of this dam (breeding female) and her kittens in the British Governing Council of the Cat Fancy (GCCF) aids controlled study of a specific bloodline. Bonnag's samples were sent for sequencing in April 2016, with raw gene sequence results received by MCGP in August 2016; the laborious process of genome assembly has begun, to be followed by comparison with previously collected cat genomic data from 99 Lives, and eventual peer-reviewed publication of the results in a scientific journal. Fundraising for the second genome to be sequenced by the project began September 2016; costs dropped to UK£1,400 per cat in November 2015, and as of April 2016 dropped to about £1,200, using the Illumina HiSeq X Ten sequencer, down from original projections of £10,000 before the X Ten was available for non-human sequencing. The dramatic drop in costs allowed the first cat's sequencing to be done well ahead of the original schedule. MCGP has already identified the location of the mutation responsible for suppression of Bonnag's tail, the deletion of a single bit of genetic data among 2.8 billion making up the genome.

The selected second sample is from a kitten that had to be euthanised for Manx syndrome, and it is hoped that this new sequence can identify the genetic specifics of the condition and why it only affects some offspring.

== In popular culture ==
=== Isle of Man national symbol ===
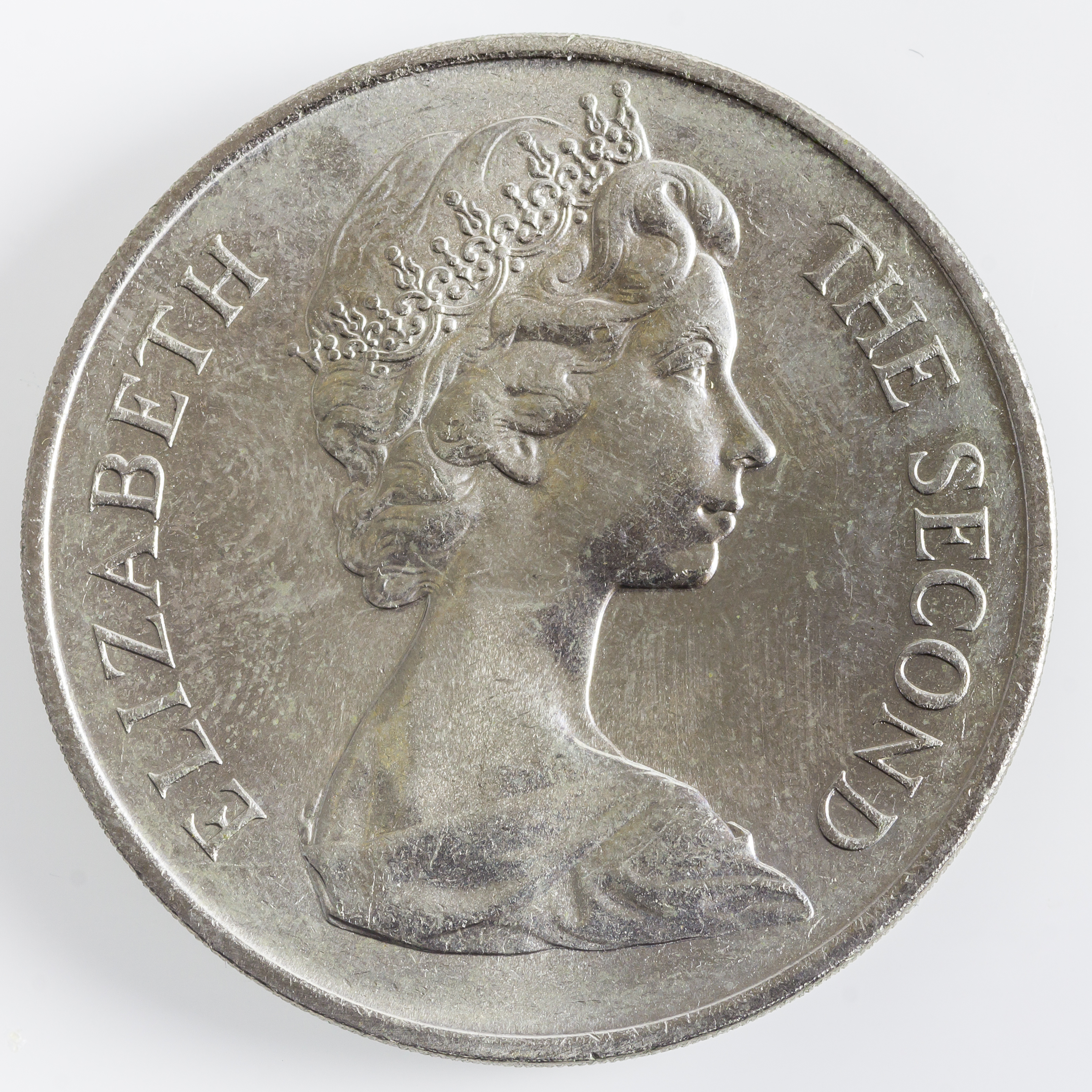
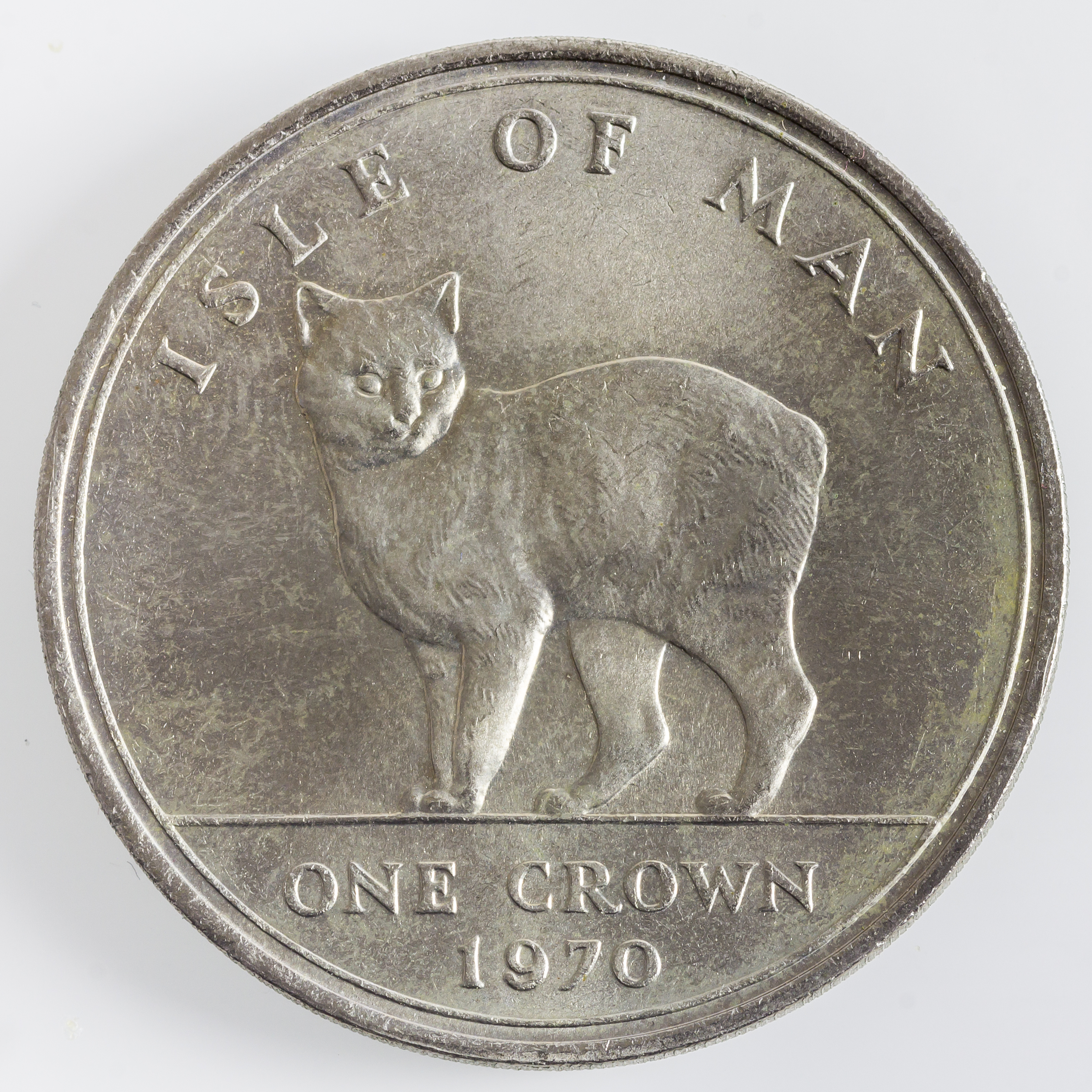
Manx cat on 1970 crown

The Isle of Man uses the Manx cat as one of the symbols of the island nation and its unique culture. On Isle of Man currency, Manx cats are the subject of the reverse of four special commemorative crown coins. The first two, issued in 1970 and 1975, are stand-alone releases in both copper-nickel and silver proofs, while the third, in 1988, inaugurated an ongoing series of annual cat coin issues that have also been produced in gold in various sizes; an almost-hidden Manx cat appears in the background on each of the 1989-onward releases featuring other breeds. A Manx, with a kitten, was the featured cat again in 2012.

A Manx cat, in stylised Celtic knotwork art, also appears on the island's 1980–83 penny. The breed figures on numerous Isle of Man postage stamps, including a 2011 series of six that reproduce the art from Victorian era Manx cat postcards, a 1996 one-stamp decorative sheetlet, one stamp in a 1994 tourism 10-stamp booklet, a 1996 five-stamp series of Manx cats around the world, and a 1989 set of the breed in various coat patterns, plus two high-value definitives of 1983 and 1989. The cat appears prominently as the subject of a large number of tourist goods and Manx pride items available on the island and over the Internet, serving (along with the triskelion and the four-horned Manx Loaghtan sheep) as an emblem of the Isle of Man.

=== Television ===
The character Stimpy from the American animated comedy series The Ren & Stimpy Show is a Manx cat.
