= Highlander cat =

Breed of cat

Highlander
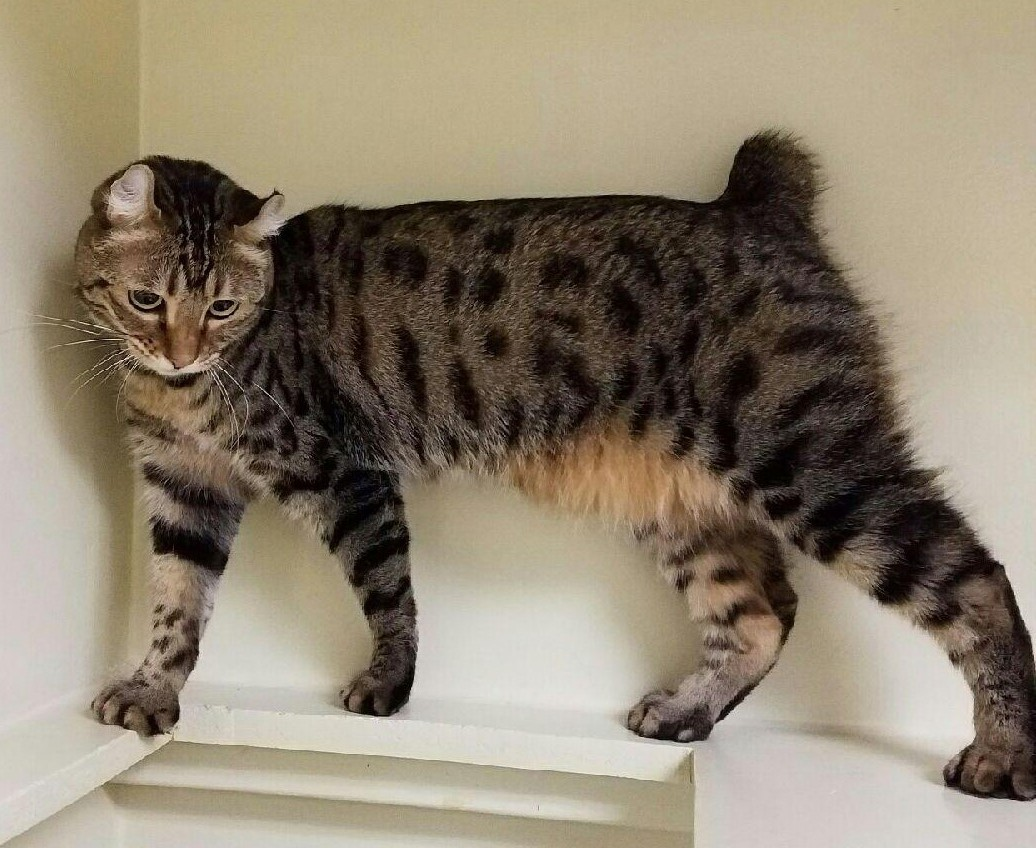
- Other names: Highlander Shorthair
- Foundation bloodstock: Domestic cats with shorttails and 1 curled cat from Canada

Breed standards
- TICA: standard
- ACFA/CAA: standard

Notes
- As of May 1, 2025, the Highlander Shorthair and Highlander Longhair breed is a recognized championship breed in TICA, ACFA, CFF and LCWW. The Highland Lynx is not recognized as part of the Highlander breed and that name was discontinued in 2004. It is not used in conjunction with the Highlander breed.

The Highlander (also known as the Highlander Shorthair, and originally as the Highland Lynx) is a new breed of cat. The unique appearance of the Highlander comes from the deliberate cross between the Desert Lynx and the Jungle Curl breeds, also recently developed.

== Description ==
The Highlander originated as a crossbreed of the experimental Desert Lynx breed and the Jungle Curl breed, to add the latter's curled ears to the former. They are bobtailed or short-tailed, have spotted or classic bullseye markings, mackerel and resemble the bobcat. The Highlander has a long sloping forehead and blunt muzzle with a very wide nose. The eyes are wide-set and the ears are upright with a slight curl and a slight turn in the backward direction. The body is substantial and very muscular. Females can grow to between 10 and 14 pounds (4.5 and 6.4 kg), and the males between 15 and 20 pounds (6.8 and 9.1 kg). Despite the "big-cat look", the Highlander is a human-oriented, friendly and playful cat, and very active and confident. The Highlander displays tabby/lynx point or solid point coloration in various colors. Bi-colored cats are not allowed in the breed standard. Although some cats are polydactyl, it is not part of the standard and it is a disqualification in the show ring.

== History ==
The Highlander breed refinement began in 2004, to distinguish the breed better from its foundation stock, and to seek competition status in major breed registries. The name Highlander was adopted in late 2005. Starting May 1, 2008, the breed was recognized by The International Cat Association (TICA) for competition in the Preliminary New Breed class, and in 2016 was moved up to Advanced New Breed. TICA divides Highlanders into two varieties, under the names Highlander Shorthair and simply Highlander for the longer-haired variation. In 2022, the Highlander was accepted as a championship breed in the American Cat Fanciers Association (ACFA).

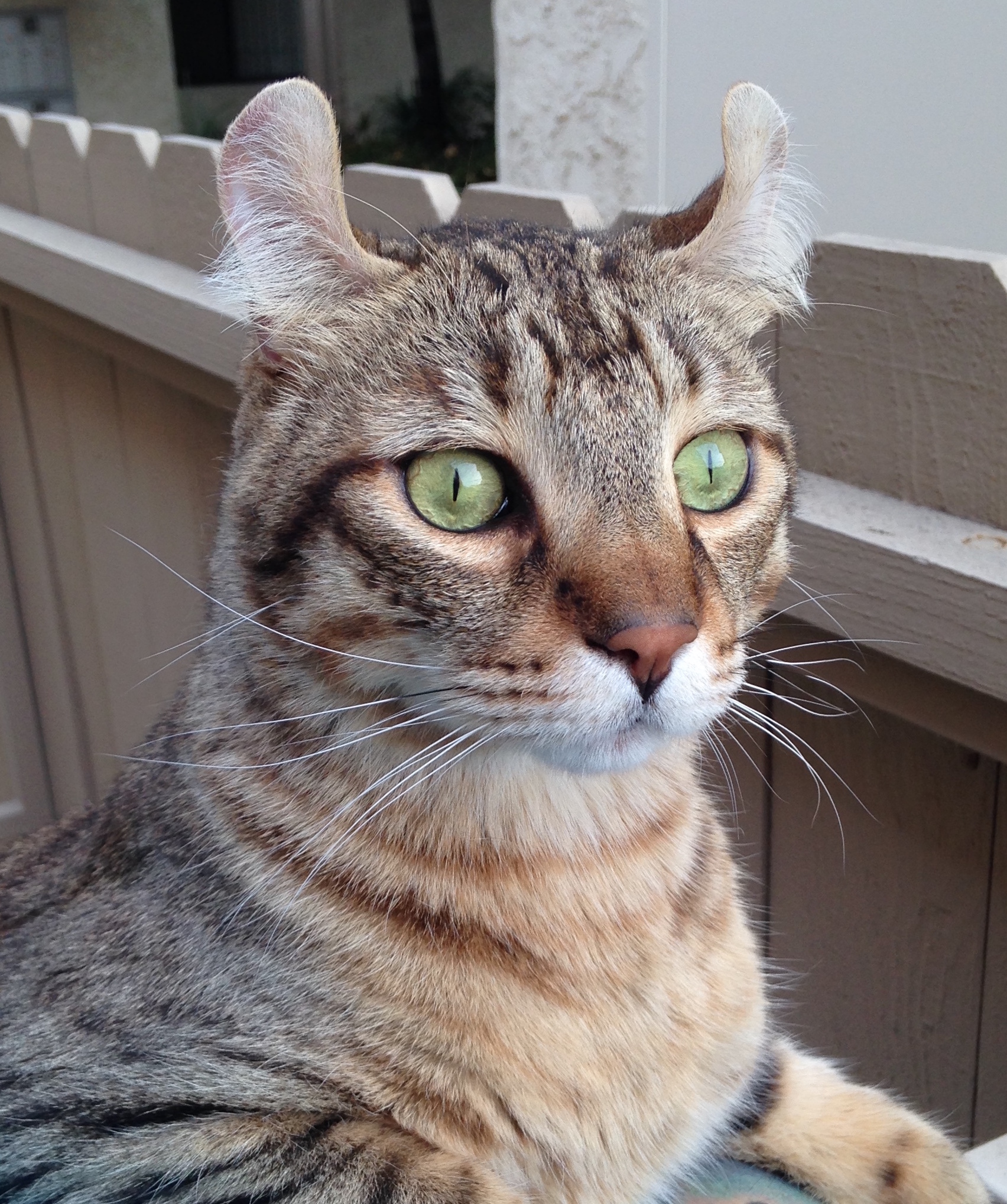
Closeup of Highlander face, with curled ears and distinctive facial features

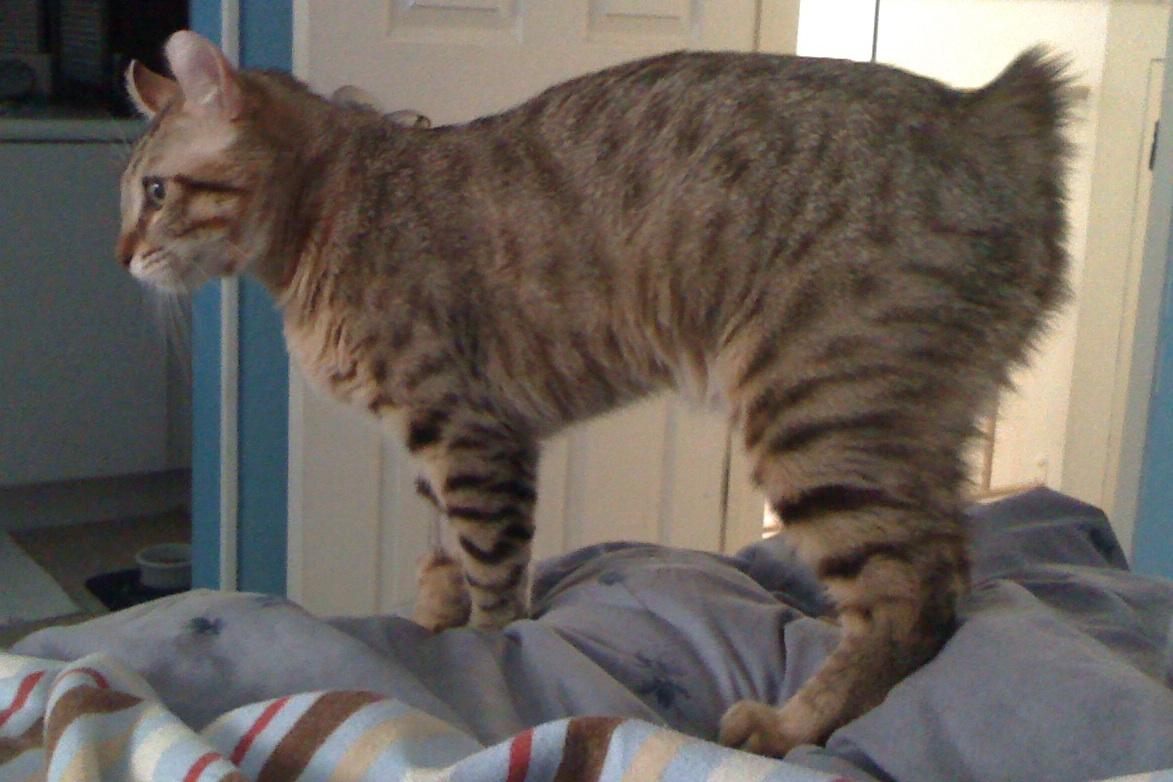
Tabby markings and bobtail

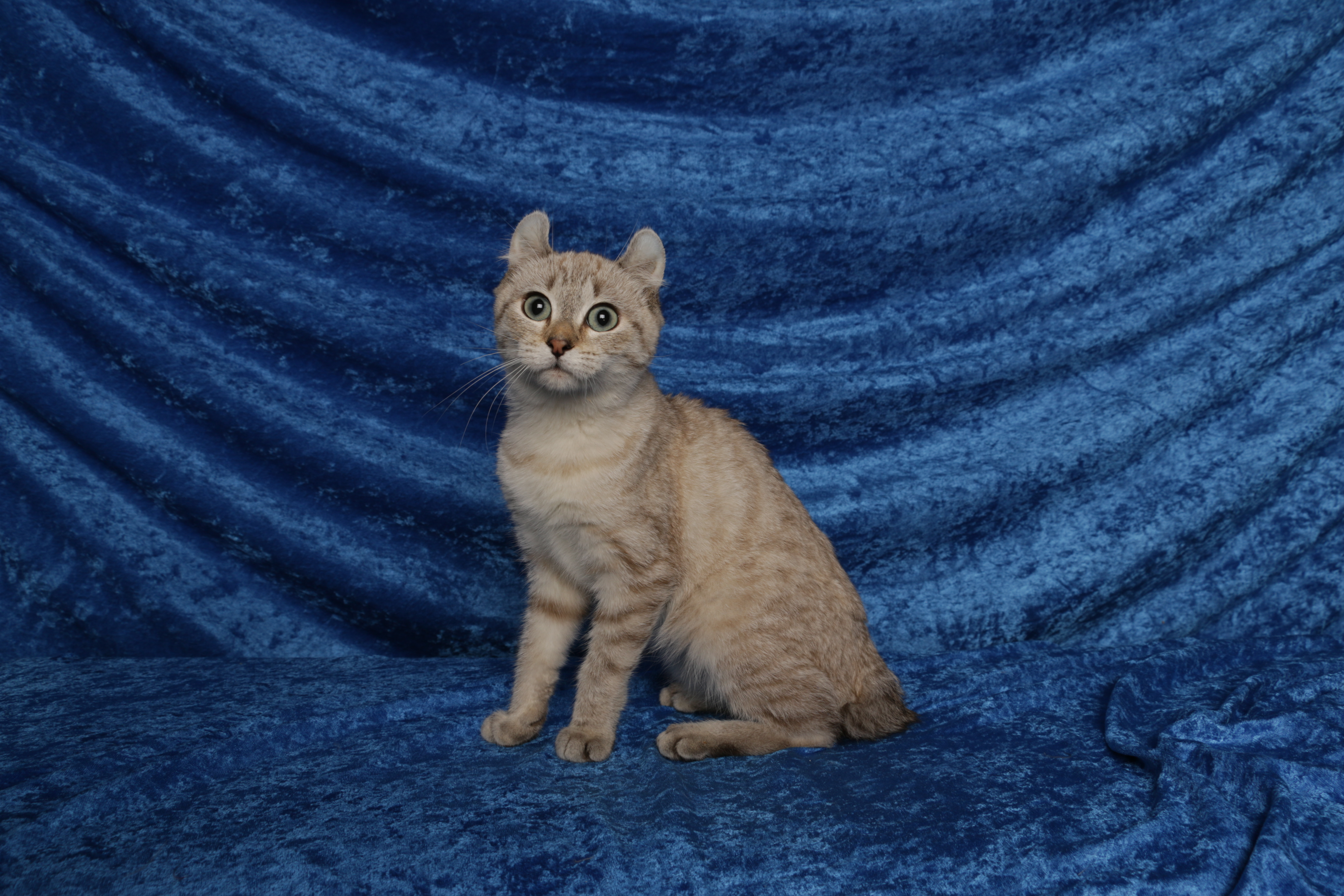
Show champion Highlander, mink spotted tabby

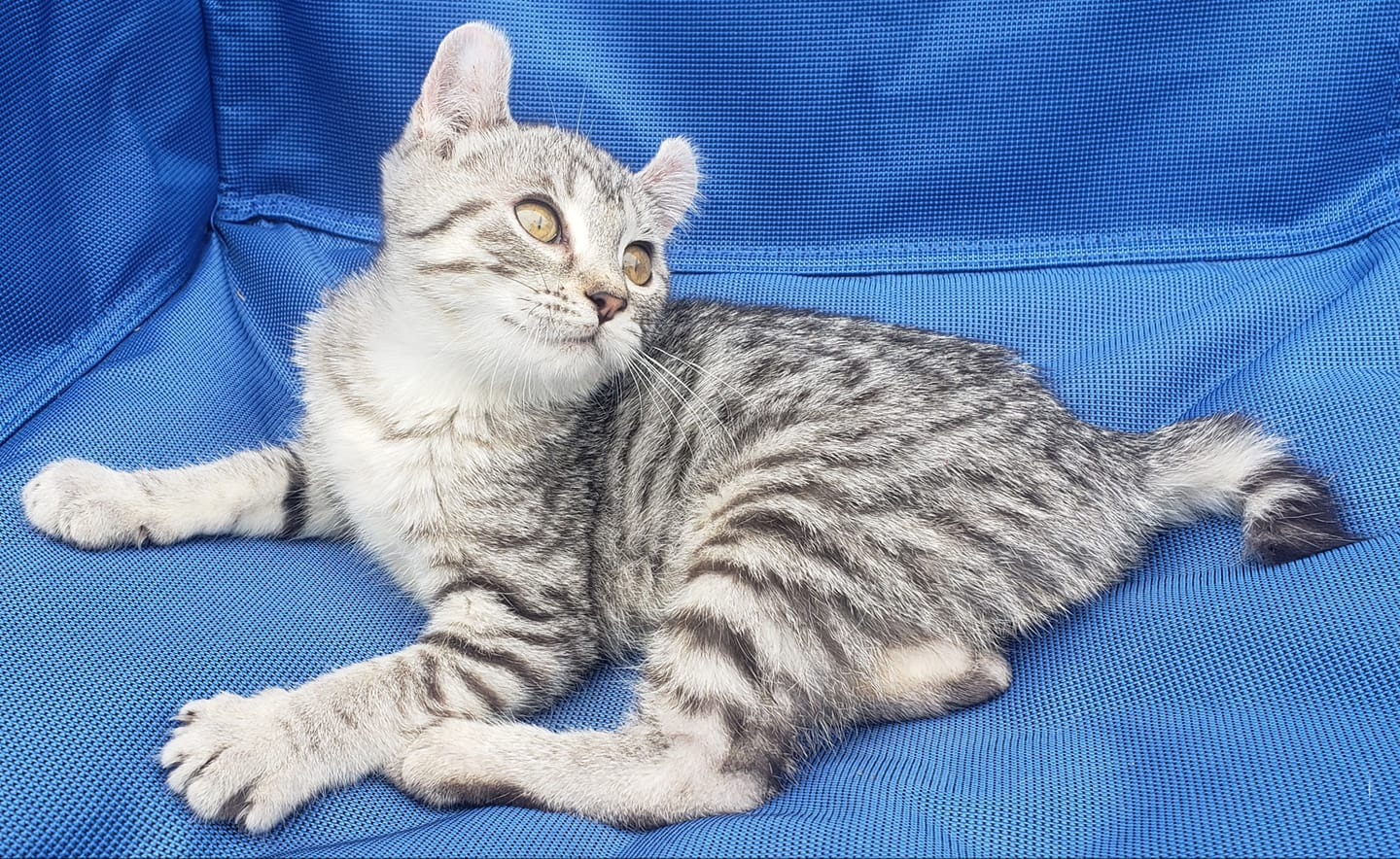
Silver spotted tabby Highlander

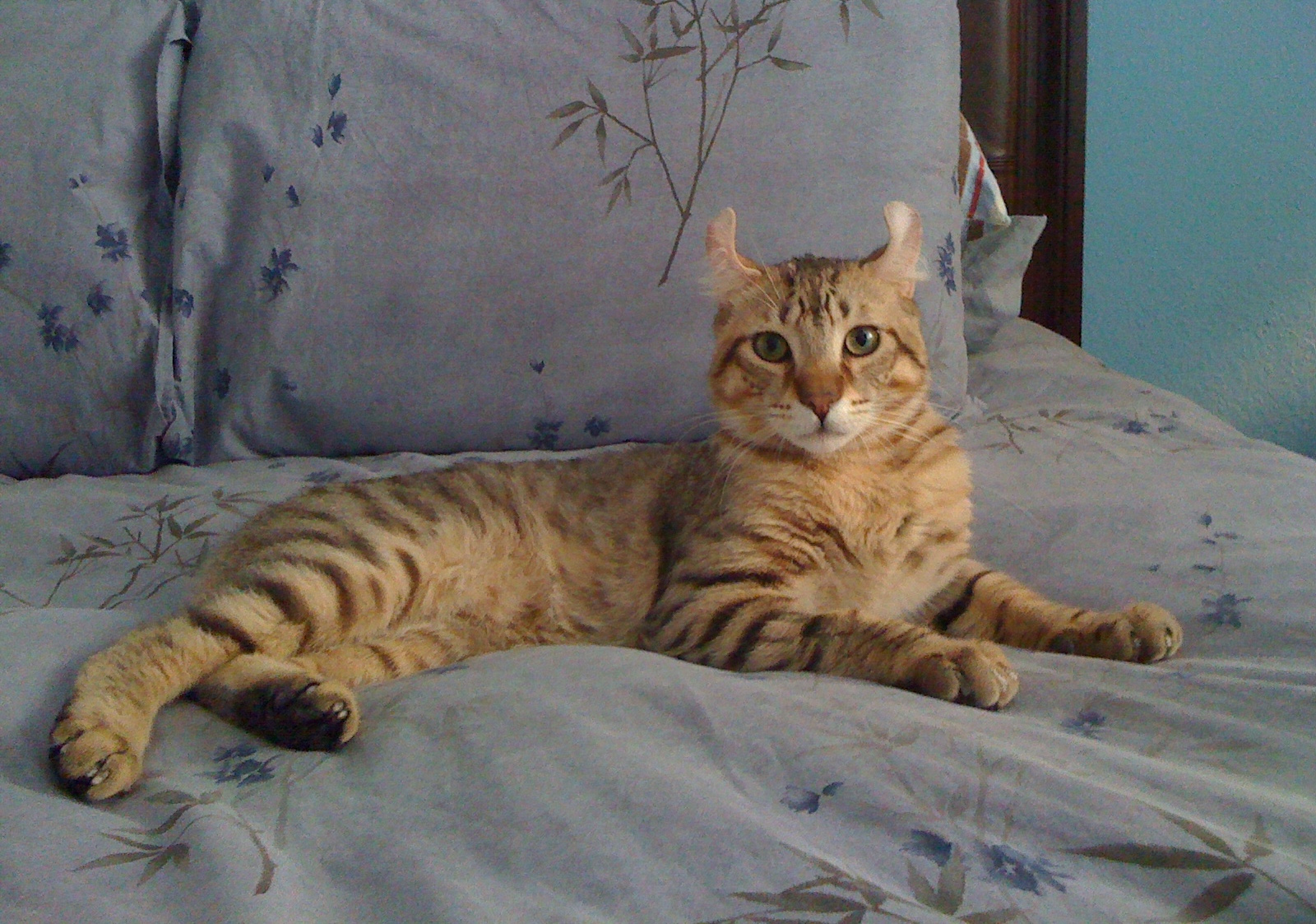
Male Highlander cat

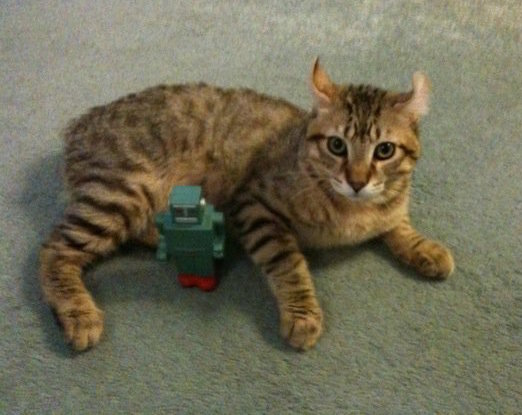
Highlander kitten

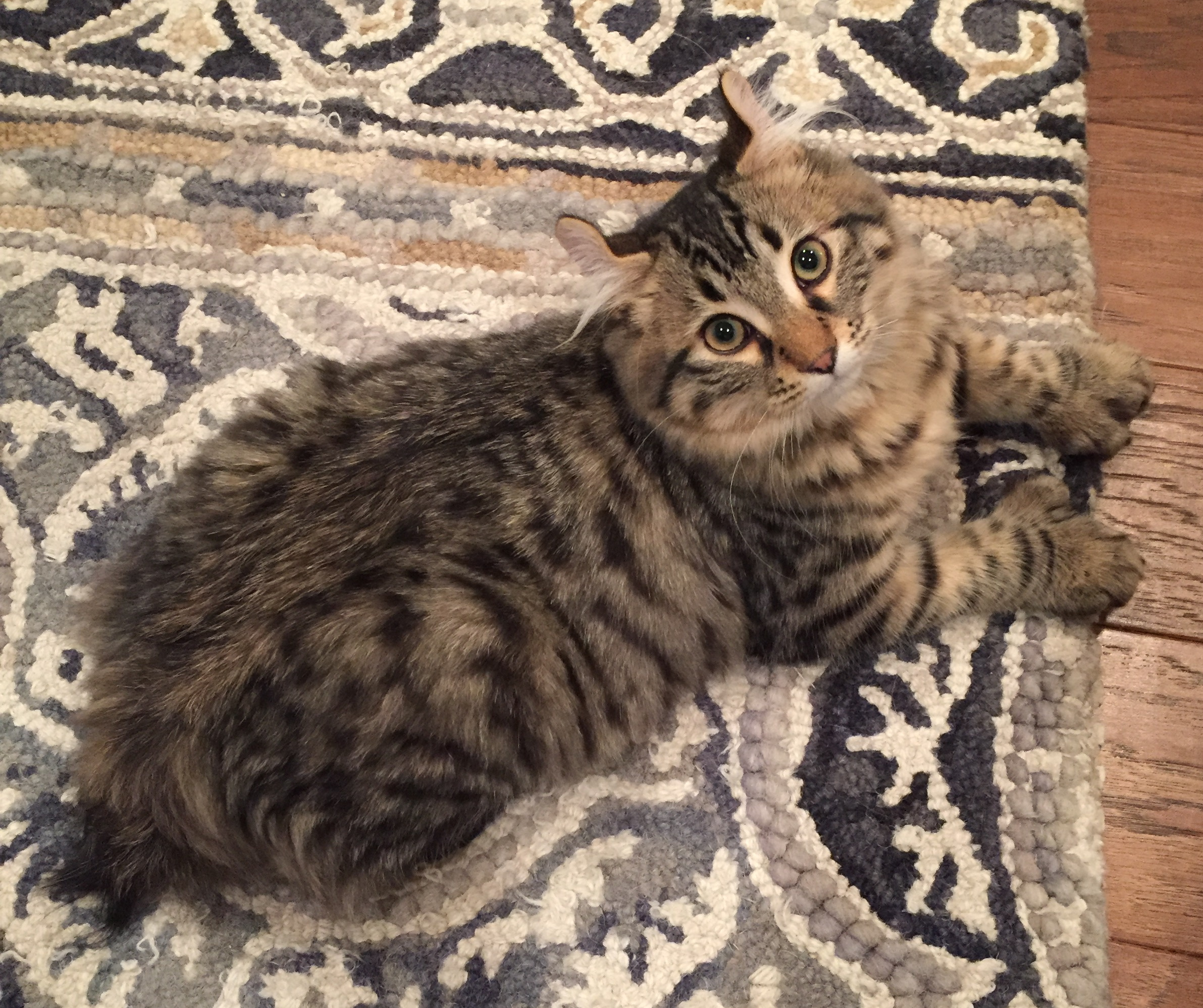
Highlander juvenile, 4 months old, with polydactyl paws
