= Manxman =

Manxman may refer to:

- An inhabitant of the Isle of Man

== Geography ==
- Manxman's Lake, a sea loch of Scotland

== Ships ==
- See List of ships named Manxman
- Manxman-class, an alternative name for Abdiel-class minelayer

== The arts ==
- The Manxman (1929 film), a film directed by Alfred Hitchcock
- The Manxman (1916 film), a British silent drama film
- The Manxman (novel), an 1894 book written by Hall Caine

== Vehicles ==
- Excelsior Manxman, a motorcycle designed and built by the Excelsior Motor Company
- Manxman, a motorcycle manufactured by Norton Motorcycle Company
- Peel Manxman, the earlier name of Peel Manxcar, a car made on the Isle of Man in 1955

== See also ==
- Manx (disambiguation), an adjective (and derived noun) describing things or people related to the Isle of Man
