= Manx =

Manx (/mæŋks/; formerly sometimes spelled Manks) is an adjective (and derived noun) describing things or people related to the Isle of Man:

- Manx people
  - Manx surnames
- Isle of Man

It may also refer to:

== Languages ==
- Manx language, also known as Manx or Manx Gaelic, the native Goidelic Celtic language of the Indo-European language family of the Isle of Man
- Manx English, the English dialect of the Isle of Man

== Animals and plants ==
- Manx cat, a cat breed with no tail or sometimes a short tail, originating on the Isle of Man
- Manx Loaghtan, a breed of sheep, originating on the Isle of Man
- Manx Rumpy, a breed of chicken, not originating on the Isle of Man
- Manx robber fly (Machimus cowini), an insect
- Manx shearwater (Puffinus puffinus), a seabird
- Isle of Man cabbage (Coincya monensis monensis), sometimes called the Manx cabbage
- Cabbage tree (New Zealand) (Cordyline australis), sometimes called the Manx palm
- Extinct animals from the Isle of Man

== Other uses ==
- Manx Airlines, two defunct, Isle of Man-based airlines
- Manx comet, a tailless comet
- Manx Norton, a racing motorcycle
- Manx pound, the currency of the Isle of Man
- Manx Radio, the national radio station of the Isle of Man
- Manx Spirit, a clear whisky from the Isle of Man
- Meyers Manx, a dune buggy
- Varius Manx, a Polish pop group
- Handley Page Manx, an experimental British aircraft from World War II
- Harry Manx, Manx-born Canadian musician
- Manx Software (named after the cat), developers of the Aztec C compiler
- Manx, the benevolent mayor of Megakat City, a fictional character in Swat Kats

== See also ==
- Manxman (disambiguation)
