= American Bobtail =

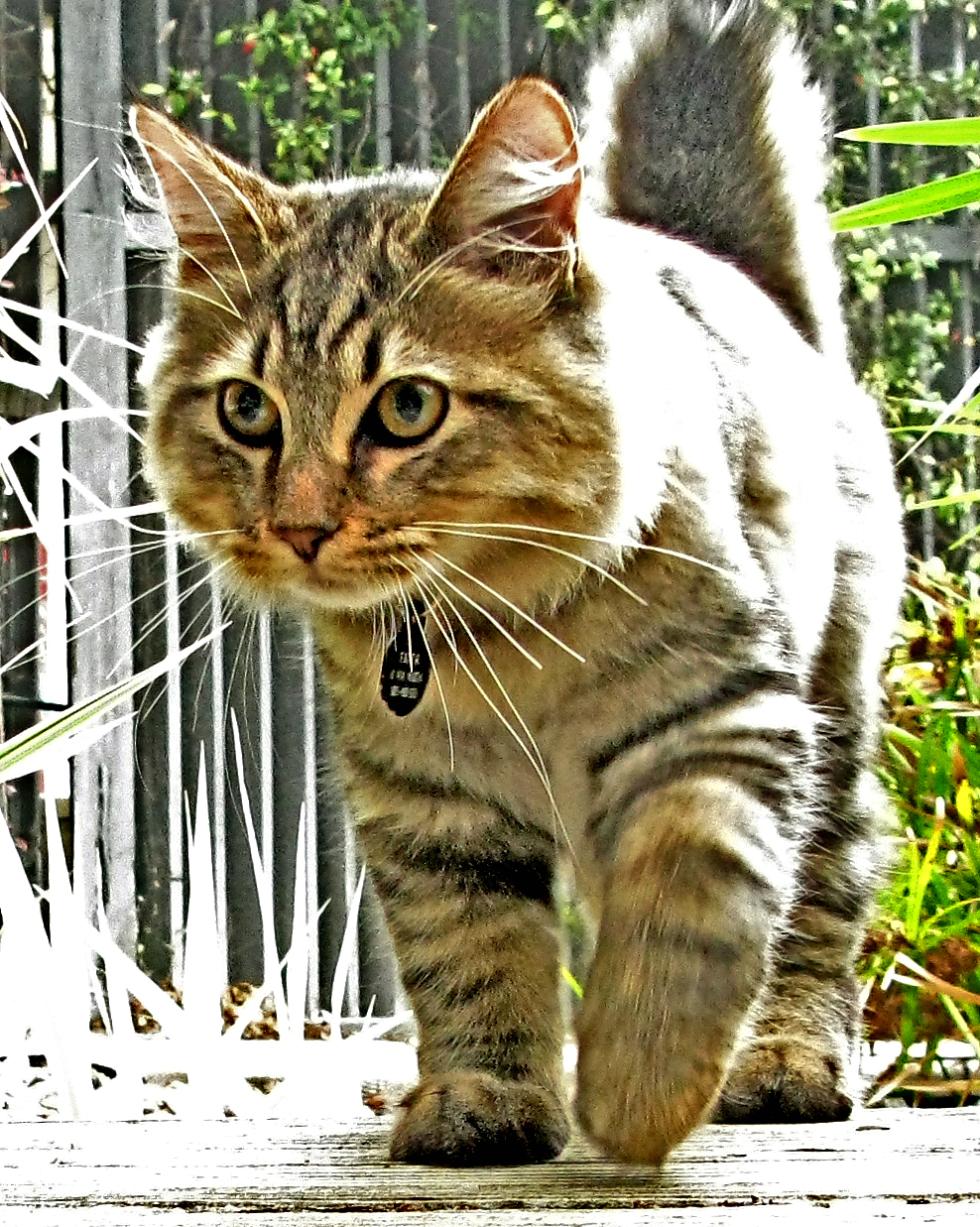
- Long-haired American Bobtail cat.
- Origin: United States

Breed standards
- CFA: standard
- TICA: standard
- WCF: standard
- ACFA/CAA: standards: LH, SH

The American Bobtail is an uncommon breed of domestic cat which was developed in the late 1960s. It is most notable for its stubby "bobbed" tail about one-third to one-half the length of a normal cat's tail. This is the result of a cat body type genetic mutation affecting the tail development, similar to that of a Manx cat. The breed is not related to other short-tailed breeds, such as the Cymric cat, or the Japanese Bobtail or Kurilian Bobtail, despite the similar name and physical type—the breeding programs are entirely unrelated, and the genetic mutation causing the bobbed tail are known to be different, as the mutation causing the American Bobtail's short tail is dominant; comparatively, the Japanese Bobtail, for example, has a tail mutation that is recessive.

American Bobtails are a very sturdy breed, with both short- and long-haired coats. Their coat is shaggy rather than dense or fluffy. They can have any color of eyes and coat, with a strong emphasis on the "wild" tabby appearance in show animals.

== History ==
Urban legend says that Bobtails are the result of a cross breeding between a domestic tabby cat and a wild bobcat. The unusual tail is actually the result of a random spontaneous genetic mutation within the domestic cat population, and may be related to the Manx gene, which is also dominant. Yodie, a short-tailed brown tabby male, was mated with a seal-point Siamese female to create the American Bobtail's original bloodline. Most of the early bloodlines have died out.

This cat's original appearance genetics were modified in the breed to form a new and improved strain which comes in essentially all colors and coat types. The breed was first recognized by The International Cat Association (TICA, US-based), in 1989. The breed has been accepted for championship competition by TICA, the Cat Fanciers' Association (CFA, also US-based) and the American Cat Fanciers Association (ACFA). The breed is technically also sanctioned in the Cat Aficionado Association (CAA) of China, by virtue of the CAA having adopted all of ACFA's breed standards; it is unknown if any specimens are actually in China. The breed is recognized by the World Cat Federation as both American Bobtail Longhair and American Bobtail Shorthair.

== Appearance ==
American Bobtails require two to three years to develop, slower than many domestic cat breeds.

While the typically "bobcat-" or "ocelot"-like spotted coat patterning is the most basal coloration seen on the breed, many other colors and patterns exist (both in long and shorthair varieties), including black, blue, brindle, brown, calico, chocolate, cinnamon, fawn, lilac, pied, red-and-cream, peach or orange tabby or tortoiseshell, all with or without varying amounts of all-white fur on the chest, neck, legs or underside.

The American Bobtail is hearty, short-tailed cat. Its body is moderately long, with substantial boning, and stocky. The stance is noticeably rectangular. The torso is full and broad. The hips are substantial, almost as wide as chest, and hind legs longer than fore legs with large round feet which may have toe tufts. The head is a broad wedge without flat planes, size proportionate to body. There is a concave curve from nose to brow, or rise to prominent brow, a broad unpinched muzzle, prominent whisker pads, a gently sloped wide nose and full, strong jaws. The ears are medium-sized, wide-based, and equally mounted on top and the side of head with rounded tips. The eyes are almost almond shape, with size proportionate to head. The aperture is angled to base of ear, and with medium wide spacing and deep sockets. Eye color varies with coat color. The end of the tail is visible above the back, but not beyond the hock while the animal is in repose. The tail is straight or curved, slightly knotted or may have bumps.

== Behavior ==
American Bobtails are playful, social and some may be quite energetic, especially as kittens. They are considered to be highly adaptable to new environments, making them suitable companions for travelers. According to some sources, the American Bobtail is among the most "dog-like" of any cat breed, boldly greeting visitors to the home and never shying away from a potential opportunity to play, hunt or socialize. They have also been called miniature "ocelots", at least in terms of their climbing abilities, and enjoy exploring, jumping, and stalking birds and small animals. It readily comes to humans and other cats and animals for affection, including dogs.
