= List of ships named Manxman =

Several ships have been named Manxman after an inhabitant of the Isle of Man.

- SS Manxman (1870), a passenger steamer of Barrow Steam Navigation Company, built as Antrim
- SS Manxman (1888), a livestock carrier, built as White Star Line's Cufic
- TSS Manxman (1904), Midland Railway, and later Isle of Man Steam Packet, passenger ferry; requisitioned as HMS Manxman 1916-1919
- TSS Manxman (1955), Isle of Man Steam Packet passenger ferry
- MV Manxman, Isle of Man Steam Packet ro-pax ferry, launched in 2022
- HMS Manxman, two ships of the Royal Navy
  - HMS Manxman, an Abdiel-class minelayer, launched in 1940
