= Kurilian Bobtail =

Breed of cat

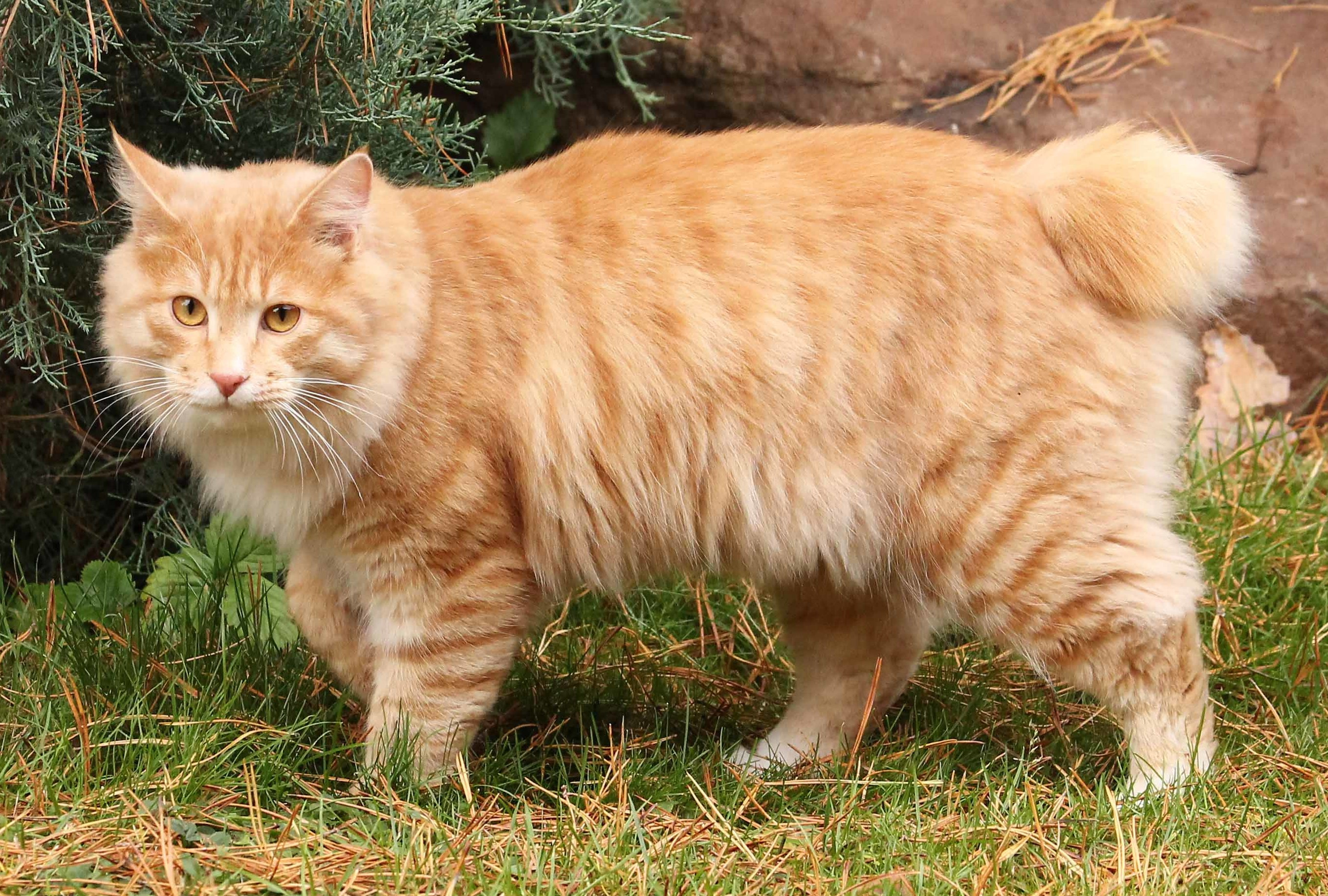
- A semi-long-haired red tabby
- Other names: Kuril Islands Bobtail; Kurilean Bobtail; Kuril Bobtail; Curilsk Bobtail
- Origin: Russia

Breed standards
- FIFe: standard
- TICA: standard
- WCF: standards: Shorthair, Longhair

Notes
- Some registries divide Kurilians into separate shorthair and longhair breeds.

Traits
- Weight: Male: 5–7 kg (11–15 lb); Female: 4–5 kg (8–11 lb)
- Coat: Double layered
- Color: All, but colourpoint
- Litter size: 2 to 3
- Lifespan: 15-20 years
- Fur type: Short to semi-longhair
- Bobtail: 5–13 cm (2–5 in)

The Kurilian Bobtail is a cat breed (or breed group, depending on registry) originating from the Kuril Islands, as well as Sakhalin Island and the Kamchatka peninsula of Russia. Short- or long-haired, it has a semi-cobby body type and a distinct short, fluffy tail. The back is slightly arched with hind legs longer than the front, similar to those of the Manx. The breed is also called the Kuril Islands Bobtail, Kuril Bobtail (both often misspelt "Kurile") and Curilsk Bobtail, and may be referred to without "Bobtail". It is sometimes also spelt Kurilean.

The original short-haired variant is a natural breed, known on the islands for over 200 years. As selectively bred pets, they have been popular in USSR and to some extent other parts of Europe, especially for their rodent-hunting abilities, since the middle of the 20th century, but remained rare in North America as of 2011.

== History ==
This new breed is not well known outside of its native territories. Though it is a native to Japan with a long history on a chain of islands, known as the Kurils, that runs from the easternmost point of Russia to the tip of Japan's Hokkaido Island. Also known as the Kuril Bobtail or the Curilsk Bobtail, because the Kuril Islands are Russian-owned, this breed is being developed and promoted as a Russian aboriginal breed that is separate and distinct from the Japanese Bobtail.

There are around several versions of the origin of the breed. Genetic studies may eventually demonstrate the breed's true origin and connection to other cat breeds.

The main suggested origin story is that the breed is a result of the crossbreeding between the landraces of the Japanese Bobtail cats with Siberian cats brought by sailors to the Kuril Islands.

While possibly closely related to the Japanese Bobtail – both share the same kind of kinked, short tail, but the Japanese is leaner, more angular and less cobby – the Kurilian originated on the opposite side of Eurasia. Hence, it is suggested to rather be related to the similarly named Karelian Bobtail of western Russia and Finland, instead of the Japanese Bobtail.

Just as the Japanese Bobtail and tailless-to-short-tailed Manx arose independently on islands a world apart, the Kurilian's bobbed tail may be an isolated spontaneous mutation that became common on the Kuril and Sakhalin islands because of the limited genetic diversity of island biogeography (an example of the founder effect and, at the sub-specific level, of the species-area curve).

== Breed recognition ==
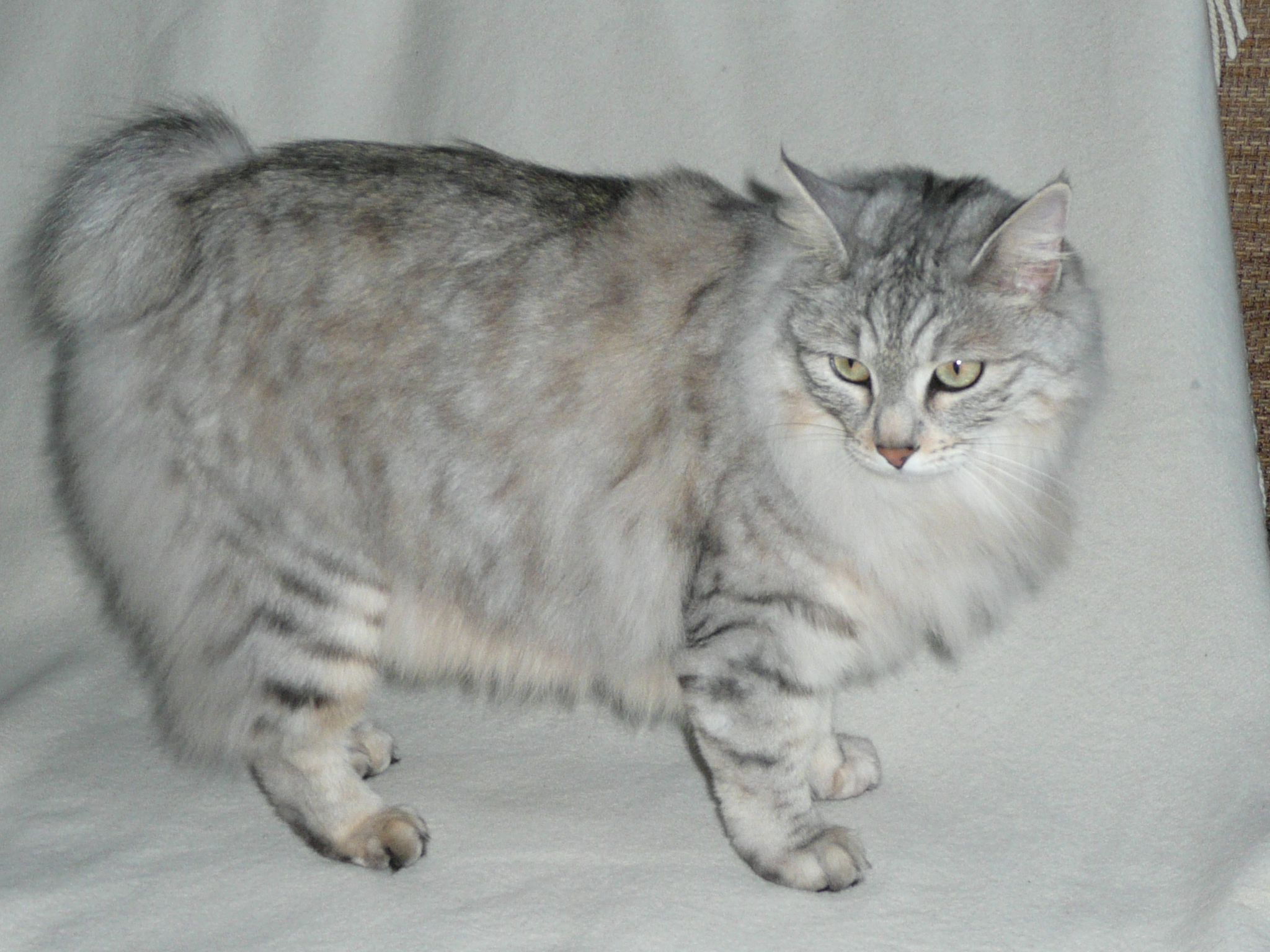
Black silver tabby

Kurilians are recognised as a breed group of a pair related short- and [semi-]long-haired breeds by The International Cat Association (TICA), which considers them "Advanced New Breeds" ineligible for championship status, as of 2011, and by the Fédération Internationale Féline (FIFe). The World Cat Federation (WCF) recognised them in 1994, as a single breed.

== Characteristics ==
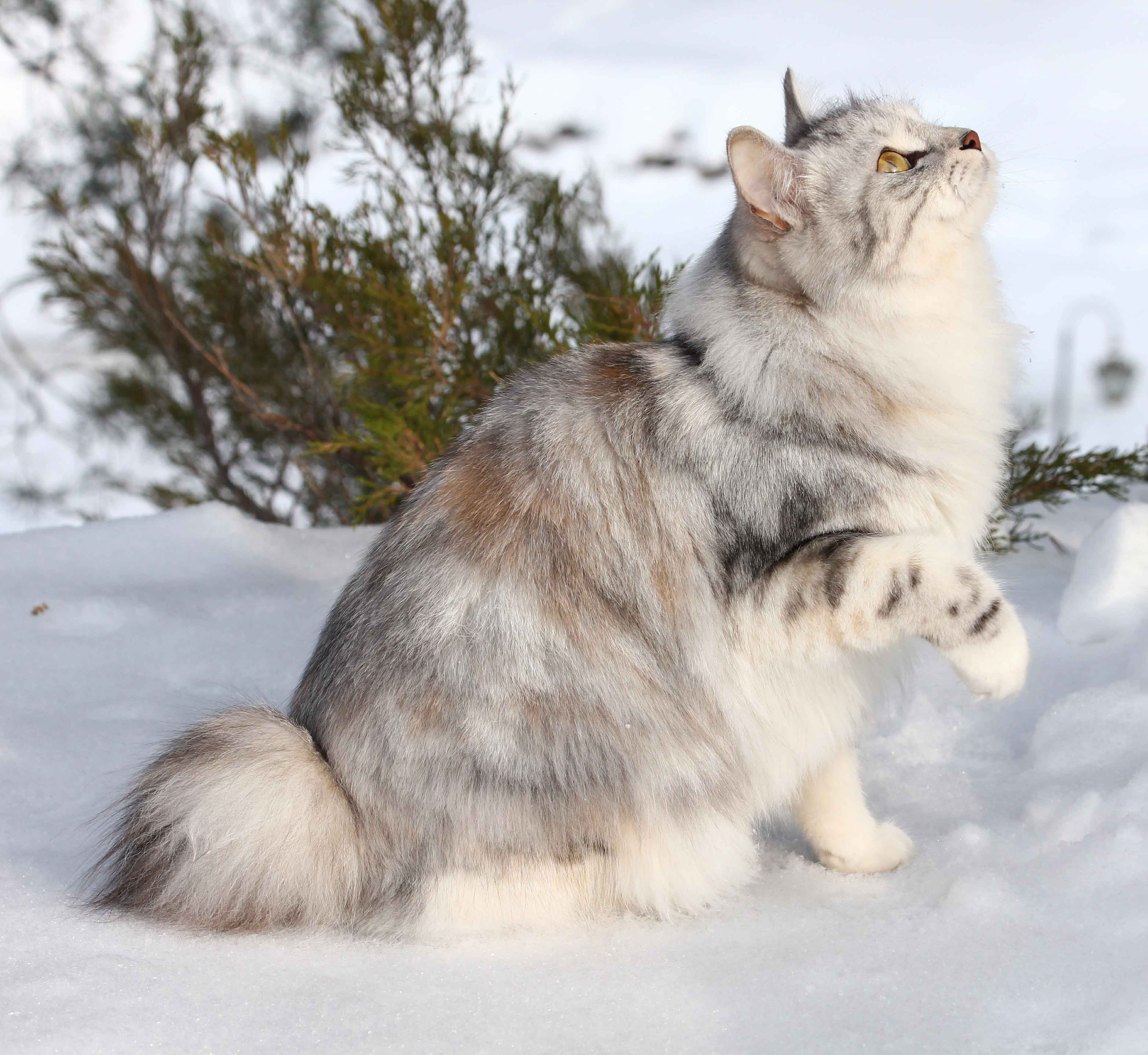
Black tortoiseshell silver blotched tabby female

=== Appearance ===
The variety is mostly known for its distinctive "pom-pom" kinked, short tail. Short- or longhaired, it has a distinct short, fluffy tail ranging from 2 to 10 vertebrae. The back is slightly arched, with hind legs longer than the front. It has a medium to large, substantial, muscular build and rounded-rectangular, wide face. Eye colours conform to the colour of the coat. The colours yellow, green, and yellow-green are preferred. There are semi-longhair and shorthair Kurilians. All colours except colourpoint are allowed.

Part of the reason for its rarity is that there are around two or three kittens in a litter. The lifespan of a Kurilian Bobtail ranges from 15 to 20 years, owing to their breed's being developed in the wild.

=== Behaviour ===
In the wild, this cat is a fisher and hunter, which may explain why the Kurilian plays in water. The Kurilian's wild look is not reflected in the temperament of the breed, as it is known for its clever and gentle nature.
