= Cat Aficionado Association =

Chinese pedigreed cat registry

- Formation: 2001; 25 years ago
- Region served: China
- Official language: Chinese

The Cat Aficionado Association (CAA) is China's largest registry of pedigreed cats and is recognized internationally in conjunction with American Cat Fanciers Association (ACFA) as the premiere pedigreed cat registering association in Asia. Headquartered in Beijing, China, CAA was established on March 3, 2001.

To enter the international arena, CAA established a partnership with ACFA in 2002. CAA abides by ACFA standards, and invites ACFA judges to preside over its official competitive events.

== Purpose ==
CAA's official goal is to publicize and promote pedigreed breeds of cats and to propagate the well-being of all non-pedigree cats, domestic, stray, feral or wild. CAA also promotes one of China's most popular native breeds, the Dragon Li (Li Hua Mau). The CAA logo design depicts a stylized Dragon Li.

== Activities ==
CAA is evolving as an organization, with various programs such as cat rescue, and a trap–neuter–return (TNR) effort for thousands of documented feral and abandoned felines throughout Asia. CAA also trains and assists catteries, and purebred feline owners in registering pedigrees.

Like most such organizations, it also organizes competitive cat shows. CAA's third show (January 1–3, 2004, in Beijing) was briefly documented, in English, by a visiting Canadian ACFA member in 2004 on a website, including photographs of two CAA breeds, the Chinese White and the Dragon Li; ACFA's Dolores Kennedy and Barb Belanger were guest all-breed judges at the event.
