= Japanese Bobtail =

Breed of cat

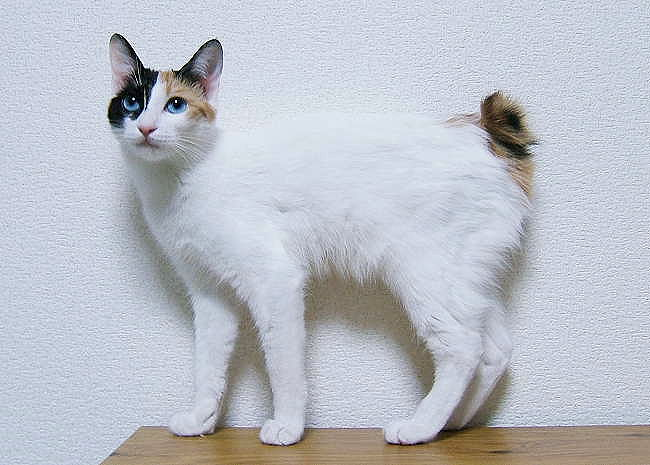
- Female Japanese Bobtail
- Origin: Japan

Breed standards
- CFA: standard
- FIFe: standard
- TICA: standard
- CCA-AFC: standard

The Japanese Bobtail (Japanese: ジャパニーズ・ボブテイル, Hepburn: Japanīzu Bobuteiru) is a breed of domestic cat with an unusual bobtail more closely resembling the tail of a rabbit than that of other cats. The breed was first developed in Japan, and registered officially in the 1960s. The breed has been known in Japan for centuries, and it frequently appears in traditional folklore and art. Japanese Bobtails are believed to be derived from domestic and feral populations of kinked-tailed cats widespread throughout Southeast Asia and southern China.

As in most other breeds, Japanese Bobtails may have almost any color (or colors, arranged in any number of patterns). Predominantly-white calicoes are especially favored by the Japanese and by cat fanciers, and strongly represented in folklore, though other colorations are also accepted by breed standards.

== History ==
Feral and domestic cats with shortened and kinked tails were first documented in Southeast Asia and southern China long before the development of modern breeds. The kinked tail is highly variable and is a dominant trait. They ranged in appearance from being just slightly shortened (around 25 cm (9.8 in) long), to being seemingly abruptly cut off in the middle (around 10 to 20 cm (3.9 to 7.9 in) long), to being bobtails (less than 10 cm (3.9 in) long). These cats were called "qilin tail" in southern China (after the mythical creature) and were traditional symbols of fortune and wealth. Charles Darwin described the widespread occurrence of this trait in The Variation of Animals and Plants Under Domestication (1868): "Throughout an immense area, namely the Malayan archipelago, Siam, Pegu and Burmah, all the cats have truncated tails about half the proper length, often with a sort of knot at the end."

A 2016 study has identified that the kinked tails in these cats are the result of a missense mutation of the HES7 gene. It is the same cause of the mutation in Japanese Bobtails, making it likely that the ancestral founder of the Japanese bobtail is originally from Southeast Asia or China and that the bobtail trait already existed prior to their introduction to Japan.

It is unknown when cats were first introduced to Japan, but they likely arrived through multiple introductions from trade with the rest of Asia. It is believed that they first arrived along with Buddhist monks in the 6th century, who kept cats as a means of preventing rats from damaging scrolls made from Xuan paper. They were initially regarded as luxury goods. The first documented mention of a cat in Japan is from the journal entry of the young Emperor Uda in March 11, 889. He described it as a gift which arrived by boat to his father, the late Emperor Kōkō.

In 1602, Japanese authorities decreed that all cats should be set free to help deal with rodents threatening the nation's silkworm population and associated industry. At that time, buying or selling cats was illegal, and from then on, bobtailed cats lived on farms and in the streets. Japanese Bobtails thus became the "street/farm cats" of Japan.

Around 1701, in Kaempfer's Japan, the first book written by a Westerner about the flora, fauna, and landscape of Japan, German doctor Engelbert Kaempfer (1651 – 1716) wrote, "there is only one breed of cat that is kept. It has large patches of yellow, black and white fur; its short tail looks like it has been bent and broken. It has no mind to hunt for rats and mice but just wants to be carried and stroked by women."

The wife of a travelling missionary, Margaret Tate Kinnear Ballagh, who moved to Japan in 1861 and settled in Kanagawa, described the cats thus; "Most of the cats here are tailless; large, glossy, fat and lazy and do not get their living by catching rats. In fact, the rats are nearly as large as they are, so pussy knows better than to attack them, so we are left to their mercy, and we find them very merciless. (....) Why the cats are without tails has never been satisfactorily explained. For the same reason, I suppose, that the little black-and-white shaggy poodle has a pug nose, and are often dressed with a bright ribbon around the neck and a pinafore round the body besides."

In 1968, Elizabeth Freret is the first known person to have imported the Japanese Bobtail to the Western Hemisphere from Japan. The short hair Japanese Bobtail was accepted for Championship status in the Cat Fanciers' Association in 1976. Recognition for the long hair variety followed in 1993. As of 2013, there are a number of Japanese Bobtail breeders, most of which are based in North America with a few in Europe and at least one in Japan; yet the breed remains rare.

The Bobtail cats are considered to be a lucky breed and to own one promises prosperity and happiness. The tricoloured, Mi-Ke (pronounced 'mee keh') is known as the luckiest colour for this breed. There is a Japanese statue of a cat with its paw in the air called Maneki Neko (translates to 'beckoning cat') and is an artist interpretation of the bobtail. These statues are common in many Japanese shops as they are thought to attract good people.

== Breed standard ==
The Japanese Bobtail is a recognised breed by all major registering bodies, with the exception of the Governing Council of the Cat Fancy (GCCF), the domestic registry of the United Kingdom.

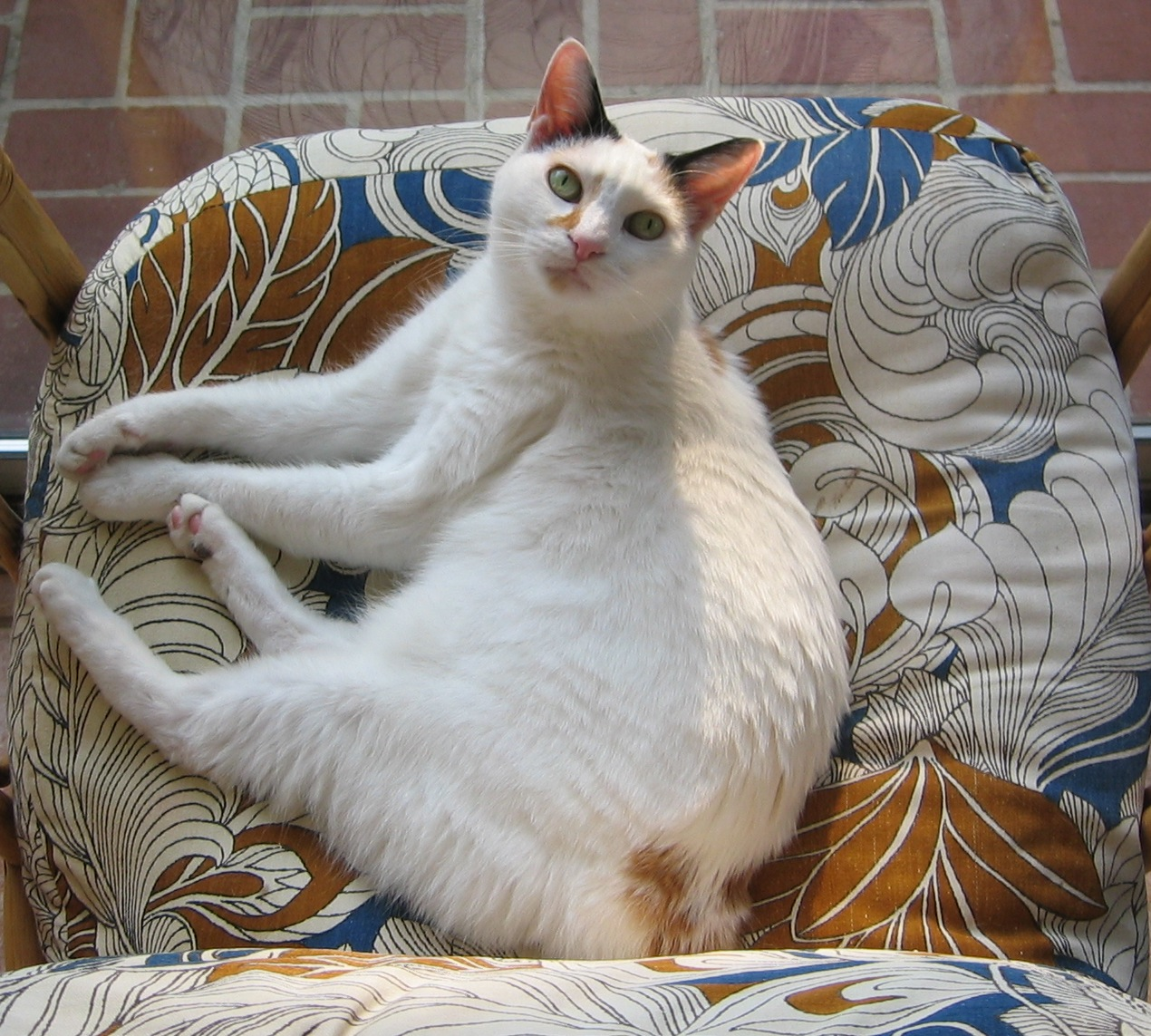
A show-quality shorthair Japanese bobtail displays the characteristics of the breed.

- Head: The head should form an equilateral triangle. (Not including ears)
- Ears: Large, upright, set wide apart but at right angles to the head and looking as if alert.
- Muzzle: Fairly broad and round neither pointed nor blunt.
- Eyes: Large, oval rather than round. They should not bulge out beyond the cheekbone or the forehead.
- Body: Medium in size (usually 2.7 - 4kg, or 6 - 9lbs). males larger than females. Long torso, lean and elegant, showing well developed muscular strength. Balance is also very important.
- Neck: Not too long and not too short, in proportion to the length of the body.
- Legs: Long, slender, and high. The hind legs longer than the forelegs.
- Paws: Oval.
- Toes: five in front and four behind.
- Coat (Shorthair): Medium length, soft and silky.
- Coat (Longhair): Length medium-long to long, texture soft and silky gradually lengthening toward the rump.
- Tail: The tail must be clearly visible and is made up of one or more kinked or curved articulations.

== Breed characteristics ==
=== Personality ===
This breed is good for families.

=== Grooming ===
This breed has a minimal to medium amount of shedding, due to its short fur. Its coat is easy to groom.

=== Health ===
Just like any animal, there can be a number of different health problems that could be related to the genetics. This being said, the Japanese Bobtails are generally healthy cats. The recessive gene paired with the shortened tails is not associated with any spinal or bone abnormalities.

The average lifespan for this breed is 9–15 years.

=== Care ===
They enjoy climbing and can be prone to obesity.

== Breeding and genetics ==
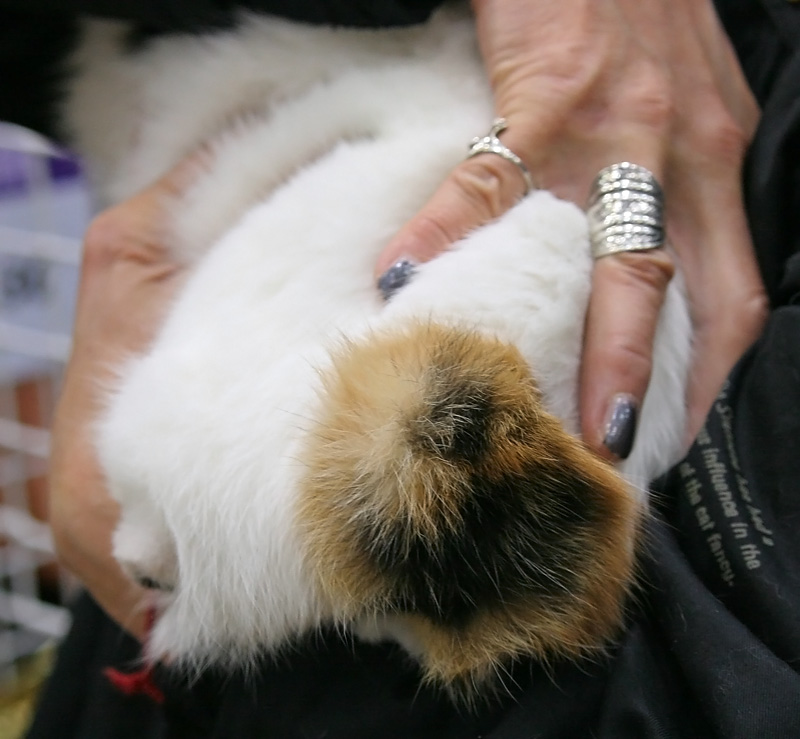
A specimen's bobbed tail

=== Mutation ===
The short tail is a cat body-type mutation caused by the expression of a dominant gene. The tail is both shortened and kinked in Japanese Bobtails. The gene is fixed/always homozygous in the breed, so generally all kittens born to even one Japanese Bobtail parent will have bobtails as well. A bobtailed cat that is heterozygous for the gene may have kittens with or without the trait. Unlike the dominant Manx gene, the Bobtail gene is not associated with skeletal disorders. The Bobtail gene causes a reduced number of tail vertebrae, as well as some fusion of tail vertebrae. This type of tail is not only unique to the breed but also to each individual cat, no two are exactly alike. For it to be considered a true bobtail cat the tail must not exceed three inches from the point of extension to the tailbone.

See also Cat body-type mutation: Tail types

=== Health ===
Recent scientific studies on cat genetics led by researchers has indicated that the Japanese Bobtail breed is one of the most genetically diverse of pedigree breeds. Compared with other breeds, Japanese Bobtails tend to have smaller litters with the kittens being proportionally larger at birth and developing at a faster rate. Kitten mortality rates are reported to be comparatively low.

=== Odd-eyed specimens ===
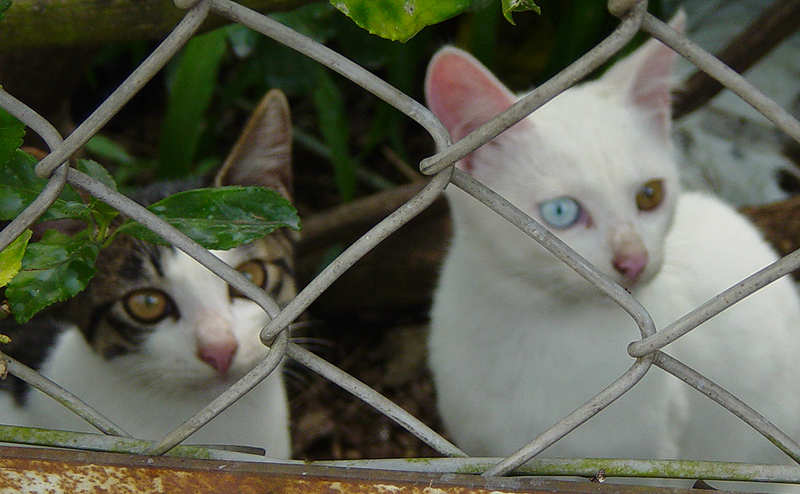
Normal eyed cat and heterochromic or 'odd-eyed' cat

Rarely, a Japanese Bobtail, especially a predominantly white specimen, may have heterochromia, or eyes of different colors. Regardless of breed, cats with this trait are known as odd-eyed cats. In this breed, one iris is blue ("silver" in Japanese breeding terms) while the other is yellow ("gold"). This trait is more common in this breed than in most others, with the notable exception of the Turkish Van.

== Behavior ==
Generally speaking, members of the breed are active, intelligent cats, with a strongly human-oriented nature, are easier to train to perform tricks than most breeds, and are more likely to enjoy learning human-mediated activities like walking on a harness and leash, and playing fetch. They are very attentive, alert felines that notice a lot. Considered an unusually "talkative" breed, they often interact vocally with people. Their soft voices are capable of nearly a whole scale of tones, leading to a folk belief that they can sing.

== Folklore and legend ==
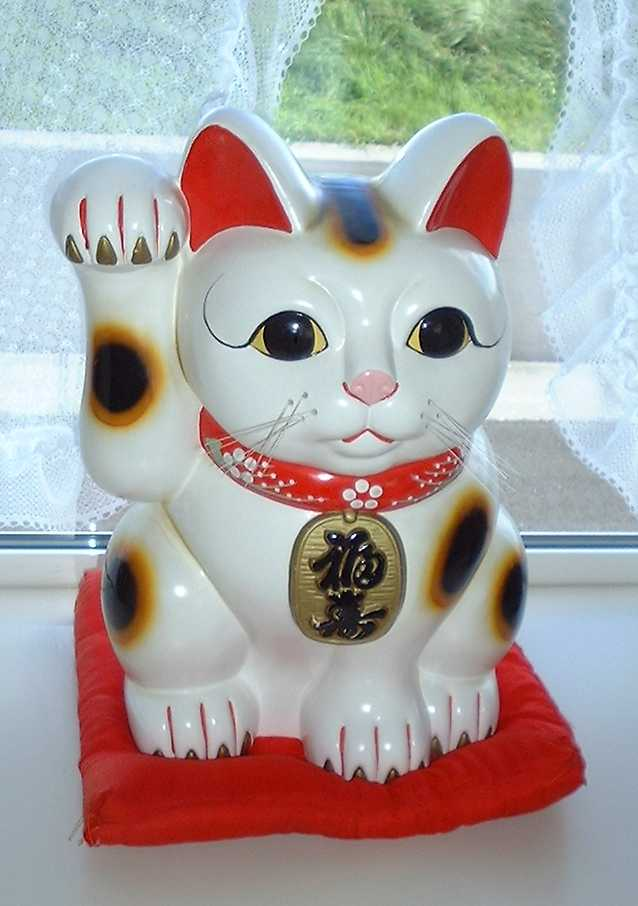
A beckoning cat in typical tricolored coat.

Cats are featured prominently in Japanese folklore. As in many other traditions around the world, cats are frequently objects of fear and mistrust, with various supernatural abilities ascribed to them. But in some Japanese stories, the length of their tails is an important plot point, with the Japanese Bobtail seen as auspicious, while long-tailed cats may be suspected of being nekomata, a type of evil spirit.

The maneki-neko ('beckoning cat' or 'inviting cat'), an image of a Japanese Bobtail seated with one paw raised, is considered a good-luck charm among the Japanese around the world, who often keep a statue of this figure in the front of stores or homes (most often a stylized calico, though gold and black variants are also common). Japanese Bobtails also feature prominently in traditional Japanese painting.

One legend of the origin of the breed's short tail, tells the legend of a sleeping cat whose long tail caught fire; it then ran through town, spreading flames everywhere. With the capital in ashes, the Emperor decreed that all cats should have their tails cut short as a preventative measure.

While legends and superstitions may have favored the short-tailed breed, it seems likely that the Bobtail simply has a longer history in Japan than other recognizable breeds. It is also likely to have carried much prestige, having originated on the continent and arrived via Korea in the Asuka period (6th century CE), along with other prized articles of Chinese culture.

== In popular culture ==
The manga character Hello Kitty resembles a Japanese Bobtail, and is an example of contemporary kawaii ('cute') pop culture. The character Muta from The Cat Returns was based on a stray Japanese Bobtail that would often visit Studio Ghibli. They also tend to appear in other anime produced in Japan.

In W Is for Wasted, by Sue Grafton (part of her alphabet mystery series), private investigator Kinsey Millhone and her landlord Henry Pitts acquire a Japanese bobtail and name him Ed. During a fight with a deranged murder suspect, Ed scratches the killer, thereby saving Kinsey from death by scalpel.

Toro Inoue (井上トロ, Inoue Toro), the mascot of Sony Interactive Entertainment and main character of the Doko Demo Issyo series, is an anthropomorphic white Japanese Bobtail.

Mochi, Hiro Hamada's cat in the Disney film Big Hero 6, is a Japanese Bobtail.

In illustrator Jey Parks's 2017 book Star Trek Cats, Hikaru Sulu is depicted as a Japanese Bobtail.

The titular cat Good Fortune in the Newbery Medal-winning book The Cat Who Went to Heaven is a tricolor Japanese Bobtail.

In the game Unconnected Marketeers of the Touhou Project series, the boss of the game's first stage, Mike Goutokuji (豪徳寺 ミケ, Goutokuji Mike), is based on the traditional appearance of maneki-neko, which are based on calico Japanese Bobtails. The calico colours are seen in her hair, fur and clothing. Her given name Mike (ミケ) is taken from the Japanese term for calico cat, mike-neko (三毛猫, lit. "three-haired cat").

== See also ==
- Kurilian Bobtail
