= Serengeti cat =

Breed of cat

Serengeti
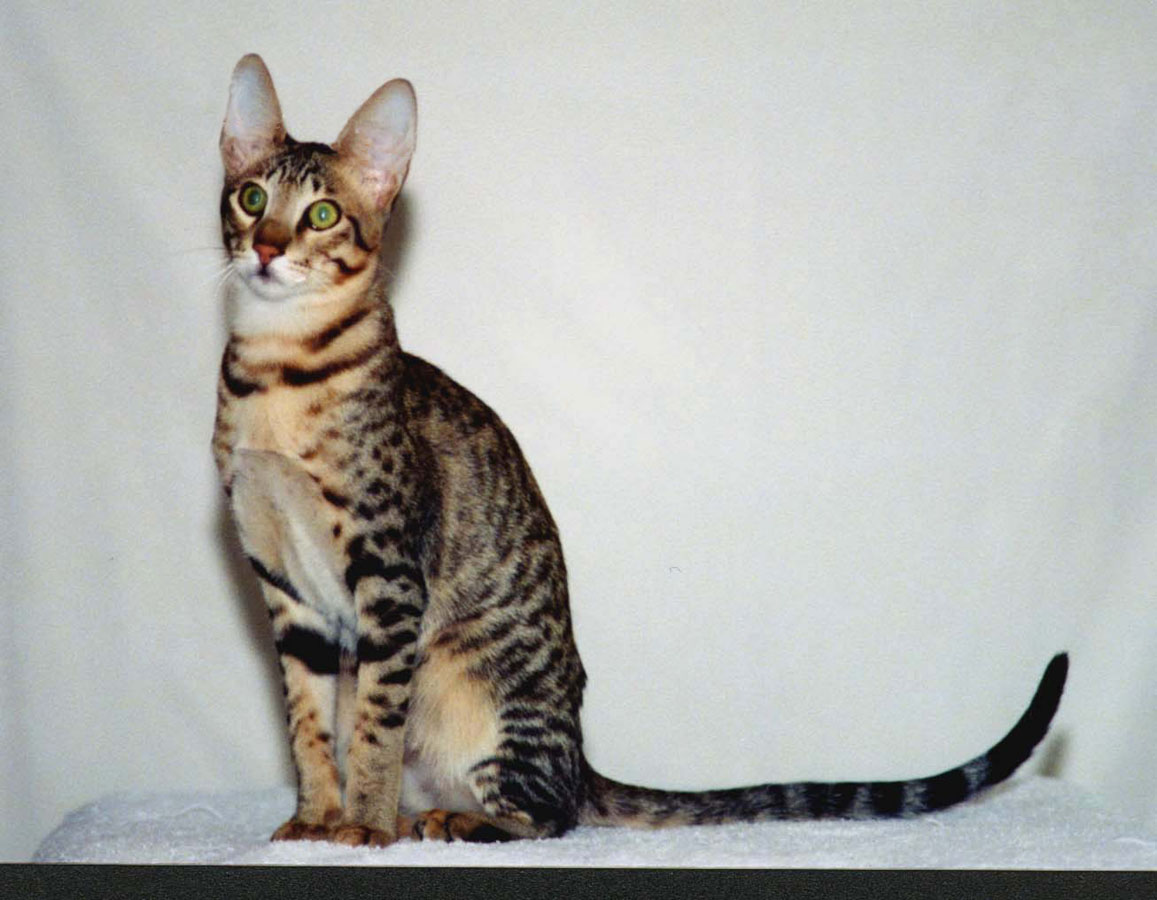
- A male Serengeti
- Origin: United States
- Foundation bloodstock: Oriental Shorthair, Bengal cat

Breed standards
- TICA: standard

The Serengeti is a hybrid breed of domestic cat, first developed by crossing a Bengal (domestic × wild Asian leopard cat hybrid) and an Oriental Shorthair.

== History ==
The breed was created by biologist Karen Sausman of Kingsmark Cattery in California in 1994, the breed is still in the development stages, but the ultimate aim is to produce a cat that looks similar to a serval, without using any recent wild cat blood.

Bengal cats originate from hybridisation of leopard cats and domestic cats. Most Bengal cats used in Serengeti breeding programs are many generations removed from these origins and possess few genetic contributions of the wild forebears except alleles affecting coat colour. From the Bengal × Oriental cross came the first foundation Serengeti. Breeders then worked with the cat to produce a cat that resembles the breed profile set by the cat registries.

== Breed recognition ==
Recognised and registered by The International Cat Association (TICA), no other first generation crosses can be registered as Serengeti.

== Characteristics ==
Serengetis are spotted cats, with long legs and very large, round tipped ears. They have a long neck which blends with the base of the skull without tapering. Males are generally slightly larger and heavier than females and can weigh between 5–7 kg (10–15 lb); females generally weigh between 4–5 kg (8–12 lb).

They come in black (TICA: "ebony", UK: "brown") tabby or solid, and with or without silver or smoke. And spots can be black or dark brown on a tan, light beige or gold background. The silver has black spots on a silver background. Ghost spotting can sometimes be seen on the solid black version.

== Health ==
Serengeti cats are generally a healthy breed, with a few health issues, such as urinary crystals.

== See also ==
- Chausie, a breed of cat hybridised with jungle cat
- Savannah, a breed which integrates the serval's genes
