= Felinology =

Study of cats

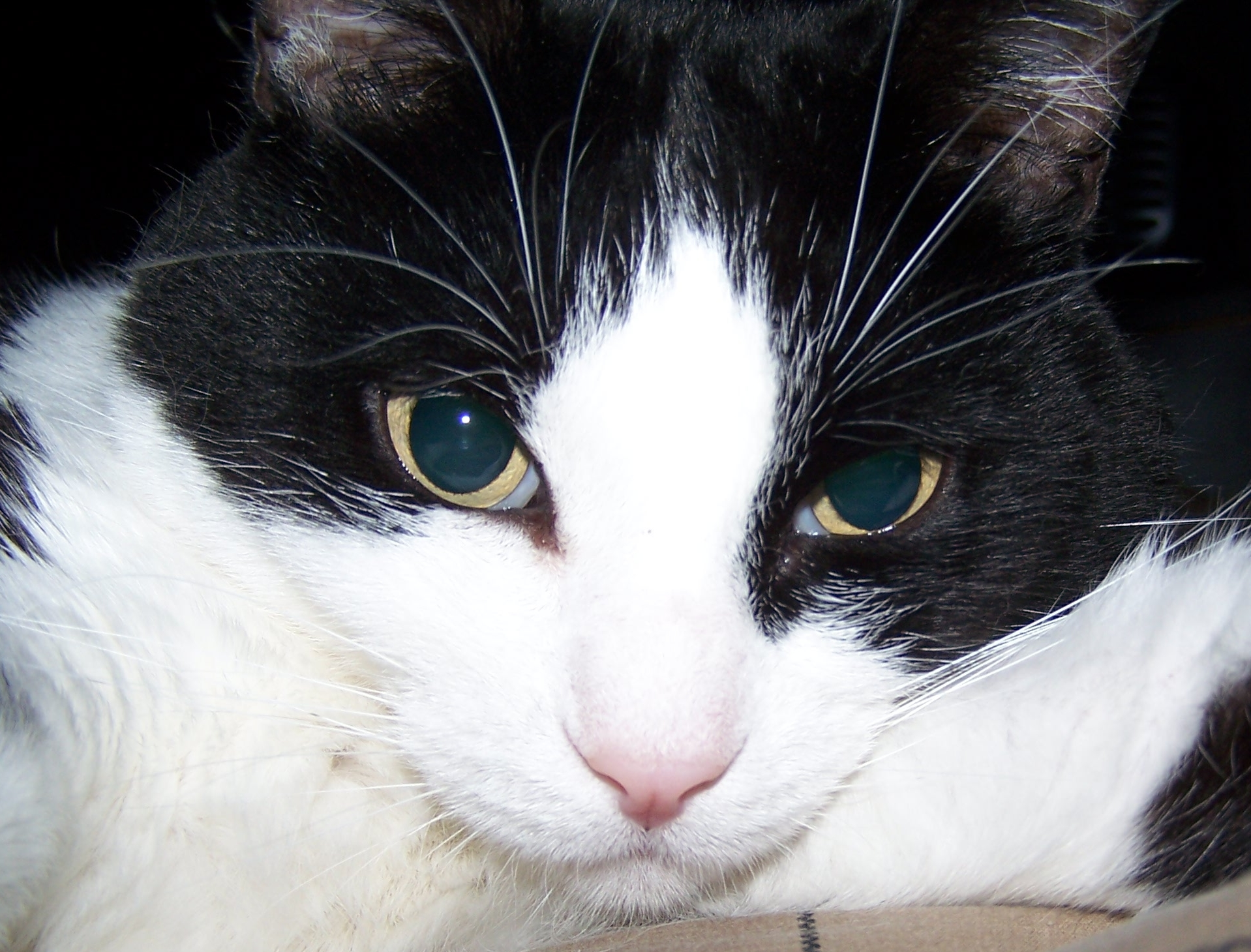
A bicolor cat

Felinology (Note: also occasionally known as felidology) is the study of cats. The term is of Latin-Greek origin and comes from the Latin word felinus (of cats, feline) and the Greek -logos (science). Felinology is concerned with studying the anatomy, genetics, physiology, and breeding of domestic and wild cats.

== Famous Felinologists ==
- Desmond Morris
- John Bradshaw
- Temple Grandin
- Jean Mill
- Leslie Lyons
