= Caracat =

Hybrid breed of cat

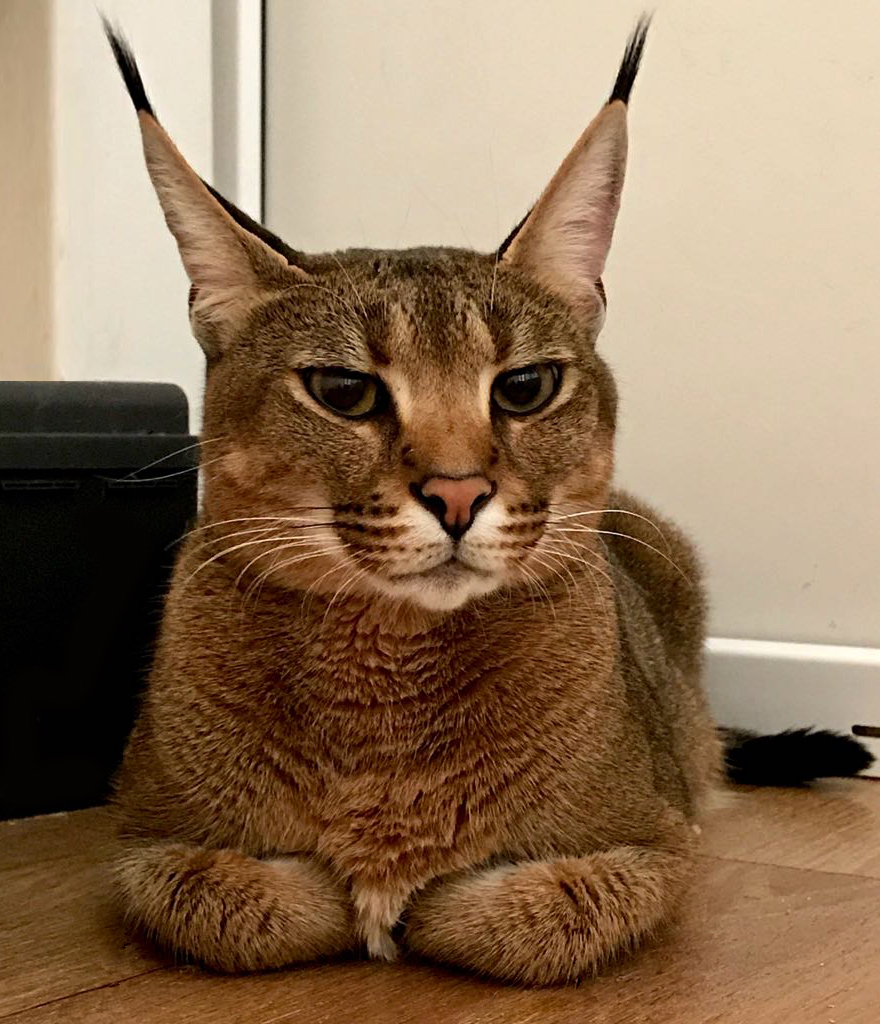

The Caracat is a breed of hybrid cat developed by the hybridisation of a caracal (Caracal caracal) with a domestic cat (Felis catus), most often an Abyssinian.

== History ==
The first recorded caracal-domestic cat hybrid happened by accident in 1998 at the Moscow Zoo, when a domestic cat entered the enclosure of a male caracal and the two mated.

Deliberate breeding programmes followed in subsequent years.

In the early 2000s, the first successful intentional crossing of a domesticated caracal with an Abyssinian cat occurred in the United States. Joy Geisinger paired a male caracal with Abyssinian females, producing the first planned caracat litter.

In 2010, Patrick Rühl with a group of German and Austrian breeders established the "International Foundation for Wild and Hybrid Cats". They attempted to cross caracals with Maine Coon cats, whose gestation period more closely matched that of the caracal. Due to controversy and disagreements among breeders the website of the IFWHC went offline in 2011.

In Russia, the first cattery dedicated to this breed was established by Irina Nazarova, producing her first caracat litters in 2014.

The Ukrainian felinologist Ganna Kuzmina was the first to achieve fertile F5 males.

== Characteristics ==
=== Appearance ===
Caracats are described as large, solidly built cats, with long limbs, expressive eyes, and prominent black-tipped ear tufts. The typical coat is a warm reddish-brown usually with a lighter chest and belly.

With each successive filial generation, traits such as large size and ear tuft prominence diminish, though responsible breeding programmes attempt to preserve identifying features while improving temperament.

=== Behaviour ===
F1 caracats show a strong selective attachment to their primary caretaker, while displaying wariness of unfamiliar people. Early socialization, such as bottle-feeding from a young age, is considered important for achieving even a limited social tolerance. F5 caracats behave more like typical domestic cats.

== Health ==
The caracal's gestation period runs roughly 15 days longer than that of the domestic cat. This mismatch can lead to premature or oversized kittens.

F1 caracats have a shorter, more carnivore-specialized digestive tract poorly suited to commercial dry food. F5 caracats tolerate standard diets much better.

== Legal status ==
Because they carry genes from the wild caracal, the Caracat falls under the same restrictions as other wildcat hybrids such as the Savannah or Chausie.
