= Jean Mill =

Founder of the Bengal cat breed (1926-2018)

- Mill posing with a Bengal cat
- Born: Jean Belle Sones; May 14, 1926; Des Moines, Iowa, United States
- Died: June 6, 2018 (aged 92); California, US
- Education: Pomona College (BA); University of California, Davis (graduate school)
- Occupations: Cat breeder; author
- Years active: 1948–2018
- Father: Clement Sones

Jean Mill (née Sones; May 14, 1926 – June 6, 2018) was an American cat breeder, owner of Millwood cattery. She is best known as the founder of the Bengal cat breed, and also made contributions to the Himalayan and the standardized version of the Egyptian Mau. Mill and her first husband, Robert Sugden, were involved in a precedent-setting case about the United States government's power to monitor short wave radio communications.

== Breeding activities ==
=== Himalayan cat contributions ===
Jean Mill began work on the Himalayan cat in 1948, breeding Persian and Siamese cats together. She said she originated the breed by 1954 and was showing off her prizewinning cats by 1960. In 1956, as a genetics project at the University of California, Davis, with the intention of breeding "Panda Cats", she established what became the longest continuously bred line of Himalayan cats.

=== Foundation of the Bengal breed ===
Although other breeders were involved in developing the Bengal cat breed, most notably Pat Warren, William Engle, and Willard Centerwall, Mill is considered the originator of the breed because she created a domestic Bengal past the F4 generation by crossing the wild Asian leopard cat with a domestic cat, and then backcrossed the offspring through five generations. She then tirelessly promoted the breed.

Mill has said that the creation of the Bengal cat breed arose from her desire to save the Asian Leopard cat, which was under severe pressure from poaching. She named two rationales: if people could purchase a cat that looked like a wild leopard cat, the actual wild mothers would not be killed in the wild for fur; and the cubs would not be taken to be sold to customers. In 1963, while living in Yuma, Arizona, she first crossed a domestic tomcat with a wild Asian leopard cat. This mating is thought to be the first documented case of this particular felid hybrid.

Mill restarted her breeding program in 1970. In 1975 Willard Centerwall gifted her a group of hybrid Bengal cats that had been bred for his use in feline leukemia research in Loma Linda, California. In 1982, Mill obtained a spotted domestic cat from an American shelter. Later in 1982, while traveling in India, Mill was shown an orange spotted domestic cat living in the rhinoceros pen at the New Delhi Zoo. The zookeepers captured this cat for Mill and shipped him to the United States, where she named him Millwood Tory of Delhi and bred both him and the American spotted cat with the Centerwall hybrid cats.

In the 1980s, Mill succeeded in establishing the Bengal breed, overcoming the problem of early-generation hybrid sterility that had stymied others. Mill backcrossed Bengals until she achieved the F5 Bengal with a domestic-cat temperament. Others also began breeding Bengals, and The International Cat Association (TICA) accepted the Bengal cat in 1986 as a new breed, giving them championship status in 1991. Gene Ducote of Gogees Bengals, one of Mill's earliest customers, has said one of her favorite Jean Mill quotations is: "Beauty always wins out".

== Personal life ==
Jean Sones was born in Des Moines, Iowa, where she attended Theodore Roosevelt High School. In 1948, she earned a BA degree in psychology from Pomona College in California; she later took courses in genetics as a graduate student at the University of California, Davis.

In 1947, she married Robert Sugden, a wealthy rancher and cotton farmer, and moved to his ranch in Yuma, Arizona. In 1949, she was queen of the Yuma Jaycees' fourth annual rodeo. They had a daughter. After Robert Sugden died in 1965, she moved into an apartment and put her breeding efforts on hold.

In 1975, she remarried to engineer Robert James Mill, and moved to his one-acre horse property in Covina Hills, California.

=== United States of America v. Robert V. H. Sugden and Jean S. Sugden ===
On October 7, 1953, she and her first husband Robert Sugden were both indicted for conspiracy to violate United States immigration laws. The main government evidence was obtained by listening to the Sugdens' shortwave radio communications. The U.S. Government alleged that the Sugdens used shortwave radio broadcasts to warn their foremen to hide their illegal-alien workers from Mexico. The Federal Communications Commission suspended the Sugdens' radiotelephone operating permit. Robert Sugden alone was indicted for concealing and shielding illegal entrants into the United States from detection. In spring 1954, the case judge determined that the radio evidence had not been obtained legally and dismissed the charges. The US Department of Justice appealed to the United States Court of Appeals for the Ninth Circuit since they had merely monitored the broadcasts, without wiretapping, and in 1955, won its appeal to have the short wave radio evidence admitted in the case against the Sugdens. The appeals court ruled that because the Sugdens were not licensed to operate the short wave radio at the time of the broadcasts, the FCC could make full disclosure to the US Immigration and Naturalization Service.

== Death and legacy ==
Jean Mill died on June 6, 2018, at the age of 92.

Since Mill's establishment of the breed, Bengals have been accepted into all of the major cat registries, including: Cat Fanciers' Association, Fédération Internationale Féline, World Cat Federation, American Cat Fanciers Association, Australian Cat Federation, Governing Council of the Cat Fancy, and New Zealand Cat Fancy. She was inducted into the TICA Hall of Fame in 2016.

Mill also inspired her daughter Judy Sugden to establish a new cat breed, the Toyger.

== Books ==
- Guide to Owning a Bengal Cat. Philadelphia, Pennsylvania: Facts on File / Chelsea House Publishers. 1999 [1997]. ISBN 9780791054598 – via Internet Archive.
- Breeding Better Bengals: Facts, Fallacies and Fascinations. Covina Hills, California: Millwood Cattery. 1999.
