= Chausie =

Breed of cat

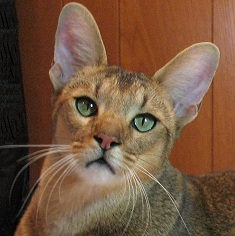
- Chausie with favoured head conformation
- Foundation bloodstock: Abyssinian, Oriental Shorthair, random-bred domestic cats, jungle cat

Breed standards
- TICA: standard

The Chausie (/ˈtʃaʊsi/) is a hybrid breed of cat that was developed by the hybridisation of wild jungle cats (Felis chaus) with domestic cats (Felis catus). The breed has a lean and athletic built, sporting a black-based coat of a ticked or grizzled tabby, or a solid pattern.

In 1995, the Chausie was officially recognised and pedigreed by The International Cat Association (TICA) under the "non-domestic hybrid source breed"-category. Because Chausies are mostly descended from domestic cats, by about the fourth to fifth generation, they are fully fertile and domestic in temperament.

Due to their hybrid origin, multiple countries have legal restrictions on the ownership and breeding of Chausies.

== History ==
The first hybrids of the jungle cat (Felis chaus) and the domestic cat (Felis silvestris catus) may have been born in Egypt several thousand years ago. The jungle cat is native to a vast region spanning Southeast Asia, India, and the Middle East. For the most part, it is an Asian species of wild cat that lives by rivers and lakes. But the species is found in one small area of North Africa: the Nile Delta. It is well known that the ancient Egyptians kept domestic cats as pets. Many domestic cat mummies have been found interred in Egyptian temples. What is not so well known is that one other species of cat was occasionally preserved after death via mummification; that was the jungle cat. F. chaus is not a timid species; they are known for moving into abandoned buildings and living as happily by irrigation canals as by wild rivers, provided that adequate prey and shrubbery for cover are available.

== Breed registration ==
A few people experimented with breeding F. chaus to F. catus in the late 1960s and 1970s. Their intention was to provide a sensible alternative to keeping non-domestic cats as pets. However, the Chausie breed did not truly begin until the 1990s, when a dedicated group of breeders named the breed "Chausie" (after Felis chaus) and developed a planned breeding program and goals. These breeders asked for and received registration status from TICA in 1995. The breed worked its way through the New Breed Class from May 2001 through April 2013, and became TICA's newest Championship breed on 1 May 2013. Chausies are now being bred in both North America and Europe. The breed has begun the new breed recognition process in the World Cat Federation (WCF).

=== Hybrid registry codes ===
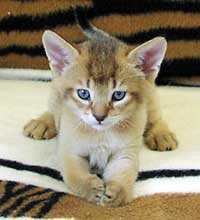
Very young kitten. Eye and coat colour not yet fully developed.

Currently, most authentic Chausies produced are late generation cats with fully domestic temperaments. Their pedigree registration certificates will usually indicate that they are "C" generation or "SBT" (Stud Book Tradition), which means they are four generations (F4) or more beyond the jungle cat (F. chaus). SBT is the only generation allowed to compete for championship status in TICA shows.

In cases where they are "A" or "B" generation, it is usually because they have been recently outcrossed to another domestic breed to improve specific cosmetic traits, but the cats are nonetheless more than four generations (F4) beyond the handful of non-domestic ancestors.

=== Outcrosses ===
Although the official, permissible outcrosses for the Chausie breed during early breed development were the Abyssinian and domestic shorthair (non-pedigreed cat), in practice any kind of purely domestic outcross could be used. TICA rules only dictated that cats must be a certain number of generations removed from the jungle cat ancestors (F4) and have three generations of registered Chausie ancestors to be eligible for competition at shows (SBT). Consequently, a variety of breeds, albeit usually lively outgoing breeds, were used to develop the Chausie breed and continue to be used occasionally as outcrosses. This has given the breed a diverse and healthy genetic foundation.

== Characteristics ==
=== Appearance ===
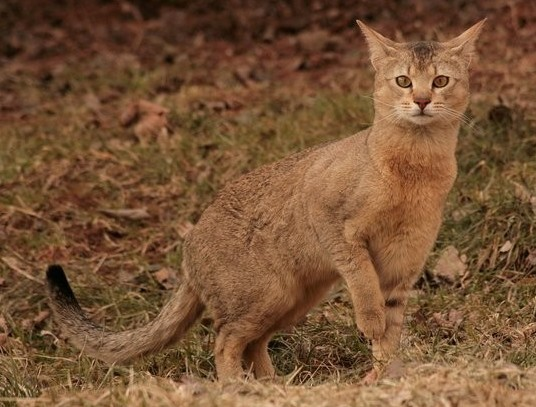
Black ticked tabby adult

==== Body ====
Chausies are bred to be medium to large in size, as compared to traditional domestic breeds. Adult Chausie males typically weigh 5–7.5 kg (11–16 lb). Adult females are usually 3.5–6 kg (8–13 lb). However, because Chausies are built for running and jumping, they are long-bodied and leggy with medium boning. The torso is deep-chested with flat sides. The ears are broad, tall, and set high on the head, about two fingers apart. The cheekbones are striking—prominent, long, and angular—and the eyes are flattened on top and form a half oval below.

==== Coat colours and patterns ====
The TICA Chausie breed standard allows three colours: solid black, black grizzled tabby, and black (a.k.a. brown) ticked tabby. Because the Chausie breed is relatively new, Chausies are still frequently born that have a variety of other colours and patterns, but only cats in the three permissible colours can be entered in new breed classes at cat shows, and only the three colours will be eligible eventually for championship classes. Gold or yellow eye colour is preferred, though yellower and lighter shades of green are allowed.

Solid black Chausies may have faint tabby markings (called ghost markings) as kittens, but usually acquire a dense, even black pigmentation with maturity. Sometimes black grizzled tabby Chausies will appear indistinguishable from solid black Chausies when the amount of grizzling is minimal. Exposure to strong sunlight, as with most black cats, can cause black Chausies to lighten slightly and appear brownish.

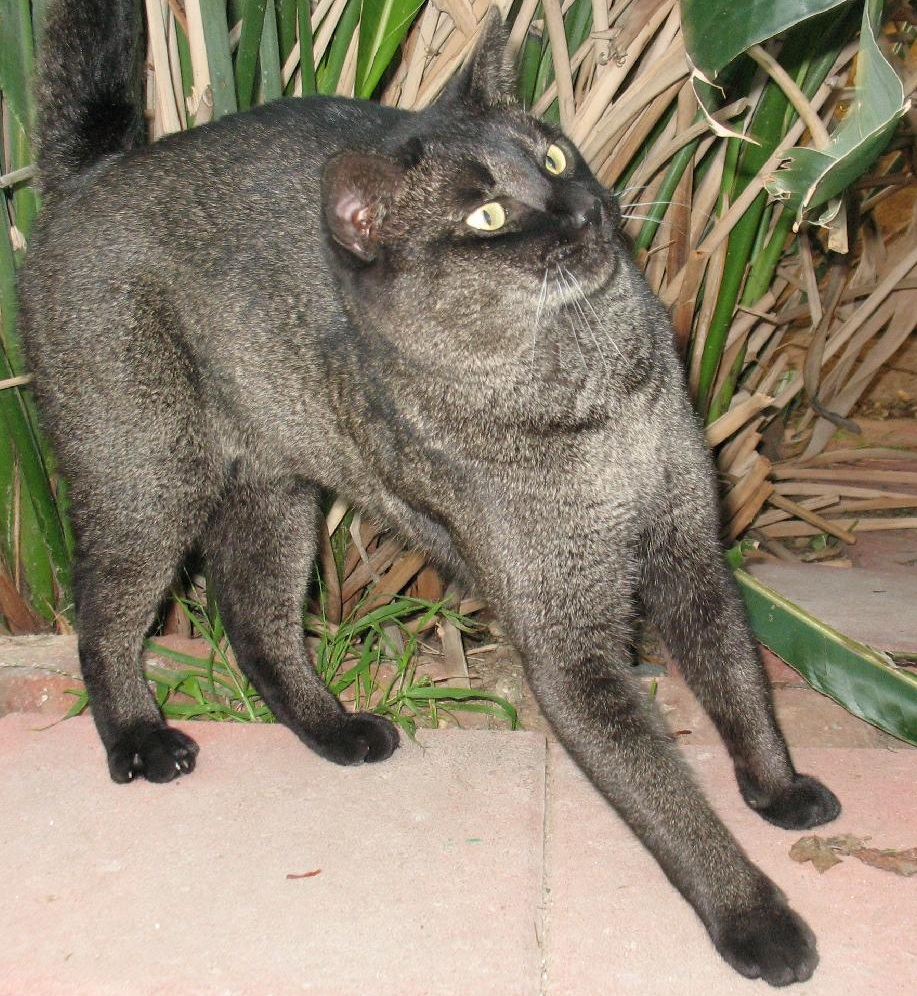
Black grizzled tabby variety adult

Black grizzled tabbies are unique to the Chausie breed among domestic cats. The grizzled pattern comes from the jungle cat; it is never found in domestic cats unless they have F. chaus ancestors. The kittens are often born completely black, although occasionally they may have a bit of light coloured fur on the chin or neck at birth. As the kittens get older, they begin to look more and more like tabbies. However, they are tabbies with black on black markings. That is, the background colour is a sort of dark brownish black, and the markings, such as the mid-line stripe on the spine, are pure black. In addition, alternating bands of off-white appear on individual hairs in the background colour. The bands are along the middle of each hair. The root of each hair is mousey grey, while the tip of each hair is black. The off-white banding or "ticking" usually appears first on the neck, chin, and belly, as well as the insides of the ears. Later, the grizzling will often extend up the sides from belly to almost the spine. In the most heavily grizzled cats, the grizzling extends over the back of the neck, on the face, and even on the legs and tail. Usually the grizzling is complete by age 3 years. Grizzling does have a wide range of expression, however, and some cats never have more than a few banded hairs in the ears or in one spot on the belly, occasionally not even that.

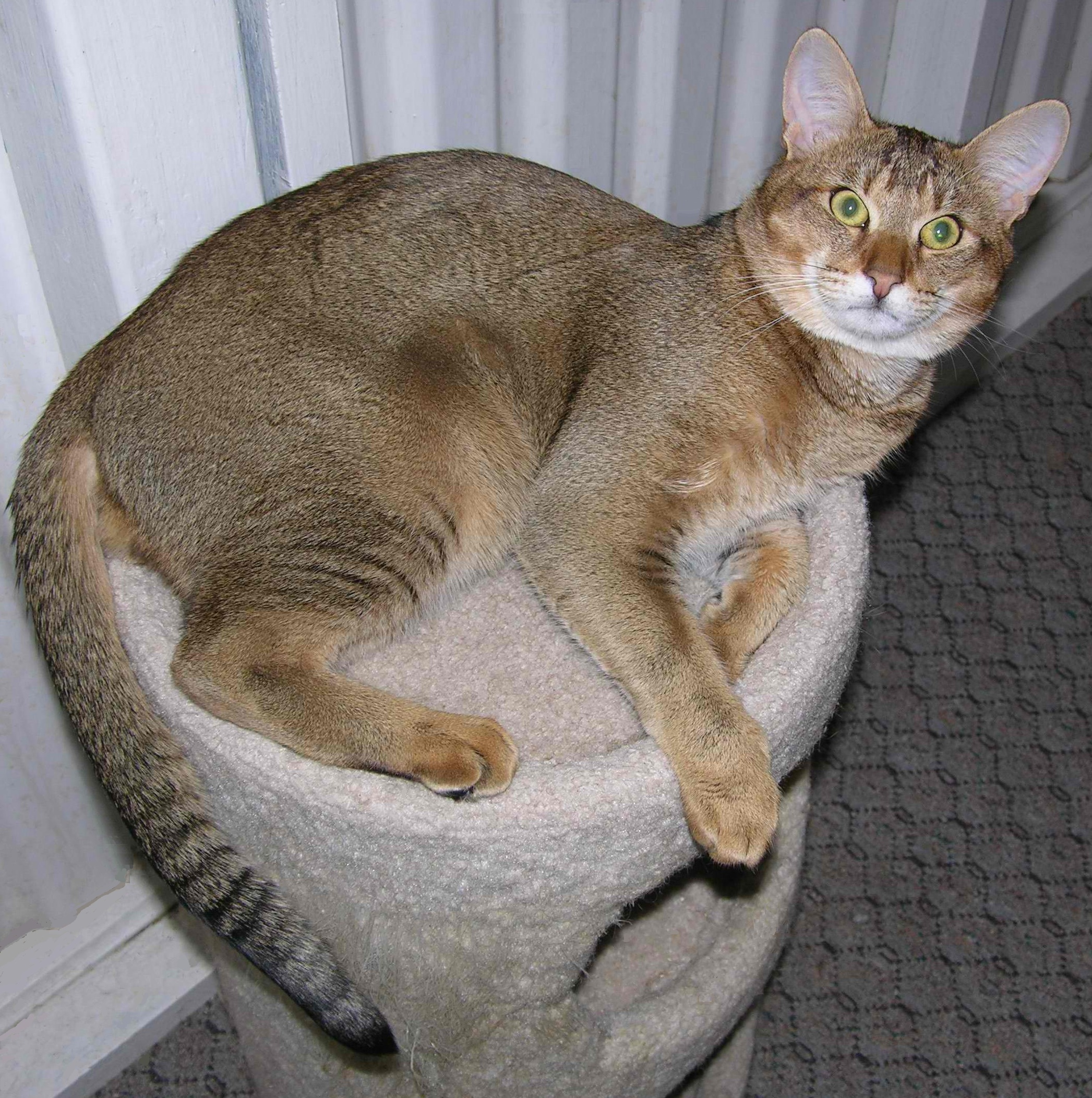
Black ticked tabby adult

Black ticked tabby Chausies have black ticking, black stripes on the inside of the upper legs and to a lesser extent on the outside, black rings on the tail, a black tail tip, and black tabby markings around the eyes. They are also known as "brown" ticked tabbies because, although the markings are black, the background colour is brownish. The background colour can vary in hue across a large range. However, Chausie breeders try to avoid producing the very reddish brown background colour (high degree of rufism), as seen in the Abyssinian breed. Background colours may be reddish gold, it may be a light golden brown, warm beige, cold beige, and even a very cool light grey with just a hint of brown in it. Random polygenes influence the background colour. Every time a black ticked tabby kitten is born, breeders start guessing what the background colour will be, but it cannot be known for certain until the cat ages.

=== Behaviour ===
Because breeders hybridised the foundation jungle cats to mostly intelligent, outgoing breeds such as the Abyssinian and Oriental Shorthair, Chausies are intelligent, active, athletic cats. They are often very "busy" as kittens. As adults, they are quieter, but they still retain a playfulness and lifelong curiosity. Chausies do not like to be alone; they need to have other cats as companions or have human company most of the time. Chausies get along well with dogs, too, and will do fine if raised with a canine in the house. Additionally, Chausies form deep bonds with people. They are loyal, and may have difficulty adjusting if re-homed as adults.

== Health ==
As with all non-domestic hybrid source breeds, some Chausies may inherit intestinal tracts similar to that of the non-domestic ancestors. The intestinal tract may be a little shorter than that of the traditional over elongated domestic cat's. A shorter intestinal tract is known to be incapable of processing ingredients derived from plants. Ingredients in food may serve as triggers for chronic intestinal inflammation and eventually lead to chronic inflammatory bowel disease. Regardless of the cause, Chausies do seem somewhat prone to developing food allergies.

== Legal restrictions ==
In the Netherlands and Belgium (Flanders and Brussels) it is illegal to own or breed jungle cats and also their F1–F4 generation hybrid Chausies offspring.

== See also ==
- Other felid hybrid breeds of domestic cat:
  - Bengal cat
  - Kanaani cat
  - Savannah cat
- List of experimental cat breeds

== Notes ==
- Bird, C. "The Chausie: The Cat That Came Up From the Reeds." In: TICA Trend. Harlingen, TX: The International Cat Association, Inc., Dec. 2009/Jan. 2010, Vol. 31 No. 1.
- "Chausie—Breed Standard and Photos (On-line)". Chausie Breed Committee, TICA. Archived from the original on 2 June 2012.
- Malek, J. (1993). The Cat in Ancient Egypt. London: British Museum Press.
- Sunquist, M.; Sunquist, F. (2002). Wild Cats of the World. Chicago: University of Chicago Press. pp. 60–66.
- "Chausie (On-line)" (PDF). TICA Breed Introductions. Archived from the original (PDF) on 11 September 2012.
- "Chausie (CU)" (PDF). TICA Breed Standards. Archived from the original (PDF) on 12 March 2013.
