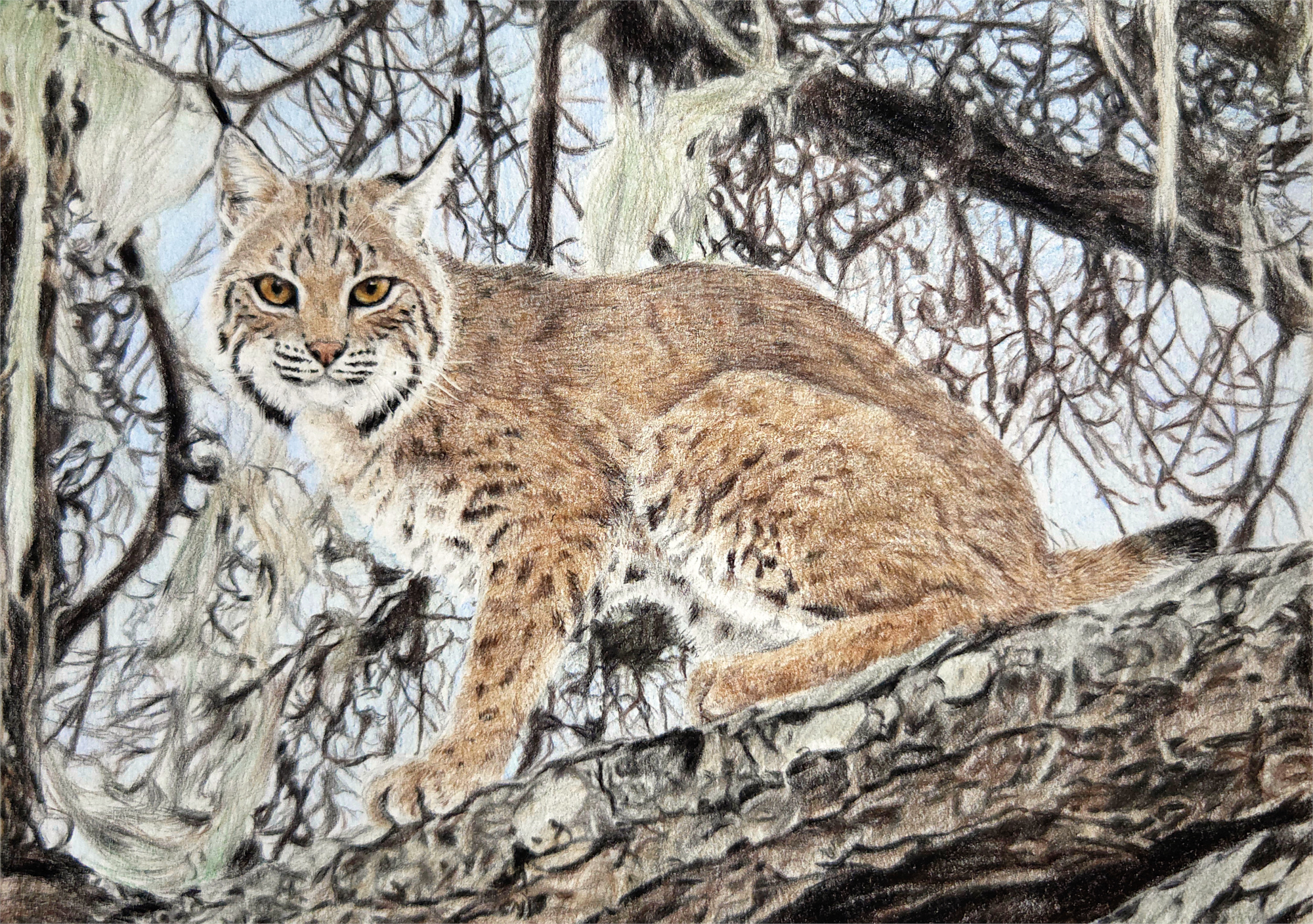

Scientific classification
- Kingdom: Animalia
- Phylum: Chordata
- Class: Mammalia
- Infraclass: Placentalia
- Order: Carnivora
- Family: Felidae
- Subfamily: Felinae
- Genus: Lynx
- Species: L. rufus × L. canadensis

= Blynx =

Hybrid

A blynx is the hybrid offspring of a bobcat and a Canada lynx, two closely related species in the genus Lynx.

== Reported bobcat/lynx hybrids ==
The first evidence of a blynx, based on genetic analysis, was reported from Minnesota.

In August 2003, biologists in Maine captured a blynx and deemed it a sterile fluke of nature. They released it with a tracking collar to observe its behavior; the collar was placed too tightly, however, and the blynx died of starvation.

Soon after, another reported blynx was seen in Michigan, this one a female with a litter of kittens. This disproved the theory that the blynx was a sterile hybrid like the mule. Another female blynx gave birth in summer 2003 in Maine after being trapped that winter.

== Appearance ==
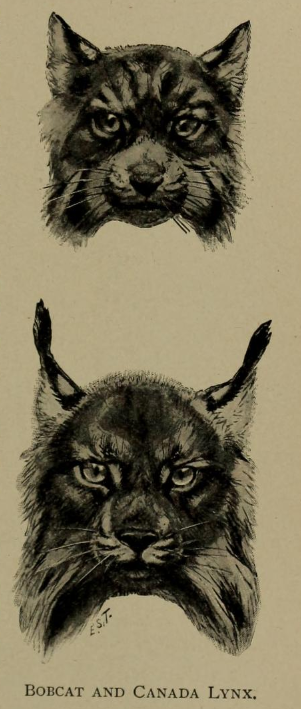

A blynx is a medium-sized cat, larger than a domestic cat, with ears that lean back and are black at the feathery tips (like its Canada lynx parent). The face more closely resembles that of its bobcat parent, and it may or may not have spots. Like both parents, it has a very short tail, with white-colored hair on the underside (typical of bobcat) and a solid black tail tip (typical of Canada lynx). The size of the feet is also intermediate between the two parent species.
