= Savannah cat =

Hybrid breed of cat

Savannah
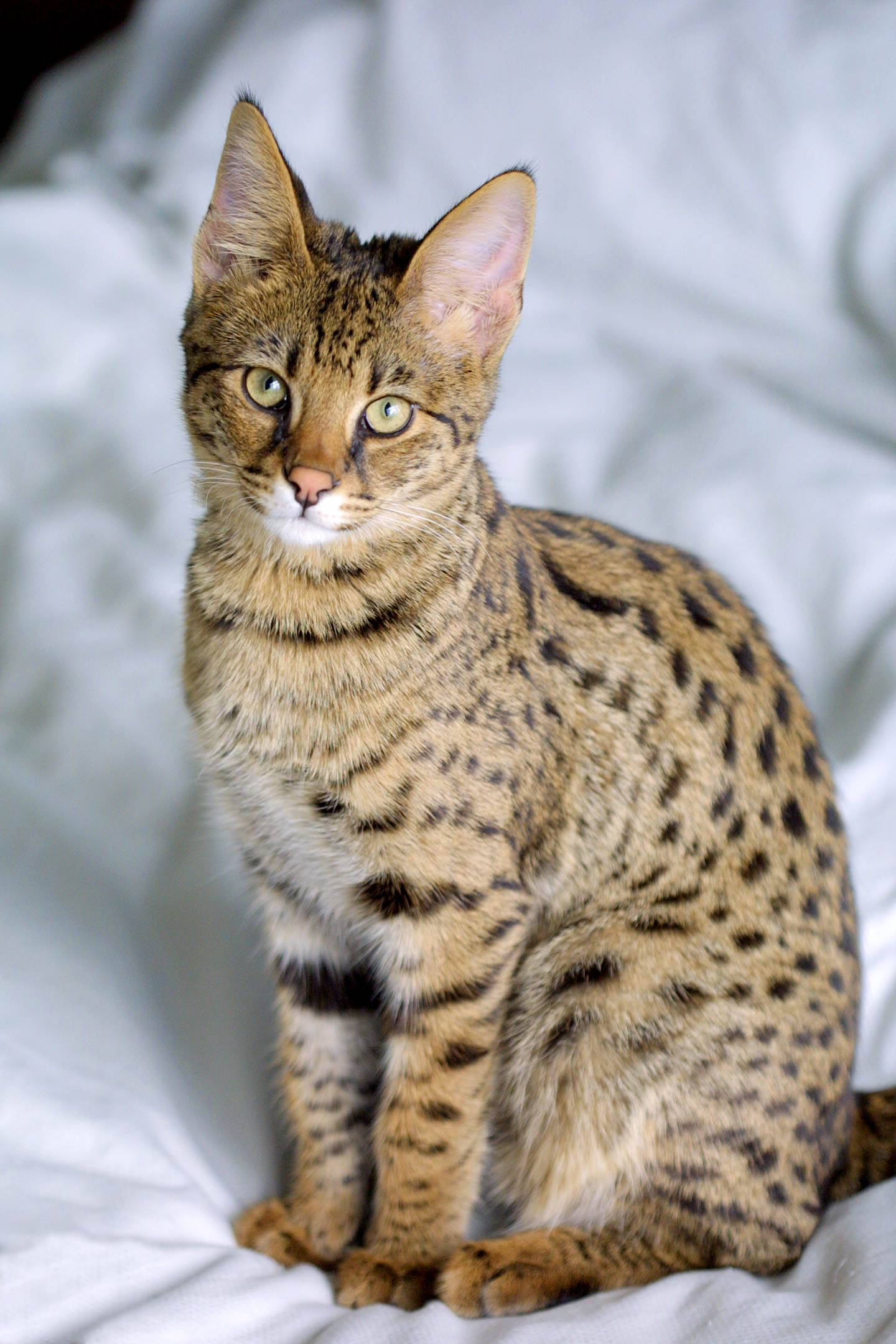
- Origin: United States

Breed standards
- TICA: standard
- WCF: standard
- CCA-AFC: standard

The Savannah is a breed of hybrid cat developed in the late 20th century from hybridisation of a serval (Leptailurus serval) with a domestic cat (Felis catus). This hybridisation typically produces large and lean offspring, with the serval's characteristic large ears and markedly black spotted coats. F1 and F2 male Savannahs can be very large, and in 2016 an F2 male attained a world record for tallest cat at 48.4 centimetres (19.1 in). However, show-eligible F4–F5 cats range from 5.0–8.2 kilograms (11.0–18.1 lb), and therefore comparable in size to other large domestic cat breeds such as the Maine Coon or Norwegian Forest cat.

== History ==
On 7 April 1986, Judee Frank hybridised a male serval, belonging to Suzi Wood, with a Siamese domestic cat to produce the first Savannah cat, a female named Savannah. That first Savannah was bred with a Turkish Angora male and gave birth to viable F2 kittens in April 1989. In 1996, Patrick Kelley and Joyce Sroufe wrote the original version of the Savannah breed standard and presented it to the board of The International Cat Association (TICA). In 2001, the board accepted it as a new registered breed, and in May 2012, TICA granted the Savannah with championship status (for F4 and later generations).

== Characteristics ==
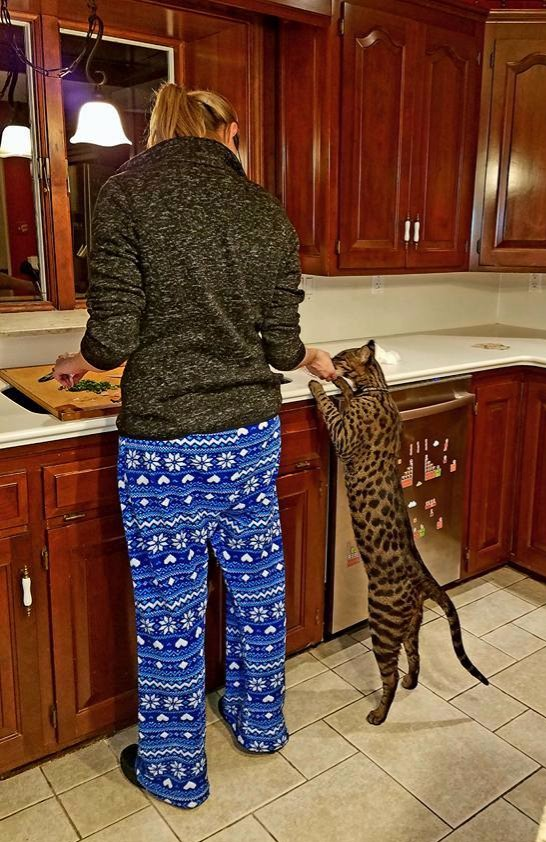
Arcturus Aldebaran Powers, an F2 male granted the Guinness World Records for the tallest cat at 48.4 cm (19.1 in)

=== Appearance ===
==== Size ====
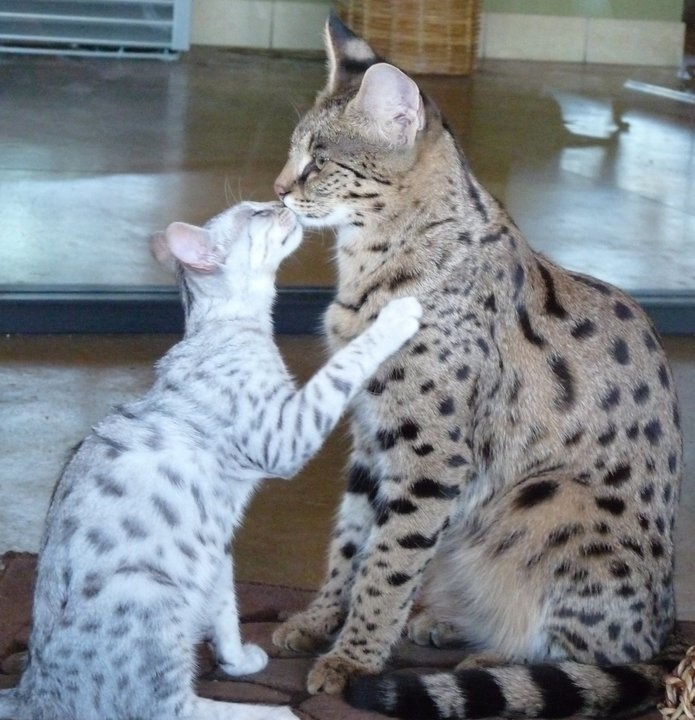
A black silver spotted tabby F4 hybrid (left) and a black spotted tabby F1 hybrid (right).

The Savannah's tall and slim build give them the appearance of greater size than their actual weight. Size is very dependent on generation and sex. Early (F1–F2) generations are usually the largest due to the stronger genetic influence of the African serval ancestor, usually weighing 4.5–11 kg (9.9–24.3 lb), although there is considerable financial incentive for breeders to produce F1 cats as large as possible; some are the size of dogs and can weigh 18 kg (40 lb) or more, and in the US can fetch very high prices. Later-generation Savannahs are comparable in size to other large domestic cat breeds, weighing usually between 3.5–8.2 kg (7.7–18.1 lb). Like most cat breeds, males tend to be larger than females, and as with other hybrid cat breeds such as the Chausie and Bengal, most F1 Savannah cats will possess many of the exotic traits from the wild (serval) ancestor, which recede in later generations.

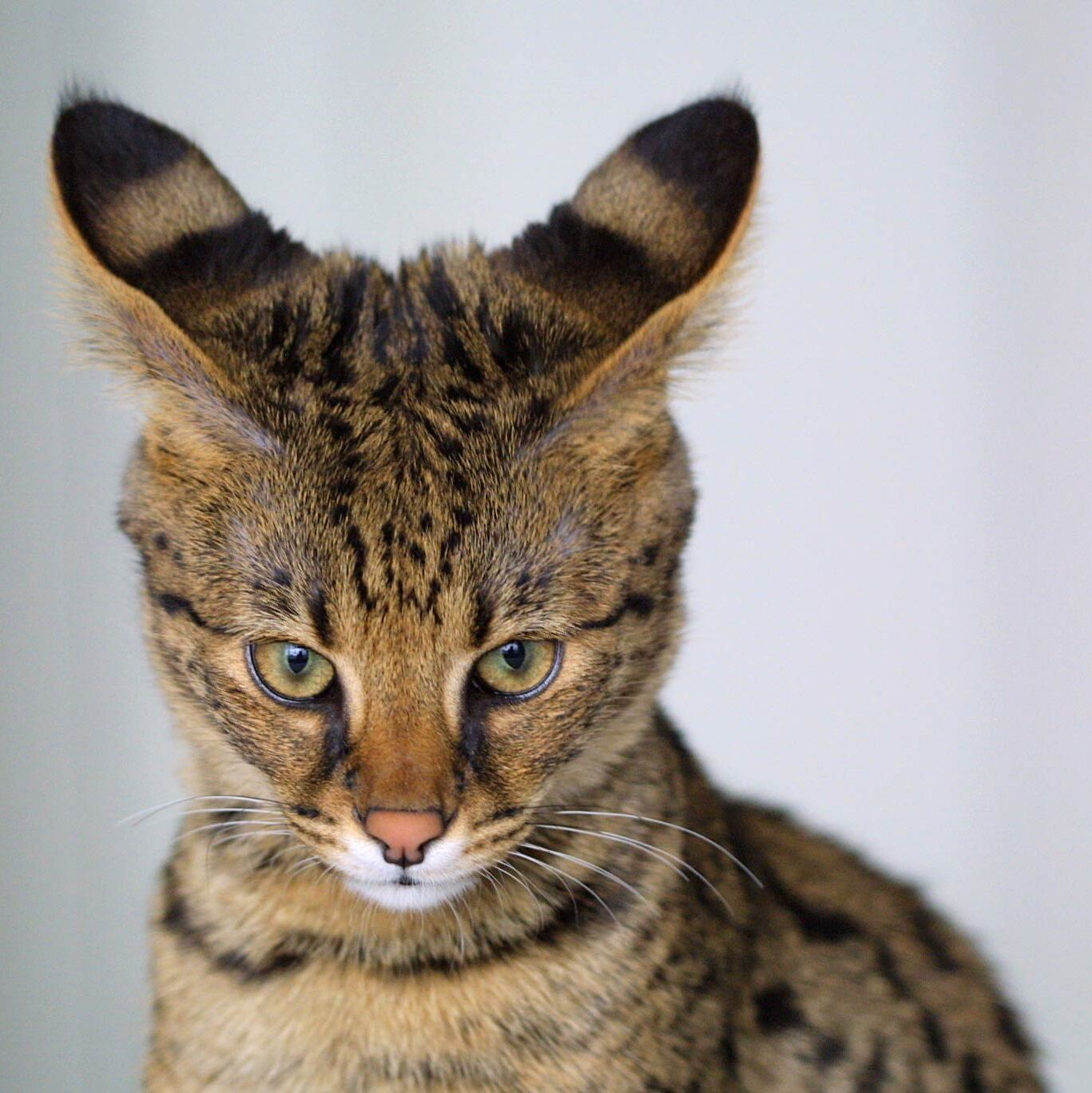
Close-up showing ocelli behind the ears and tear-stain markings below the eyes on a four-month-old F1 kitten

=== Distinctive features ===
The Savannah cat's appearance is influenced by specific serval characteristics. These include the distinctive colour markings, the large and erect ears, long body and legs, wide noses and hooded eyes. When a Savannah is standing, its hind end is often higher than its prominent shoulders. The small head is taller than wide, and the cat has a long, slender neck. The back of the ears have ocelli—a central light band bordered by black, dark grey or brown, giving an eye-like effect. The short tail has black rings, with a solid black tip. The eyes are blue in kittens (as in other cats), and may be green, brown, gold or of a blended shade in the adult. The eyes have a "boomerang" shape, with a hooded brow to protect them from harsh sunlight. Ideally, black or dark "tear-streak" or "cheetah tear" markings run from the corner of the eyes down the sides of the nose to the whiskers.

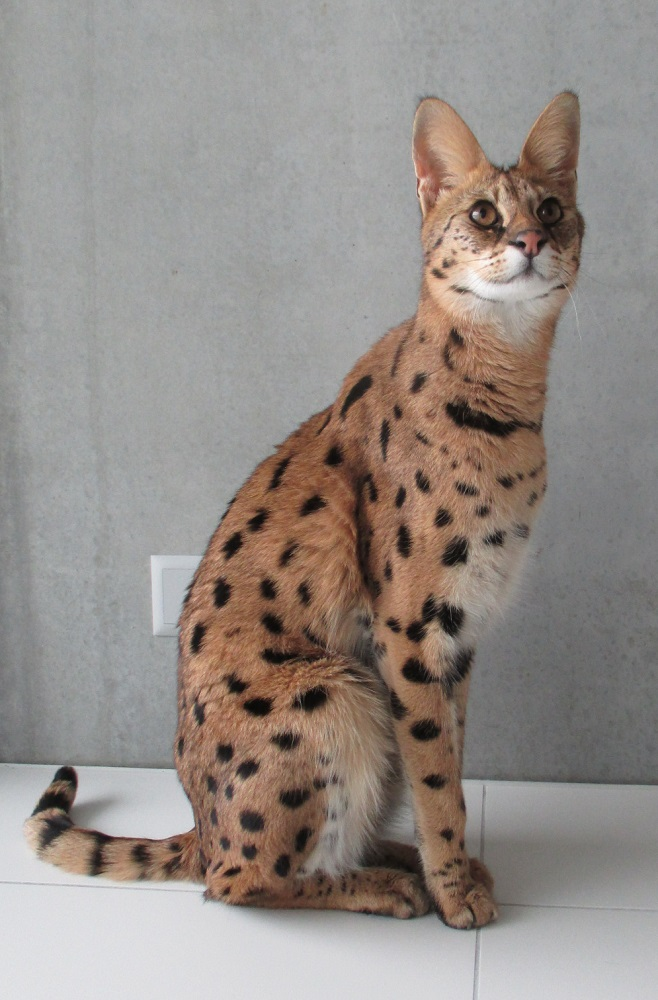
3-years-old male

=== Coat ===
The coat of a Savannah should have a spotted pattern, the only pattern accepted by the TICA breed standard. The standard also allows four colours: black spotted tabby (cool to warm brown, tan or gold with black or dark brown spots), black silver spotted tabby (silver coat with black or dark grey spots), black (black with black spots), and black smoke (black-tipped silver with black spots).

Other, non-standard patterns and colours can occur, including rosettes, marble, "snow" (point), blue, cinnamon, chocolate, lilac (lavender) and other diluted colours derived from domestic sources of cat coat genetics.

=== Behaviour ===
Many Savannah cats do not fear water, and will play in or even immerse themselves in water.

Savannahs, particularly the earlier generations, can sometimes exhibit undesirable wild or territorial behaviours, and in males, aggression and marking. Problems with litter box training are a common cause of owners abandoning or surrendering them to rescue centres.

== Reproduction and genetics ==
=== Hybridisation ===
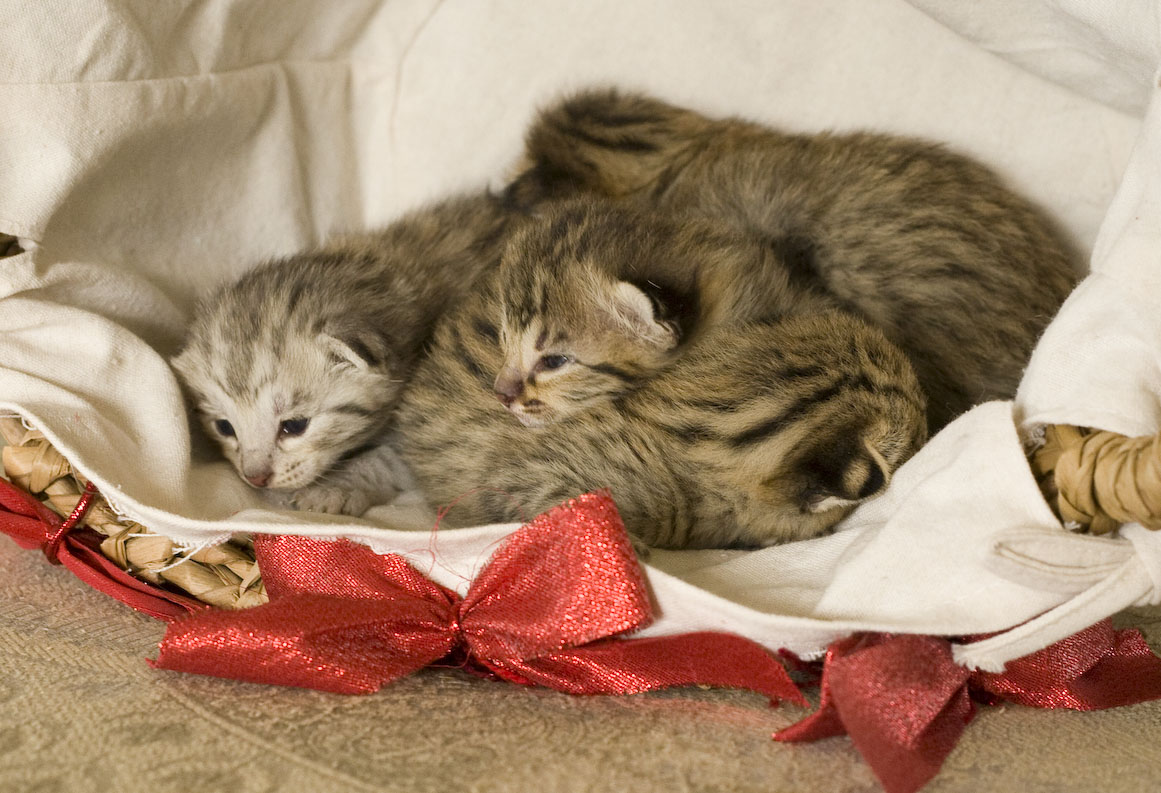
F2 "B" kittens at one week of age

As Savannahs are produced by hybridisation of servals and domestic cats, each generation of Savannahs is marked with a filial number (F#). For example, the cats produced directly from a serval × domestic cat hybrid cross are termed F1 (50% serval), of which the males are sterile.

F1 generation Savannahs are very difficult to produce, due to the significant difference in gestation periods between the serval and a domestic cat (75 days for a serval and 65 days for a domestic cat) and incompatibilities between the two species' sex chromosomes. Pregnancies are often resorbed or aborted, or kittens are born prematurely. Also, servals can be very picky in choosing mates, and often will not mate with, or will even attack, a domestic cat.

Savannah backcrosses, called the BC1 generation, can be as high as 75% serval. Such 75% cats are the offspring of a 50% F1 female bred back to a serval. Cases of 87.5% BC2 Savannah cats are known, but fertility is questionable at those serval percentages. More common than a 75% BC1 is a 62.5% BC1, which is the product of an F2A (25% serval) female bred back to a serval. The F2 generation, which has a serval grandparent and is the offspring of the F1 generation female, ranges from 25% to 37.5% serval. The F3 generation has a serval great grandparent, and is at least 12.5% serval.

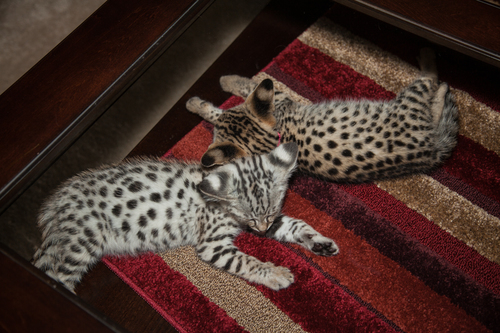
Kittens with breed-standard colours: black silver spotted, left; black spotted, right.

The F4 generation is the first generation that can be classified as a "stud book tradition" (SBT) cat, and is considered "purebred." A Savannah cross may also be referred to by breeders as "SV × SV" (where SV is the TICA code for the Savannah breed). Savannah generation filial numbers also have a letter designator indicating the generation of SV-SV breeding. The designation A means one parent is a Savannah and the other is an outcross. B is used when both parents are Savannahs, with one of them being an A. The C designation is used when both parents are Savannahs and one of them is a B. Therefore, A × (any SV) = B; B × (B,C,SBT) = C; C × (C, SBT) = SBT, SBT × SBT = SBT. F1 generation Savannahs are always A, since the father is a non-domestic outcross (the serval father). The F2 generation can be A or B. The F3 generation can be A, B or C. SBT cats arise in the F4 generation.

Being hybrids, Savannahs typically exhibit some characteristics of hybrid inviability. Because the male Savannah is the heterogametic sex, they are most commonly affected, in accordance with Haldane's rule. Male Savannahs are typically larger in size and sterile until the F5 generation or so, although the females are fertile from the F1 generation. As of 2011, breeders were noticing a resurgence in sterility in males at the F5 and F6 generations. Presumably, this is due to the higher serval percentage in C and SBT cats. The problem may also be compounded by the secondary non-domestic genes coming from the Asian leopard cat in the Bengal outcrosses that were used heavily in the foundation of the breed.

Females of the F1–F3 generations are usually held back for breeding, with only the males being offered as pets. The reverse occurs in the F5–F7 generations, but to a lesser degree, with the males being held as breeding cats and females primarily offered as pets.

Generation comparison

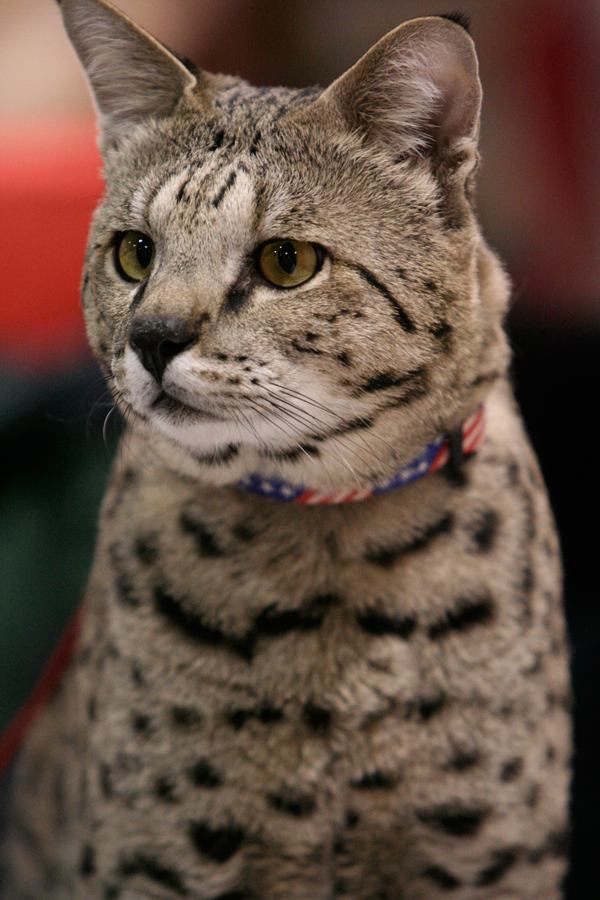
F2

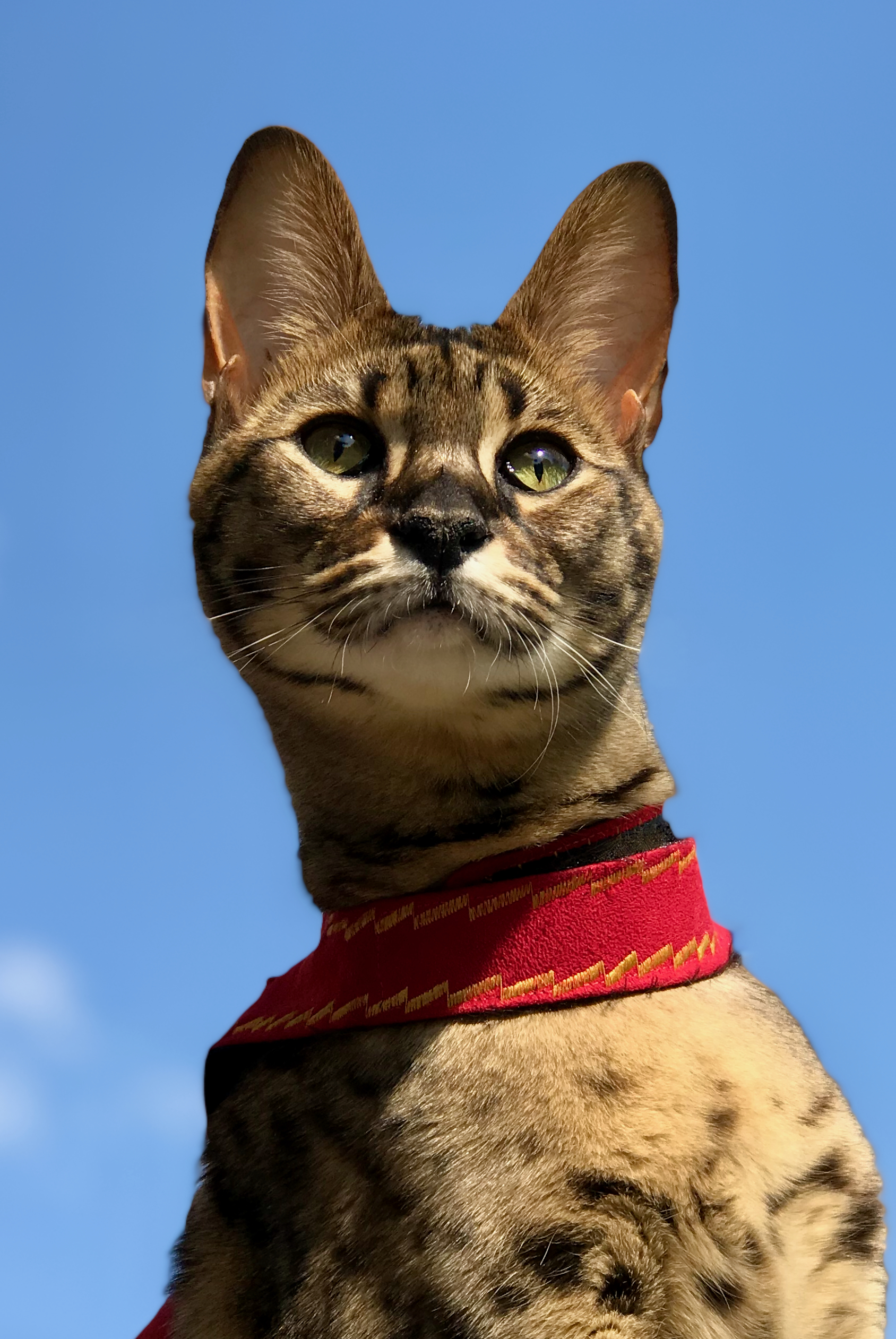
F2 female (2 years)

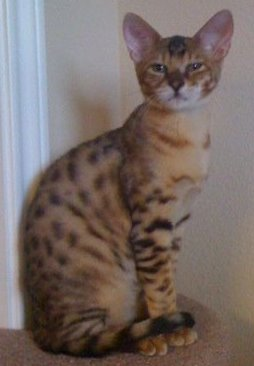
F3 male (1 year)

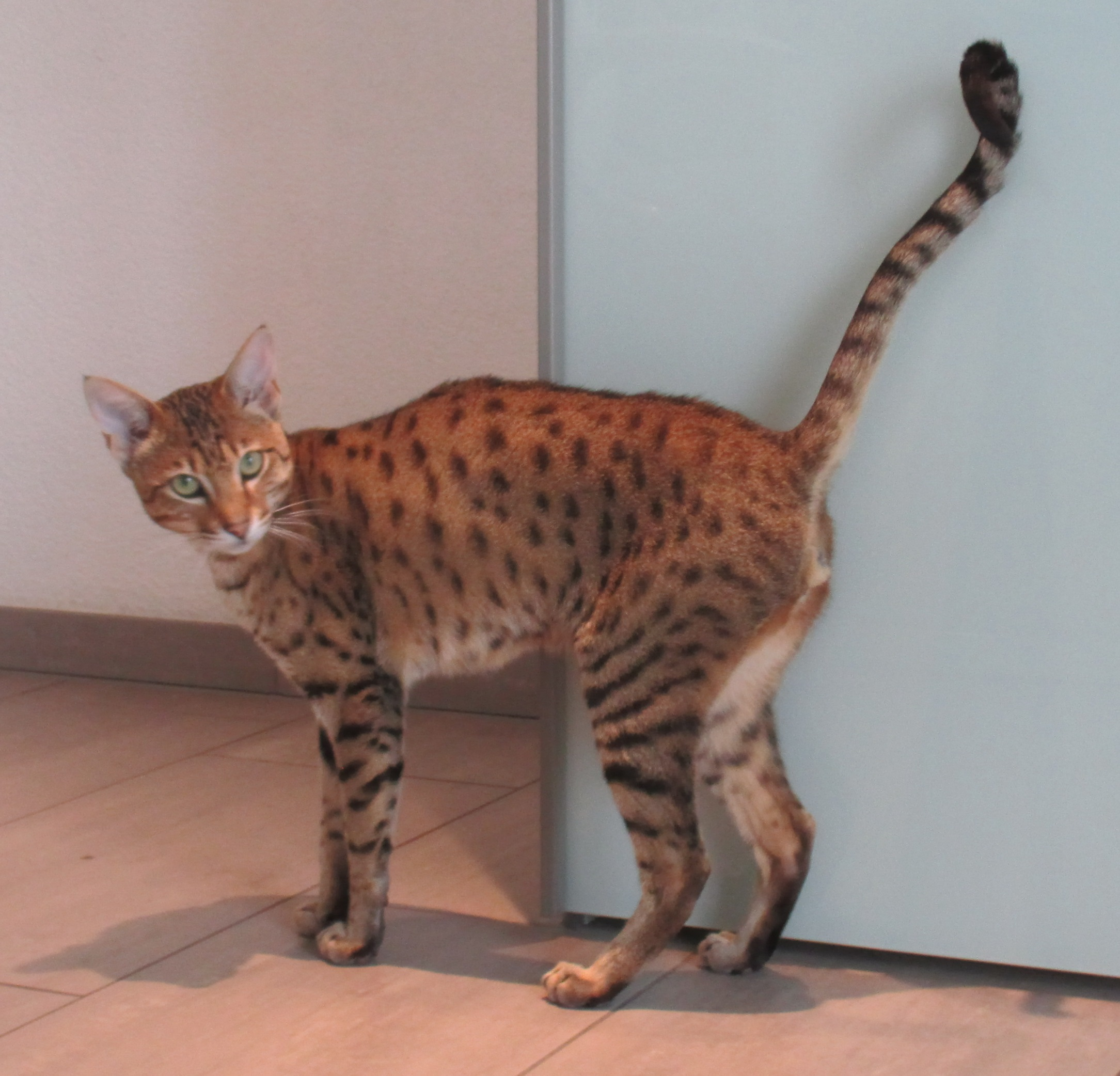
F3 male (1 year)

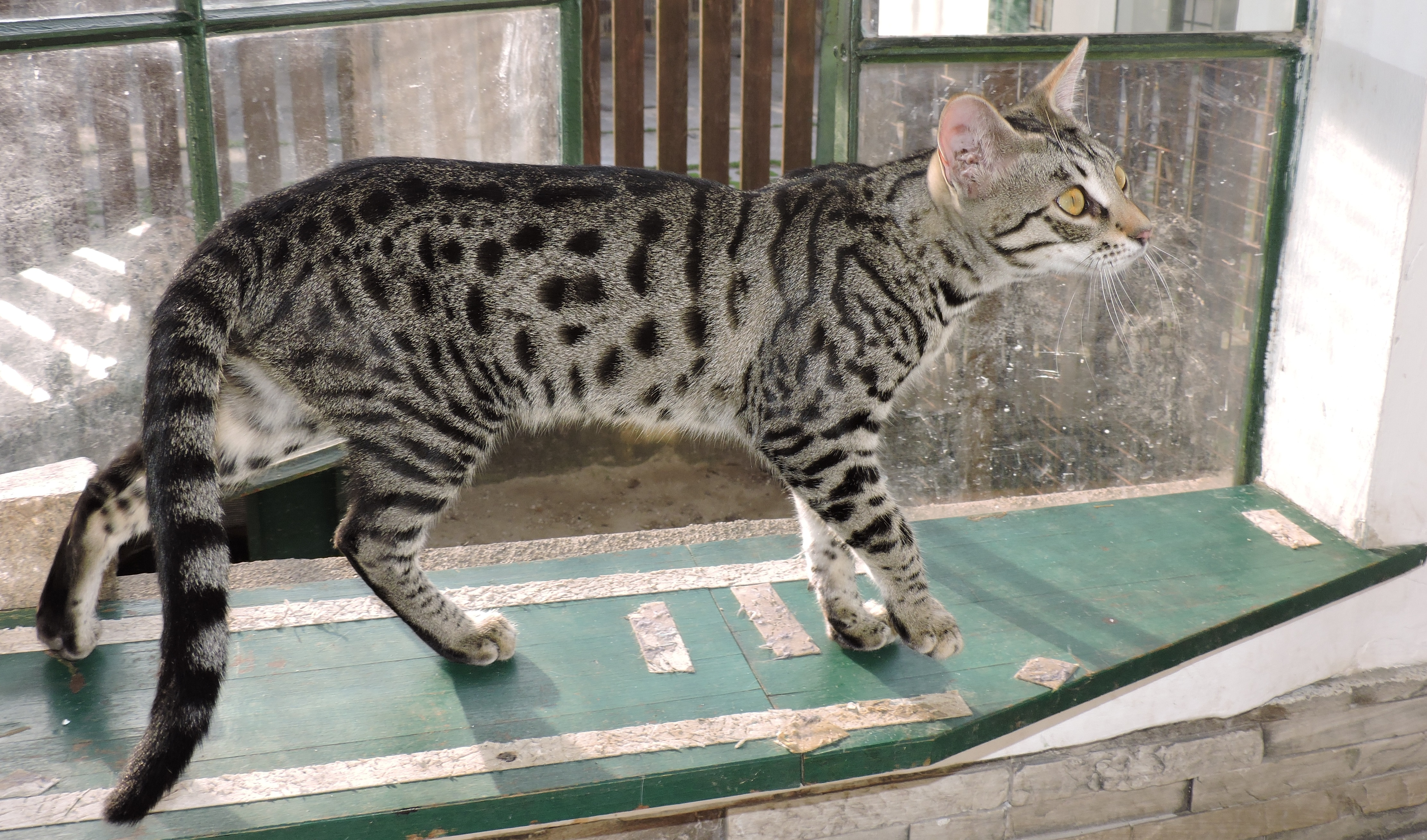
F5 kitten (½ year)

=== Outcrossing ===
The Savannah breed attained TICA championship status in 2012, which means domestic outcrosses are no longer permitted. Since F1–F4 Savannah males are sterile, breeders use F5 males to produce the F2 generation with a F1 female. By 2012 most breeders were performing Savannah-to-Savannah pairings, since many fertile F5 Savannah males were by then available for stud, and outcrosses were considered unnecessary and undesirable.

Domestic outcrosses from the early days in the 1990s greatly impacted the breed's development in both desired and non-desired traits. Outcrosses previously permitted for the TICA Savannah breed standard before 2012 were the Egyptian Mau, Ocicat, Oriental Shorthair, and Domestic Shorthair. Outcrosses not permitted included the Bengal and Maine Coon, which brought many unwanted genetic influences.

== Health ==
Savannah cats are more likely to develop hypertrophic cardiomyopathy (HCM) than other domestic breeds. The Savannah Cat Association recommends cats are screened for HCM, as well as progressive retinal atrophy (PRA) and pyruvate kinase deficiency (PK-Def), which can cause blindness and anaemia, respectively.

Savannahs and servals have similar anaesthesia requirements to other domestic cat breeds, including hybrids; ketamine, medetomidine, butorphanol, and atipamezole antagonist have all been found safe for use in servals.

== Legal restrictions ==
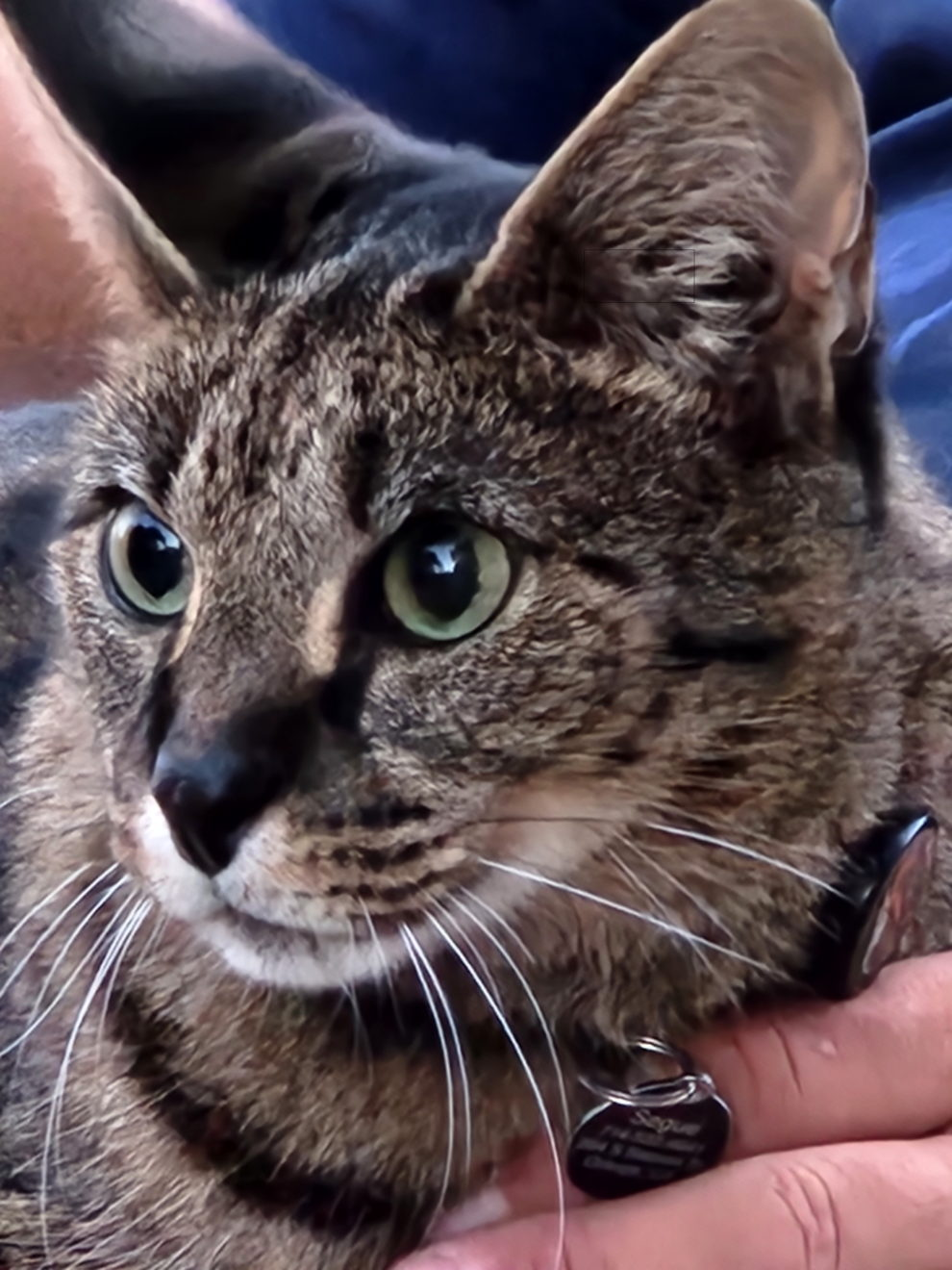
12-year-old male F1 cat. Like a serval's nose, the nose leather wraps from the front to the top.

Laws governing ownership of Savannah cats in the United States vary according to state. While most states follow the code set by the USDA which defines hybrid cross cats as domesticated, some states have set more restrictive laws on ownership, including Hawaii, Massachusetts, Texas and Georgia. Additionally, municipal laws can differ from the state; for example, Savannahs (F5 and later generations) are allowed by New York state, but not by the city of New York.

The Australian federal government has banned the importation of the Savannah cat into Australia, as the larger cats could potentially threaten species of the country's native wildlife not threatened by smaller domestic cats. A government report on the proposed importation of the cats has warned the hybrid breed may introduce enhanced hunting skills and increased body size into feral cat populations, putting native species at risk.

For similar reasons Savannahs cannot be imported into New Zealand, which has banned importing any hybrid dog or cat other than Bengal cats.

Savannah cats are legal in every province of Canada, although some provinces have restrictions on the ownership of F1 and F2 generations, and importing Savannahs from the United States requires rabies vaccination and special permits.

In the Netherlands and Belgium (Flanders and Brussels) it is illegal to own or breed Servals and also their F1–F4 generation hybrid Savannah offspring.

Many other nations have few or no restrictions on F2 and later generations.

== See also ==
- Other felid hybrid breeds of domestic cat:
  - Bengal cat
  - Chausie
  - Kanaani cat
- List of experimental cat breeds
