= Felid hybrids =

Hybrid carnivore

Authenticated felid hybrids

A felid hybrid is any of a number of hybrids between various species of the cat family, Felidae, including the subfamily Felinae (feline hybrids).

Hybrids between two species of the genus Panthera (lions, tigers, jaguars, and leopards) are Panthera hybrids. There are no known hybrids between Neofelis (the clouded leopard) and other genera. By contrast, many genera of Felinae are interfertile with each other, though few hybridize under natural conditions, and not all combinations are likely to be viable (e.g. between the tiny rusty-spotted cat and the leopard-sized cougar).

== All-wild feline hybridization ==
=== Caracal × serval hybrids ===
A caraval is a cross between a male caracal (Caracal caracal) and a female serval (Leptailurus serval), while a male serval's and female caracal's offspring are called servicals. The first servicals were bred accidentally when the two animals were housed together at the Los Angeles Zoo. The offspring were tawny with pale spots.

=== Bobcat × Canada lynx ===
The blynx or lynxcat is a hybrid of a bobcat (Lynx rufus) and the canada lynx (Lynx canadensis). At least seven such hybrids have been reported in the United States, outside of captivity. In August 2003, two wild-occurring hybrids between wild Canada lynx and bobcats were confirmed by DNA analysis in the Moosehead region of Maine. Three hybrids were identified in northeastern Minnesota. These were the first confirmed hybrids outside of captivity. Mitochondrial DNA studies showed them all to be the result of matings between female Canada lynx and male bobcats. A male Canada lynx bobcat hybrid was trapped in 1998, radio-collared and released, only to die of starvation. The female hybrid was fertile. In November 2003, a spotted lynxcat was observed in Illinois, 800 km (500 mi) from normal lynx territory, but it may have been an escaped hybrid pet.

The hybrids closely resembled bobcats with larger bodies and smaller feet, but had some lynx-like features: long ear tufts and almost completely black-tipped tails. The Canada lynx is a protected species in 14 US states constituting the southern part of its historic range, but the hybrids are not protected and may be shot by hunters. However, some of odd-looking Lynx may be colour morphs of either bobcats or Canada lynx rather than hybrids. This poses the danger that protected Canada lynx are being killed.

=== European wildcat × jungle cat ===
The Euro-chaus is a human-induced hybrid between the European wildcat (Felis silvestris) and the jungle cat species (Felis chaus). It should not be confused with the Euro-chausie, which is a cross between the domestic Chausie breed and a European wildcat.

=== Margay × ocelot ===
The marlot is a hybrid between a male margay (Leopardus wiedii) and female ocelot (L. pardalis). In May 1977, the Long Island Ocelot Club (LIOC) announced the birth of a marlot bred by Barbara Brocks using captive-bred parents. There was no description of the marlot, but the parent species both have rosetted or marbled patterns on a sandy background.

=== Margay × oncilla hybridization attempts ===
There were attempts to breed the margay with the oncilla (Leopardus tigrinus) by Dutch breeder Mme Falken-Rohrle in the 1950s. These appear to have been unsuccessful.

=== Puma hybrids ===
In the 19th and 20th centuries, various cougar hybrids with differing big cats were attempted in captivity and reportedly successful, including cougar × leopard (called a pumapard), and cougar × jaguar.

Additionally, at least one instance of hybridization between a cougar and an ocelot has occurred in captivity.

=== Panthera hybrids ===
A Panthera hybrid is a crossbreed between individuals of any of the five species of the genus Panthera: the tiger, lion, jaguar, leopard, and snow leopard. Most hybrids would not be perpetuated in the wild as the territories of the parental species do not overlap and the males are usually infertile. Mitochondrial genome research revealed that wild hybrids were also present in ancient times. The mitochondrial genomes of the snow leopard and the lion were more similar to each other than to other Panthera species, indicating that at some point in their history, the female hybrid progeny of male ancestors of modern snow leopards and female ancestors of modern lions interbred with male ancestors of modern snow leopards.

== Domestic × wild hybridization ==
The domestic cat, known variously as Felis catus, F. silvestris catus, or F. lybica catus, a descendant of the African wildcat (F. lybica), has been hybridized with several wild felid species. These wild-domestic hybrids have sometimes been called "feral-domestic hybrids". However, this is a misnomer, because feral refers to a domesticated population species which has reverted to living without human caretakers. Most of these are artificial hybrids (i.e., bred intentionally by humans), though natural hybridization has occurred.

=== Confirmed domestic cat × felid hybrids ===
Some pairings have given rise to more than one variety, bred for distinctive appearances and different percentages of wild felid genes. They may thus form distinct breeds with separate breed standards, though many of these hybrids are not recognized by any major breed registry. At least two are the result of incidental interbreeding without human intervention, but the majority are the result of experimental selective-breeding hybridization for the exotic pet market.

- Bengal: domestic cat × Asian leopard cat (Prionailurus bengalensis, usually the P. b. bengalensis subspecies)
  - Bengal cat § Derived breeds: There are several more domestic cat breeds derived in part from Bengal stock.
- Bristol: domestic cat × margay (Leopardus wiedii); died out in the 1990s due to fertility problems. The few remaining fertile members would be bred into the Bengal breed to improve its genetic diversity.
- Caracat: domestic cat × caracal; first case was accidental in the Moscow Zoo in 1998.
- Chausie: domestic cat × jungle cat species (Felis chaus)
- Kanaani: domestic cat × African wildcat (Felis lybica); commonly known to interbreed where their ranges overlap.
- Kellas cat: domestic cat × Scottish wildcat (Felis silvestris silvestris); naturally occurring landrace.
- Machbagral, viverral, and jambi: domestic cat × fishing cat (Prionailurus viverrinus)
- Marguerite: domestic cat × sand cat (Felis margarita); kittens were born to a domestic female, in 2013 and another 20 hybrids in the United Kingdom in 2017.
- Safari cat: domestic cat × Geoffroy's cat (Leopardus geoffroyi)
- Savannah: domestic cat (including Bengal) × serval (Leptailurus serval)
- Unnamed: domestic cat × Chinese Mountain Cat; hybridization found around the Qinghai-Tibet Plateau in a manner similar to the Kellas cat.
- Unnamed: domestic cat × oncilla (Leopardus tigrinus); all known examples are infertile.

=== Attempted or unconfirmed hybrids ===
- Domestic cat × bobcat (Lynx rufus): There are reports of bobcats breeding with domestic cats, but evidence of offspring remains circumstantial and anecdotal. Their interfertility is yet to be proven scientifically.

== See also ==
- Panthera hybrid

== Other sources ==
- I Kusminych & A Pawlowa ("Ein Bastard von Karakal Hauskatze im Moskauer Zoo" in Der Zoologische Garten Vol. 68, No. 4 (1998)) (A Hybrid of Caracal and House Cat in Moscow Zoo).
- Paul Leyhausen (Oncilla × domestic cat hybrids)
- Mike Tomkies, "Wildcats" (and various other works regarding Scottish Wildcats)
- Frances Pitt, "Wild Animals in Britain" (1939) (Scottish Wildcat hybrids)
- Edward Hamilton, 1896 (Scottish Wildcat hybrids)
- LYNX AND BOBCAT HYBRIDS

== External links and online references ==
- Media related to Felidae hybrids at Wikimedia Commons
- Hybrids between Wild and Domestic Cats
- Hybrid Felids (non-domestic)
- Interesting facts about the hybrid cats (German version)
