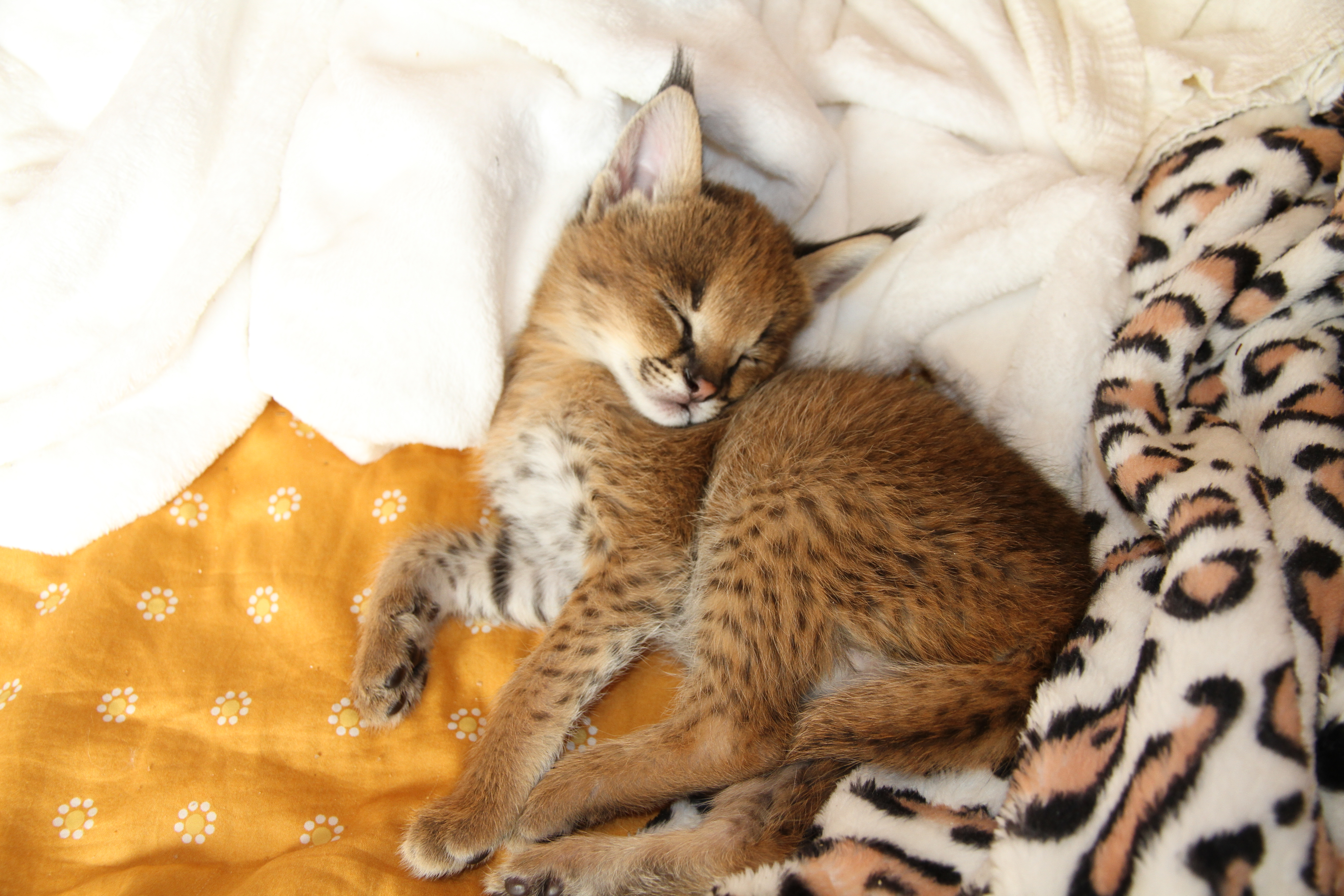
- Caraval kitten

Scientific classification
- Kingdom: Animalia
- Phylum: Chordata
- Class: Mammalia
- Order: Carnivora
- Family: Felidae
- Subfamily: Felinae
- Hybrid: Caracal caracal♂ × Leptailurus serval♀

= Caraval =

Hybrid felines

The caraval (also called a cara-serval) is the hybrid cross between a male caracal and a female serval. They have a spotted pattern similar to the serval, but on a darker background.

A servical is the cross between a male serval and a female caracal. A litter of servicals occurred by accident when the two animals were kept in the same enclosure at Los Angeles Zoo. The hybrids were given to an animal shelter. The only photos show them as tawny kittens.
