= Leslie A. Lyons =

American geneticist & veterinarian

- Scientific career
- Fields: Genetics
- Workplaces: University of Missouri, California National Primate Research Center

Leslie A. Lyons is an associate professor at University of Missouri College of Veterinary Medicine. Her research concentrates on the study of genetics for cats, and the DNA mapping for feline animals.

== Career ==
In 2002, Lyons analyzed the DNA of the world's first cloned cat, a kitten named Cc: and confirmed that it was a genetic copy of its mother.
