= Kanaani cat =

Breed of hybrid cat

Kanaani
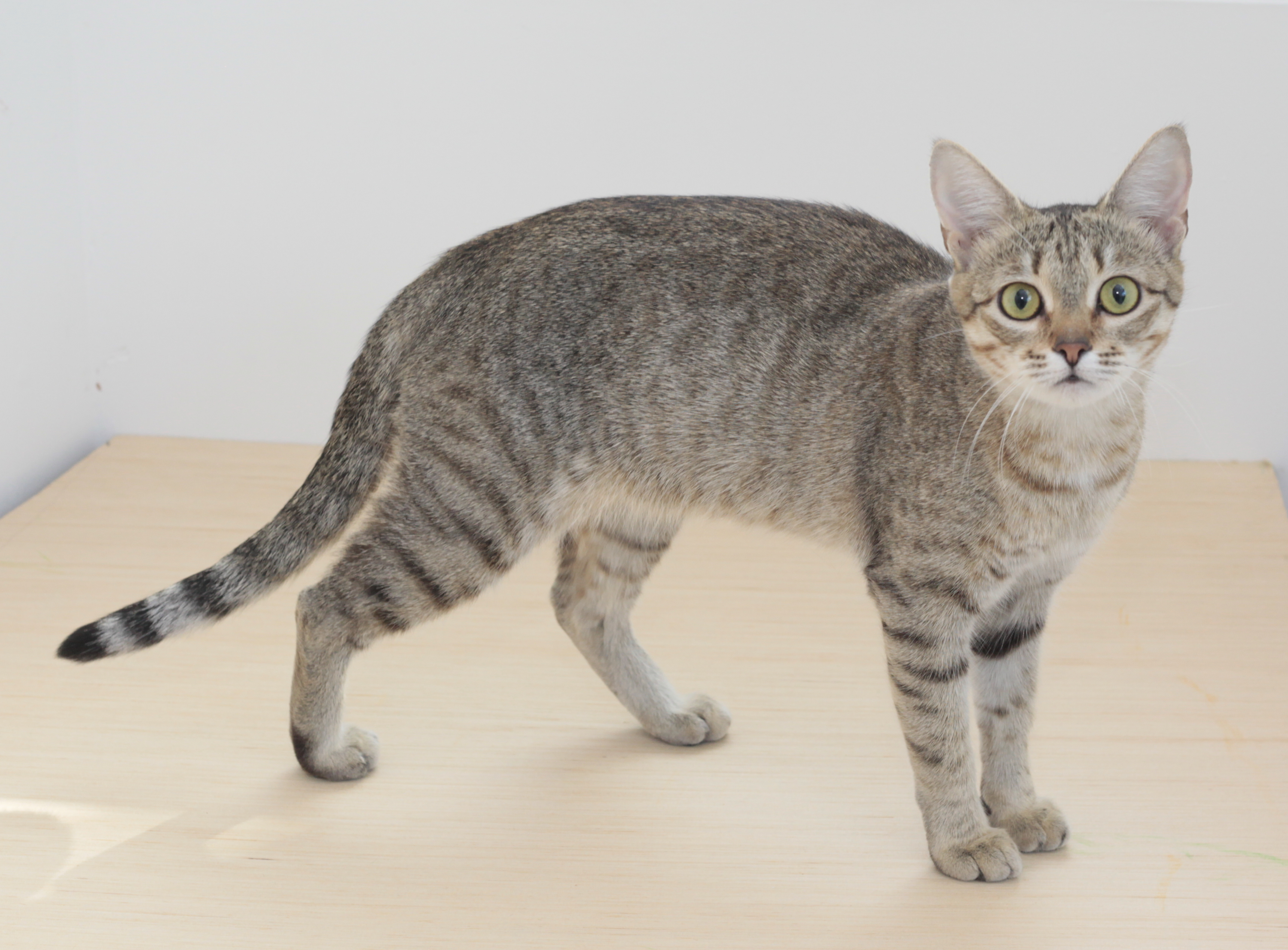
- Black spotted tabby female (Haifa)
- Other names: כנעני
- Common nicknames: Germany stripes
- Origin: Israel

Breed standards
- WCF: standard

Kanaani cat (Hebrew: חתול כנעני) is an experimental breed of short-haired domestic cat, developed in Israel from selectively bred hybrid foundation stock. They originate from hybrid crossing between domestic cats with African wildcats (Felis catus × Felis lybica), hence why the breed retains certain behavioural traits associated with its relatively recent wild ancestry. Its domestication and breed development process remain ongoing. Anno 2026, the World Cat Federation (WFC) is the only major cat registry that recognises the breed.

The cat breed was named after the land of Canaan, the ancient designation for the region encompassing present-day Israel and neighbouring territories. The breed is developed to resemble the native wild steppe cat of the region.

== History ==
The German-Israeli artist Doris Pollatschek is considered to be the founder of the Kanaani cat breed in the 1990s. She developed the breed in Israel and later the efforts were continued in Germany. The foundation stock was bred by Pollatschek from a hybrid cross between a rescued African wildcat with a local domestic stray.

=== 2020s revival programme ===
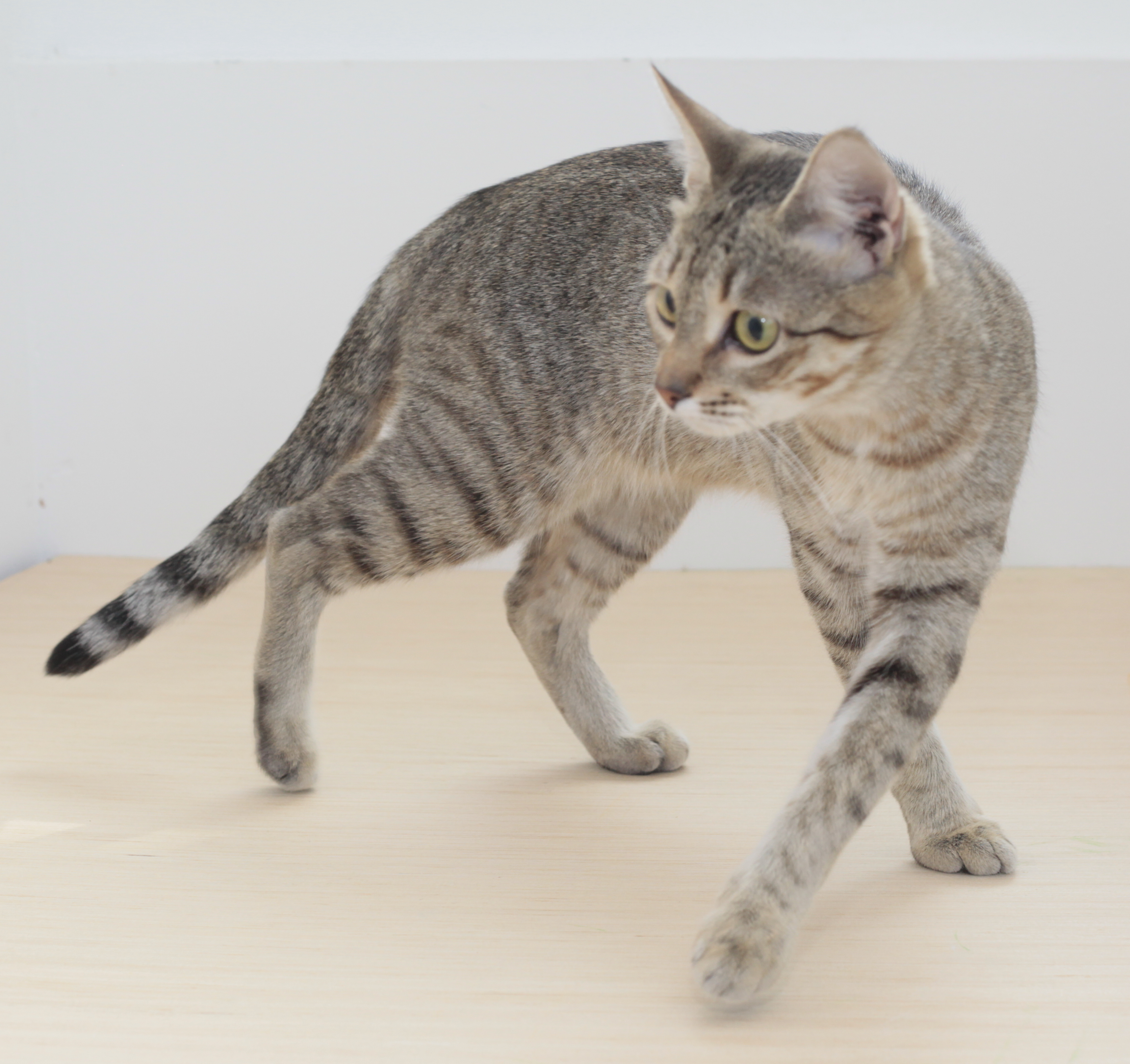
Black spotted tabby female named Haifa, who is one of the three registered Kanaani cats in the world (anno 2026). She is a queen in the "revival" breeding programme led by WFC-breeder Rabbi Michael Salita of Brooklyn, USA.

In the 2020s, WFC-breeder Rabbi Michail Salita (Rav Salita cattery) of Brooklyn, USA, started a breeding programme in an attempt to revive the nearly extinct Kanaani breed with cats bred in Jerusalem by Lyudmila Vlasova. This resulted in the two foundation cats Haifa and Arbuz, and their offspring Laila.

=== Breed registration ===
The Kanaani was officially recognised by the World Cat Federation (WFC) in 2008, becoming the first national cat breed established in Israel. In 2010 the WCF only allowed kittens born after 1 January 2008 to the breed if they were bred from Kanaani parents. The International Cat Association (TICA) allows registration of the experimental Kanaani for recording purposes only, but they do not recognise it as a breed (as of 2026).

The first modern registrations are of the three Kanaani in the 2020s revival programme, and were initially issued by the Association of Rare Breeds of Cats (ARBC) in Ukraine, based on pedigrees prepared by Dr. Anna Kalinichenko. The breed was subsequently entered into the records of Pedigree Club UK, an independent British registry, which recognised the documented lineage. In a further development, the Feline Alliance of Ukraine (FAU), a club affiliated with the WCF, registered the Kanaani cats within the WCF registry, restoring the breed’s recognition in one of the major international cat federations after a prolonged absence.

== Characteristics ==
=== Hybridisation ===
The domestication of the Kanaani occurred through a hybridisation of the local African wildcat (Felis lybica) with Israeli domestic cats. It is still an experimental domestic cat breed, developed to resemble the native wild steppe cat of the former Canaan region. Although fully domestic, it retains phenotypic similarities to the local wild population. The breed typically displays coat colours ranging from beige to brown, characterised by contrasting dark or black stripes or spots in a tabby pattern.

=== Appearance ===
The Kanaani is a medium- to large-sized cat of slender, muscular, and athletic build, combining strength with an overall elegant appearance. The body is elongated and well-muscled. An oriental body type is considered a fault. The legs are long and slender, with oval paws. The tail is long, relatively thick at the base, and tapers towards the tip.

The head is carried on a long, slender neck and forms a broad triangular shape. The skull is flat between the ears, and the cheekbones are prominent without pinch. The slightly arched forehead flows smoothly into a well-defined, straight nose, without stop. The muzzle is slightly flattened, and the chin is firm. The ears are large, broad at the base, and tapering to the tips. They are erect and set wide apart, with the distance between them at least equal to the width of the ear base. Ear tufts are desirable. A thumbprint marking on the back of the ears is characteristic.

The eyes are large, almond-shaped, and set wide apart with a slight oblique slant. Eye colour in adult cats is green, but green to yellow is permitted.

The coat is short, close-lying, and has minimal undercoat. The texture is relatively coarse rather than soft.

Its fur comes in three base colours: black ("seal", "brown"), chocolate ("coffee"), and cinnamon. And with a spotted or blotched ("classic") tabby pattern. Individual hairs are sufficiently long to display clear ticking in both the ground colour and the pattern. The coat colour hues range from beige to cinnamon in the ground colour, overlaid with dark spots in the base colour, softened by ticking. The ticking must be present but not so pronounced that it obscures the spotting. Silver varieties are not permitted.

=== Behaviour ===
The breed is described as active, energetic, playful, and affectionate, whilst also displaying a marked degree of independence. Owing to its recent wild ancestry, it retains certain behavioural traits associated with wildcats and is regarded as an excellent hunter.

== Legal restrictions ==
In the Netherlands and Belgium (Flanders and Brussels) it is illegal to own or breed African wildcats, as well as their F1–F4 generation hybrid Kanaani offspring.
