= F1 hybrid =

First-generation hybrid (or crossbreed) animal or plant

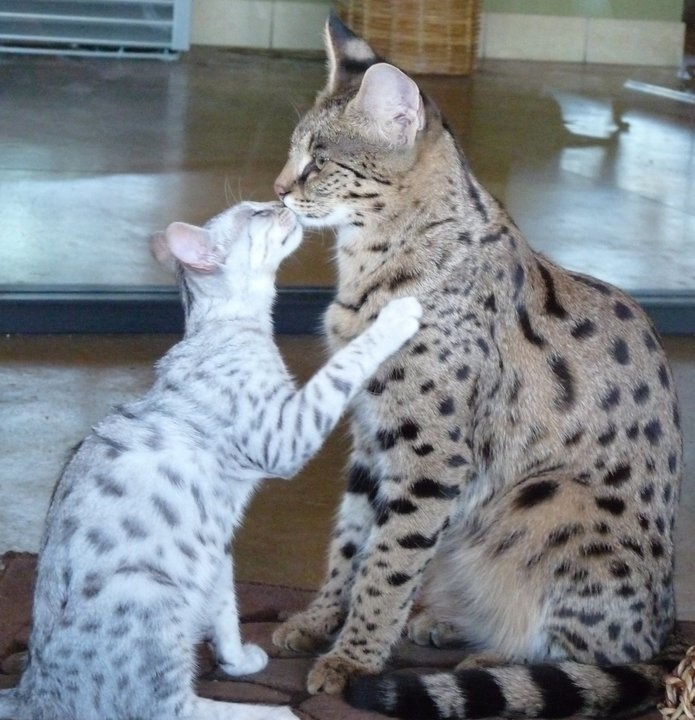
Two savannah cats, a hybrid between the domestic cat (Felis catus) and the serval (Leptailurus serval). The larger of the two is an F1 hybrid, while the smaller is an F4 hybrid.

F1 hybrid (also known as filial 1 hybrid) is the first filial generation of offspring of distinctly different parental types. F1 hybrids are used in genetics, and in selective breeding, where the term F1 crossbreed may be used. The term is sometimes written with a subscript, as F_{1} hybrid. Subsequent generations are called F_{2}, F_{3}, etc.

The offspring of distinctly different parental types produce a new, uniform phenotype with a combination of characteristics from the parents. In fish breeding, those parents frequently are two closely related fish species; however, in plant and animal breeding, the parents often are two inbred lines.

Gregor Mendel focused on patterns of inheritance and the genetic basis for variation. In his cross-pollination experiments involving two true-breeding, or homozygous, parents, Mendel found that the resulting F1 generation was heterozygous and consistent. The offspring showed a combination of the phenotypes from each parent that were genetically dominant. Mendel's discoveries involving the F1 and F2 generations laid the foundation for modern genetics.

== Production of F1 hybrids ==
=== In plants ===
Crossing two genetically different plants produces a hybrid seed. This can happen naturally, and includes hybrids between species (for example, peppermint is a sterile F1 hybrid of watermint and spearmint). In agronomy, the term F1 hybrid is usually reserved for agricultural cultivars derived from two-parent cultivars. These F1 hybrids are usually created by means of controlled pollination, sometimes by hand pollination. For annual plants such as tomato and maize, F1 hybrids must be produced each season.

For mass production of F1 hybrids with uniform phenotype, the parent plants must have predictable genetic effects on the offspring. Inbreeding and selection for uniformity for multiple generations ensures that the parent lines are almost homozygous. The divergence between the (two) parent lines promotes improved growth and yield characteristics in offspring through the phenomenon of heterosis ("hybrid vigour" or "combining ability").

Two populations of breeding stock with desired characteristics are subjected to inbreeding until the homozygosity of the population exceeds a certain level, usually 90% or more. Typically, this requires more than 10 generations. Thereafter, the two strains must be crossed, while avoiding self-fertilization. Normally, this is done with plants by deactivating or removing male flowers from one population, taking advantage of time differences between male and female flowering, or hand pollinating.

In 1960, 99% of all corn, 95% of sugar beet, 80% of spinach, 80% of sunflowers, 62% of broccoli, and 60% of onions planted in the United States were F1 hybrids. Beans and peas are not commercially hybridized because they are automatic pollinators, and hand pollination is prohibitively expensive.

==== F2 hybrids ====
F2 hybrids, the result of self or cross-pollination of F1s, lack the consistency of F1s, though they may retain some desirable traits and can be produced more cheaply because hand pollination or other interventions are not required. Some seed companies offer F2 seed at less cost, particularly in bedding plants, where consistency is less critical.

=== In animals ===
F1 crosses in animals can be between two inbred lines or between two closely related species or subspecies. In fish such as cichlids, the term F1 cross is used for crosses between two different wild-caught individuals that are assumed to be from different genetic lines.

Mules are F1 hybrids between horses (mares) and donkeys (jacks); the opposite sex cross results in hinnies. However, such offspring are almost always sterile.

Today, certain domesticated–wild hybrid breeds, such as the Bengal cat and the Savannah cat, are classified by their filial generation number. An F1 hybrid Savannah cat is the result of reproduction between an African Serval cat and a domestic cat.

As explained in the International Journal of Fauna and Biological Studies, there are four reasons for species hybridizations:

1. Small population size
2. Habitat fragmentation and species introduction
3. Anthropogenic hybridization
4. Visual, chemical, and acoustic interferences

Small population size can be caused by inadequate or obliterated natural habitats that lead to species escaping to other habitats and as a result, this may lead to lesser mate availability and can cause breeding between distinct species. Habitat fragmentation and species introduction can be man-made or caused by mother nature such as deforestation, desertification, eutrophication, urbanization, water oil extraction causing changes in the ecosystem that leads to animal migration or evading new surroundings. Third, is anthropogenic hybridization, which is "artificial or human-led hybridization" is supported for researchers to study "reproductive compatibility between species". Lastly, visual, chemical, and acoustic interferences cues are what causes species to signal sexual cues by differentiating between the same and opposite-sex leading to hybridization.

== Advantages ==
- Homogeneity and predictability: The genes of an individual plant or animal F1 offspring of homozygous pure lines display limited variation, making their phenotype uniform, so attractive for mechanical operations and easing fine population management. Once the characteristics of the cross are known, repeating this cross yields the same result.
- Higher performance: As most alleles code for different versions of a protein or enzyme, having two different versions of this allele amounts to having two different versions of the enzyme. This increases the likelihood of an optimal version of the enzyme being present and reduces the likelihood of a genetic defect.

The advantages of species hybridization are 1.) evolution of new interspecific breed, 2.) hybrid vigour, and 3.) enhanced longevity and immunity to diseases (Dubey, A. 2019). Dubey explains each as follows: 1.) A new interspecific breed is due to the mating of two distinguished species. 2.) Hybrid vigour is defined as a species becoming sturdier, more dynamic, and stronger than the parents. Lastly, 3.) Hybrids can have improved longevity and are "highly immune to diseases" (Dubey, A. 2019).

== Disadvantages ==
- The main advantage of F1 hybrids in agriculture is also their drawback. When F1 cultivars are used as parents, their offspring (F2 generation) vary greatly from one another. Some F2s are high in homozygous genes, as found in their grandparents, and these will lack hybrid vigour. From the point of view of a commercial seed producer who does not wish customers to produce their own seed via seed saving, this genetic assortment is the desired characteristic.
- Both inbreeding and crossing the ancestral lines of the hybrid are costly, because of the time and number of generations involved, which translates into a much higher price. Not all crop species exhibit a sufficiently high heterosis effect to offset this disadvantage.
- F1 hybrids mature at the same time when raised under the same environmental conditions. They all ripen simultaneously and can be more easily harvested by machine. Traditional cultivars and landraces are often more useful to gardeners because they crop over a longer period of time, avoiding gluts or food shortages.

In contrast, the limitations can be due to genetic extinction and/or outbreeding depression. Dubey explains that genetic extinction can be caused by "hybrid swarms" noting the various degrees of hybrids. Outbreeding depression is the "cross between genetically distant populations" causing hybrids to reduce fit and isolation leading to reduced reproduction.

== See also ==
- Backcrossing
- Heterosis ("hybrid vigour")
- Heirloom plant
