= York Chocolate =

- Other names: York
- Common nicknames: Il Gatto Cioccolato
- Origin: United States
- Foundation bloodstock: Chocolate domestic longhair cats

Breed standards
- WCF: standard
- FFE: standard
- CCA-AFC: standard
- CFF: standard
- LOOF: standard
- Other: IYCF breed club standard

Notes
- Likely extinct or in critically low numbers

The York Chocolate is a rare pedigreed breed of domestic cat originating in the United States. It has a long, fluffy coat and a tapered tail. The coat is predominantly or completely solid chocolate, or its dilute form, known as solid lilac. The breed was named after the US-state of New York, where it was established in 1983. This breed was created by selectively breeding domestic long-haired cats of non-pedigree ancestry. The breed is not widely recognised by the major cat registries, except for the WCF. As of 2026, the breed is either in critically low numbers, or extinct.

== History ==
The York Chocolate originated from the selective breeding of random-bred domestic long-haired cats in the United States. The foundation cat, a female known as Brownie, was born in 1983 on Janet Chiefari’s goat dairy farm in Grafton, US. Her dam was a black-and-white bicolour long-haired domestic, and her sire a solid black long-haired domestic.

Upon noticing similarities in coat and body types, Chiefari began her own breeding programme. In 1985, Brownie was mated back to her half-brother and son, producing chocolate-coloured kittens, establishing the basis of the breed. The dilute form of chocolate, lilac, first appeared in 1990; this variety was described as a rich, warm cocoa tone. The breed was developed in those two colour varieties: solid chocolate and solid lilac, recognised with or without white spotting. Kittens were typically born in a lighter cocoa or chocolate shade, with the coat deepening in colour as they matured, reaching full development at approximately 12 to 18 months of age.

== Breed registration ==
In March 1990, the Cat Fanciers' Federation (CFF) of the New England area in the USA recognised York Chocolates as an "experimental" cat breed, and allegedly gave it championship status within the group in March 1992. They published a breed standard in May 1993. It was supposedly granted champion status by the Canadian Cat Association (CCA) in March 1995, as well, but while the CCA published a breed standard in 1995, as of March 2013, the organisation no longer advertises it, and it includes outdated wording. Since 2020 this CCA breed standard is labelled as "dormant".

The breed was recognised in August 2002 by the World Cat Federation (WCF) based in Germany, and with some differences from previously published standards, most of which seem to be lost. Apart from the WCF, the breed is not recognised by any of the other major international cat fancier organisations as of 2026.

As "Il Gatto Cioccolato" it found favour in Italy and the International York Chocolate Federation (IYCF) was founded there in 2003, but seems to have been dormant since 2004. The IYCF claimed affiliation with the German Feline Federation Europe (FFE)/Bavarian Cat Fanciers' Association (BCFA), which published a standard (minus colour information) in 2004. It also claimed affiliation with the Russian World Felinological Federation (WFF), although the latter does not recognise the York Chocolate as a breed.

=== Popularity ===
In 2005, there were approximately 60 York Chocolates in existence. The last York Chocolate kitten in France was born in 2010, with a total of just 10 kittens born in the country between 2005 and 2010. There are no records of the breed in the WCF Best Cat database, meaning that they have not been participating in any of their worldwide cat shows since the 2010s. In 2016, the last remaining breeder of York Chocolates (Debbie Reber) ended her breeding programme.

As of 2026, it is unknown if there are still unaltered York Chocolate cats alive. If the breed still exists today, it must be in critically small numbers.

== Characteristics ==
=== Appearance ===
The breed is of medium to large size, with an elongated body, substantial bone structure and firm musculature. The rib cage and shoulders are not broader than the hips. The legs are long and slender, with the hind legs slightly higher than the forelegs; the paws are oval in shape, with tufts between the toes. The tail is medium to long, broad at the base and tapering slightly to a rounded tip, and is fully furnished with flowing hair. The neck is medium to long in length.

The head is medium in size but appears relatively small in proportion to the body. It forms a modified wedge, extending in straight lines from the nose to the tips of the ears. The forehead is slightly rounded. The nose is long, straight and evenly medium broad, with a slight indentation at eye level. The muzzle is elongated and well defined, with a smooth contour, though it may appear somewhat square due to pronounced whisker pads. The chin is firm, gently contoured, and aligned vertically with the nose and upper lip.

The ears are large, moderately pointed, broad at the base, slightly flared and tilted forward, with well-furnished inner ear tufts. They are set wide apart, with at least one ear’s width between them, and continue the wedge-shaped lines of the head. The eyes are medium-sized, oval, and set at a slight slant towards the nose in harmony with the head shape. The distance between the eyes is at least one eye width. Eye colour ranges from golden and hazelnut to green, with preference given to purer and deeper shades.

The coat is semi-long, fine and glossy, lying smoothly along the body. It has a soft, silky texture with a well-developed undercoat that is not woolly. The fur is shorter on the shoulders and gradually lengthens towards the back; a slight frill is desirable.

Recognised colour varieties include chocolate and lilac, as well as their bicolours (chocolate and lilac with white). In solid-coloured cats, the coat should be evenly coloured to the roots across the entire body, without shading, rusting, white brindling, or tabby markings in adults. Ghost markings are permitted in kittens up to ten months of age. A white medallion (locket) or a white patch on the belly in solid-coloured cats constitutes a fault.

== See also ==
- Chantilly-Tiffany
- Havana Brown
