= Sokoke =

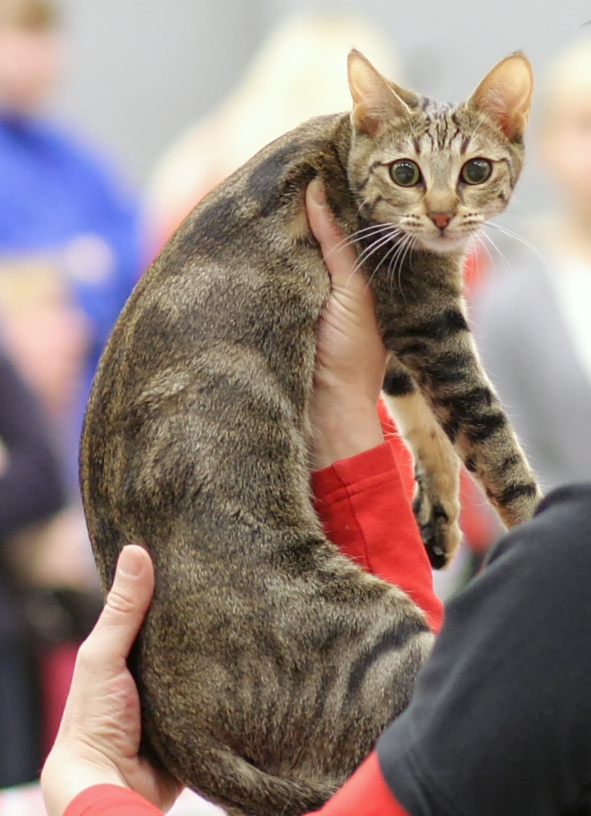
- Adult showing the breed's characteristic black blotched tabby pattern
- Other names: Sokoke Forest Cat, African Shorthair (standardised breed); khadzonzo or kadzonzo (original landrace)
- Origin: Kenya, Denmark
- Foundation bloodstock: Kenian landrace cats

Breed standards
- FIFe: standard
- CCA-AFC: standard
- GCCF: standard
- LOOF: standard

The Sokoke (or Sokoke Forest Cat in long form, and formerly the African Shorthair) is a natural breed of domestic cat, developed and standardised, beginning in the late 1970s, from the feral khadzonzo landrace of eastern, coastal Kenya. The Sokoke is recognised by several major cat pedigree registry organisations as a standardised cat breed. It is named after the Arabuko Sokoke National Park, the environment from which the foundation stock was obtained, for breed development primarily in Kenya and Denmark. The cat is long-legged, with short, coarse hair, and typically a blotched tabby coat, though specific lineages have produced different appearances. Although once rumoured to be a domestic × wildcat hybrid, genetic study has not borne out this belief. Another idea, that the variety is unusually ancient, remains unproven either way. The native khadzonzo population is closely related to an island-dwelling group, the Lamu cat, further north.

== Original khadzonzo landrace ==
Coastal Kenya's distinctive, free-roaming, feral cats – known as khadzonzo or kadzonzo, and found from city streets to the Arabuko Sokoke National Park – were "discovered", in the Western cat fancy sense, by horse breeder and wildlife artist Jeni Slater in 1978 near the Kenyan Watamu coconut plantation, though of course the cats were known for much longer by native people. By that point, the rural population were thought to be nearly extinct due to human encroachment on the forest and its resources. Although there were ideas that it might be a new subspecies of wildcat, the tameness of the kittens Slater reared suggested that theoretical hybridisation with wildcats was unlikely, as did features like the long, tapered tail (not characteristic of any wild African species), a general form consistent with Asian domestic cat breeds (very unlike the cobby figure of wildcats), and the mottled, blotched coat pattern (a characteristic of urban cat populations). The feral khadzonzo were developed into a standardised breed, the Sokoke, which has a much more uniform appearance than the landrace cats.

=== Description ===
The forest population tend to consistently "breed true" for ticked coats in brown tones with prominent mottling with large rosette spots, which may fuse. They share this general feature with many other forest-dwelling felids, a natural form of camouflage. Aside from specific patterns, the cats in this population do not seem to vary widely in appearance. The town-dwelling population (presumably through crossbreeding with non-native cats) come in a wider variety of colours and patterns, including white-spotted coats, and some that are mostly black. The urban variety are very similar to an island population a few hundred kilometres north, the subject of a book called The Cats of Lamu by Jack Couffer. (Note: 1998, Lyons Press) All of these populations are characterised by narrow faces compared to other African domestic cats, as well as long ears, long legs, and a lean, not cobby, body.

=== Relation to other populations ===
Couffer hypothesises that, due to their isolation and Lamu's ancient history as a trade centre between Africa and Asia, they may be more closely related than even the Egyptian Mau breed to the original cats domesticated in the Fertile Crescent over 4,000 years ago and holding special favour in Ancient Egypt.

While modern genetic work has yet to prove or disprove Couffer's idea, a DNA study by the US National Cancer Institute has determined that the spotted khadzonzo street cats of eastern Kenya, the cats of the Lamu Archipelago off the Kenyan coast, and the standardised Sokoke are all closely related. CGP categorised them in its "Arabian Sea Racial Group" (among a total of 12 feline "race" groupings). The group's shared DNA is derived primarily from Asian domestic cats, with ancient Arabian wildcat progenitors. This dispels the suspicion of some breeders that the cats are at least part modern wildcat – they are no more wild than the rest of the domestic cats. Advances in DNA sequencing have now resulted in an ambitious whole-body sequencing effort, (Note: For example, the 99 Cat Genome Project.) which may reveal much more about the origins of the khadzonzo and connections that it and the Sokoke has with other cat populations.

=== Status ===
The Lamu population are under pressure from a sterilisation campaign championed by recent immigrants, while the forest population have become rare for unclear reasons, and more secretive. Eight specimens (only two female) were captured for breeding from the forest in 2001; photographs show that several have very large dark blotches, somewhat reminiscent of the unrelated clouded leopard species (a trait now available in recent bloodlines of the pet breed), but share both tall ears and long body with the already-established formal breed. As with most native landrace populations of cats, these must be under threat of genetic erosion from modern cats introduced, and allowed to roam and interbreed, by foreign settlers to the area. For example, the Manx cat is nearly extinct in its homeland, the Isle of Man, being bred out by the imported cats of British and other immigrants, though the standardised form developed from the landrace is common and popular around the world. Similar threats to the Van cat have impelled the Turkish government to hastily set up an official breeding programme to save it in a more pure form than the weakly related Turkish Van and Turkish Angora standardised breeds which bear little resemblance to the landrace feral populations of Van city and the Lake Van area.

== Sokoke breed ==
=== History ===
The Sokoke is a "natural breed", i.e., one developed and standardised from the local, free-breeding landrace population, and thus distinct from it by virtue of careful selective breeding for specific, fixed traits believed to epitomise the distinctions evolved by natural selection in the original population. As British cat geneticist and pedigree judge Pat Turner wrote in 1993, in the early days of recognition of the breed's standardisation, the fixing of traits like large "wild-looking" spots that are distinct from other blotched breeds "can only be done by selective breeding".

The breeding programme was begun in 1978 by Jeni Slater, who originally named the breed the African Shorthair. She used cats found in and around Watamu, both raised from kittenhood and enticed from the adult feral population with food rewards.

Gloria Moeldrop, a friend of Slater's, brought a pair of Slater's cats home with her to Denmark to breed in 1983, because Slater feared for the survival of the native cat in Kenya. The cats were first shown in Copenhagen in 1984, then in Odense. Slater introduced a darker Watamu street cat specimen into the breeding programme, in 1987, for genetic diversity. Breeder and North American Sokoke Association officer Pat Longley has suggested that this cat introduced the tabby (US: lynx) point pattern seen in some Sokokes. In 1989, Moeldrop imported more cats from Kenya to strengthen her European breeding stock. Slater also provided at least one to a breeder named Bob Schwartz, in Italy.

Jeannie Knocker, an Englishwoman residing near Slater in Kenya, gathered several feral cats near the borders of the forest and kept them penned, producing litters that were exported to the US and Europe, registered to establish future pedigrees, and bred; these became known as the "new line" Sokoke cats, with distinctive features from those of the Slater-developed "old line". The cats caught in the forest from 2001 onward have been added to this breeding programme, as have some more recent specimens.

Whether extraneous (e.g., European or Asian) bloodlines were introduced by any breeders is unclear. Genetic research has proven that some cats of the Sokoke breed are closely related to the feral African population.

== Breed recognition ==
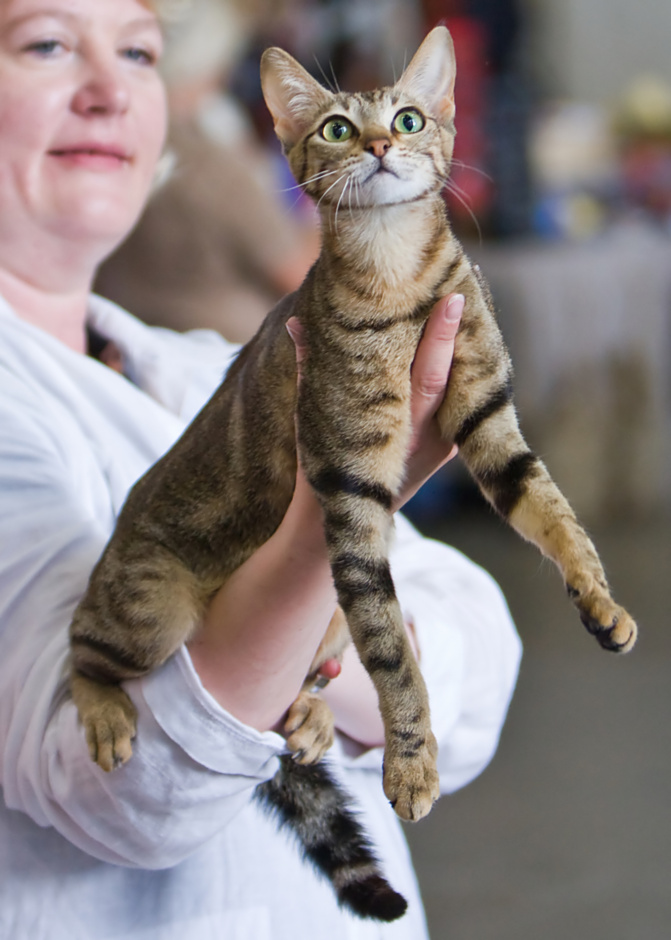
Adult contestant at a cat show

The standardised breed was first recognised by a breed registry, the Fédération Internationale Féline (FIFe), under the name Sokoke, after the forest. This occurred in 1993, after a multi-breeder demonstration of the new breed's consistent development at a cat show in Denmark.

The breed is also registered by The International Cat Association (TICA), based in the United States; it is eligible to be shown in the "Preliminary New Breed" class at TICA-sanctioned events.

The Sokoke is now also recognised by two national cat registries, the UK Governing Council of the Cat Fancy (GCCF), and the Canadian Cat Association (CCA).

=== Popularity ===
The is one of the rarest cat breeds. In the 2024 statistics of FIFe, one of the major global cat registries, the breed ranked as the least popular cat breed, with null registered Sokoke kittens that year.

== Characteristics ==
=== Appearance ===
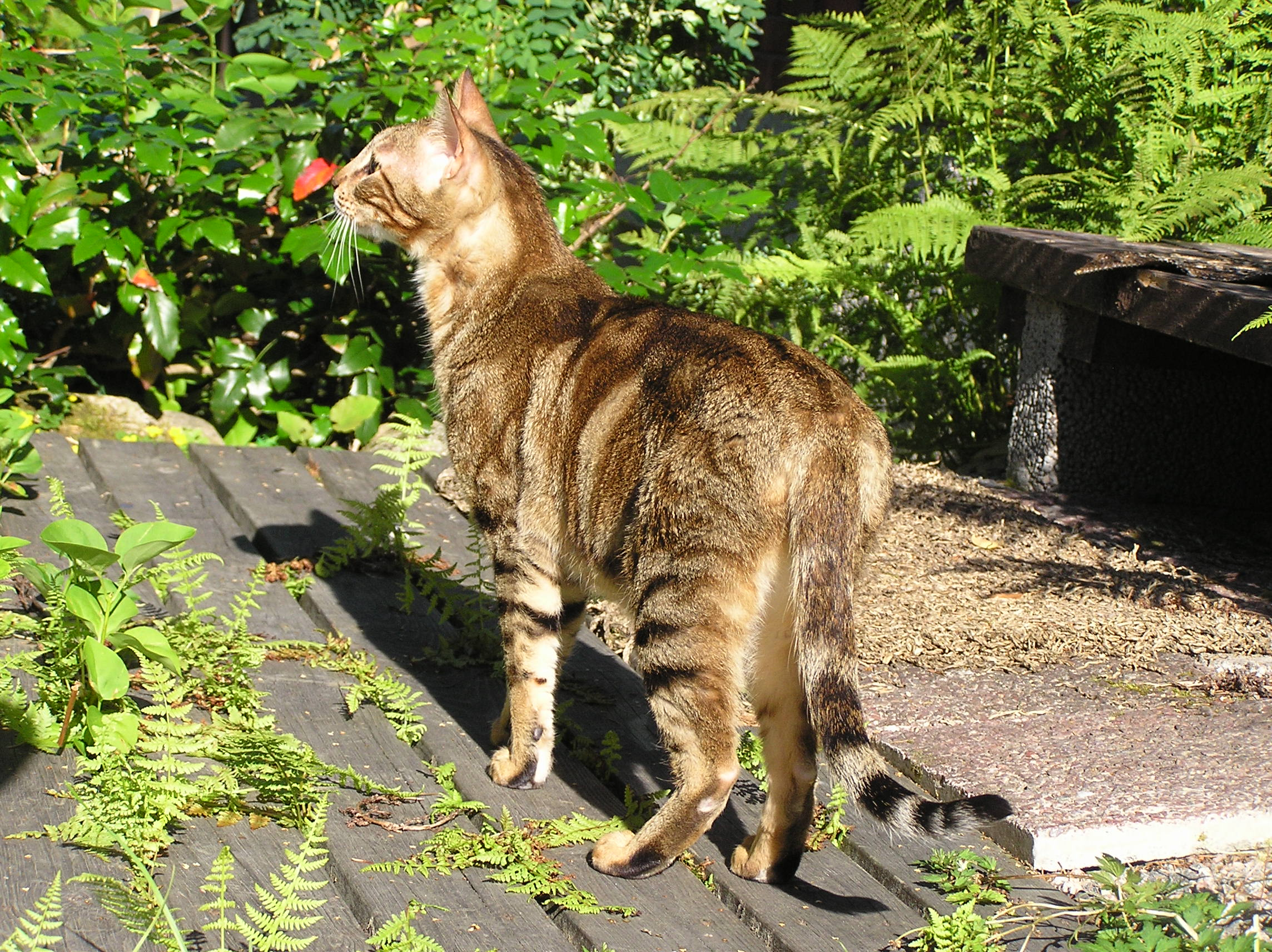
Neutered male

The bodies of the Sokokes are medium-sized overall, long and thin, with long legs. The back legs are longer than the front legs, similar to those of a wildcat. They also have a unique tip-toe gait, in part due to a straighter stifle as well as the longer back legs. Their eyes are usually amber to light-green, set in a comparatively small head, with long ears, reminiscent of various species of wild cat, though these are traits intentionally reinforced by artificial selection. The tail is tapered.

==== Coat ====
Sokokes typically have blotched (also known as classic; i.e., marbled large-spotted) tabby coats in shades of black to brown, broadly similar to those of the Bengal and Ocicat. The centres or "oysters" of the patterns are hollow-looking due to the agouti gene, which also produces a "cold-ticking" or "salt and pepper" look to the coat, overall. This combination has been called "African tabby" or "African pattern", which may extend all the way to the tip of the tail. It is distinct from previously known blotched tabby patterns found in other breeds in this respect, but otherwise genetically identical, with all the normal tabby features (in cat fancier and judging terms, the patterns share the same ""butterflies" "eyeliner", "bonnet strings", "necklaces" and other characteristic markings). A particular "wood-grain" look is highly prized in show cats.

Their coats are short, and coarse but lustrous, with little to no undercoat. Recessive colours and traits are rare. Noted so far (and not accepted for showing by most registries) are black (i.e. "seal") tabby (US: lynx) point (accepted for showing in GCCF), melanistic (black or near-black), and "blue" (i.e. grey) colours. Long-haired specimens are almost unknown. "Chaotic", "chained", and "clouded" marbling patterns have been seen with the advent of the "new line", as deviations away from the earlier established modified blotched tabby pattern, but clearly based on the genetics of the landrace forest specimens from the 1990s. Perhaps owing to the admixture of city specimens, the original Slater lineage also fairly often produces small-spotted instead of blotched cats, perhaps indicating earlier crossbreeding with non-native cats (the Egyptian Mau, for example, has such a pattern).

=== Behaviour ===
Sokoke cats are very active and enjoy climbing. They tend to be vocal toward human keepers and other cats with whom they live. They bond deeply to each other, as well as their owners. This trait makes re-homing harder for them, with a longer adjustment period expected in adult cats and older, already-bonded kittens.

The Sokoke does best in a controlled environment, because of their limited resistance to common New World cat illnesses, often found in catteries and multi-cat homes. Like all of the short-haired Asian group of cats, they do not thrive in extreme cold temperatures for extended periods of time. However, contrary to previous reports, they can be acclimated to colder climates, and do not require special housing any more than similar short-haired, Asian-group cats.

Their expected lifespan is the same as any purebred domestic cat, with 15 years an average old age.
