= Havana Brown =

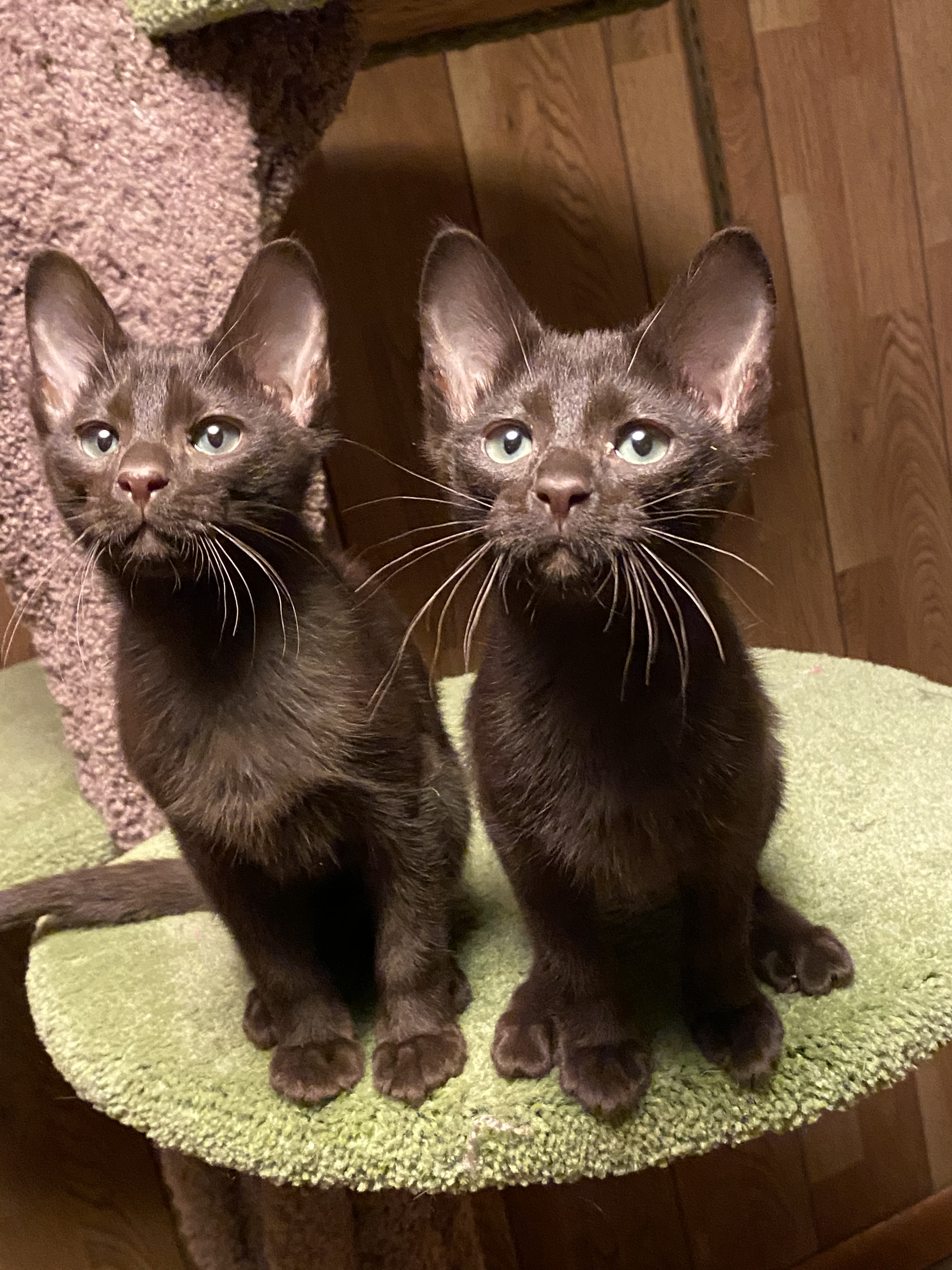
- Havana kittens
- Other names: HB, Havana, Chestnut Brown (Oriental)
- Origin: United Kingdom

Breed standards
- CFA: standard
- TICA: standard
- ACFA/CAA: standard
- CCA-AFC: standard
- Other: AACE

Notes
- A phenotypically similar cat is recognised by the GCCF as the Suffolk Chocolate. The Suffolk is not the same as the Havana Brown within the registers of CFA, TICA, ACFA and LOOF. The standard for the Suffolk breed is different from the Havana Brown, and the cats used for outcross to develop the recently created breed are different from those found in the Havana Brown. The Suffolk Chocolate is not allowed in the breeding lines of the Havana Brown in any of the registries.

The Havana Brown is a pedigreed domestic cat breed with a solid chocolate short-haired coat. The breed resulted from a planned breeding between chocolate-carrying Siamese and domestic shorthair black cats, by a group of British cat fanciers in the 1950s.

The term Havana Brown is used by cat pedigree registries to refer to cats of two different body type; a more extreme Oriental-type (solid chocolate Oriental Shorthair) and a more moderate USA-type, specifically in North America.

== History ==
=== Etymology ===
The most likely explanation of the breed's name - and the one most shared by Havana Brown devotees - is that its coat colour is very similar to that of the Havana cigars, however, some have also argued that the breed's name is also derived from the Havana (rabbit) which also shares the colour. This is likely more accurate based on the recorded history in the UK.

=== Swiss Mountain Cat ===
It has been documented that self-brown cats were shown in Europe in the 1890s, one name given to these was the Swiss Mountain Cat. These disappeared until post–World War II, with the most likely explanation that the British Siamese Cat Club discouraged their breeding. The Swiss Mountain Cat was never used in the breeding programs of the modern Havana Brown. However, they likely share genetics inherited from the Siamese.

=== Breed development ===
In the early 1950s a group of British cat fanciers began working together with an intent to create a self brown cat of Foreign Type. They called themselves "The Havana Group", later to become "The Chestnut Brown Group". This group of breeders created the foundation of the Havana Brown cat of today. The ladies credited with this effort include Mrs. Armitage Hargreaves of Laurentide Cattery, Mrs. Munroe-Smith of Elmtower Cattery, the Baroness Von Ullmann of Roofspringer Cattery, Mrs. Elsie Fisher of Praha Cattery, and Mrs. Judd of Crossways Cattery. These breeders, by selectively breeding a Siamese cat which carried the chocolate gene to a black cat that also carried the chocolate gene, were able to produce chestnut (chocolate) coloured kittens.

Early breeders introduced an Oriental Siamese type Russian Blue into their breeding. However, using current genetic testing, it is believed that almost none remain in the gene pool.

==== Oriental-type ====
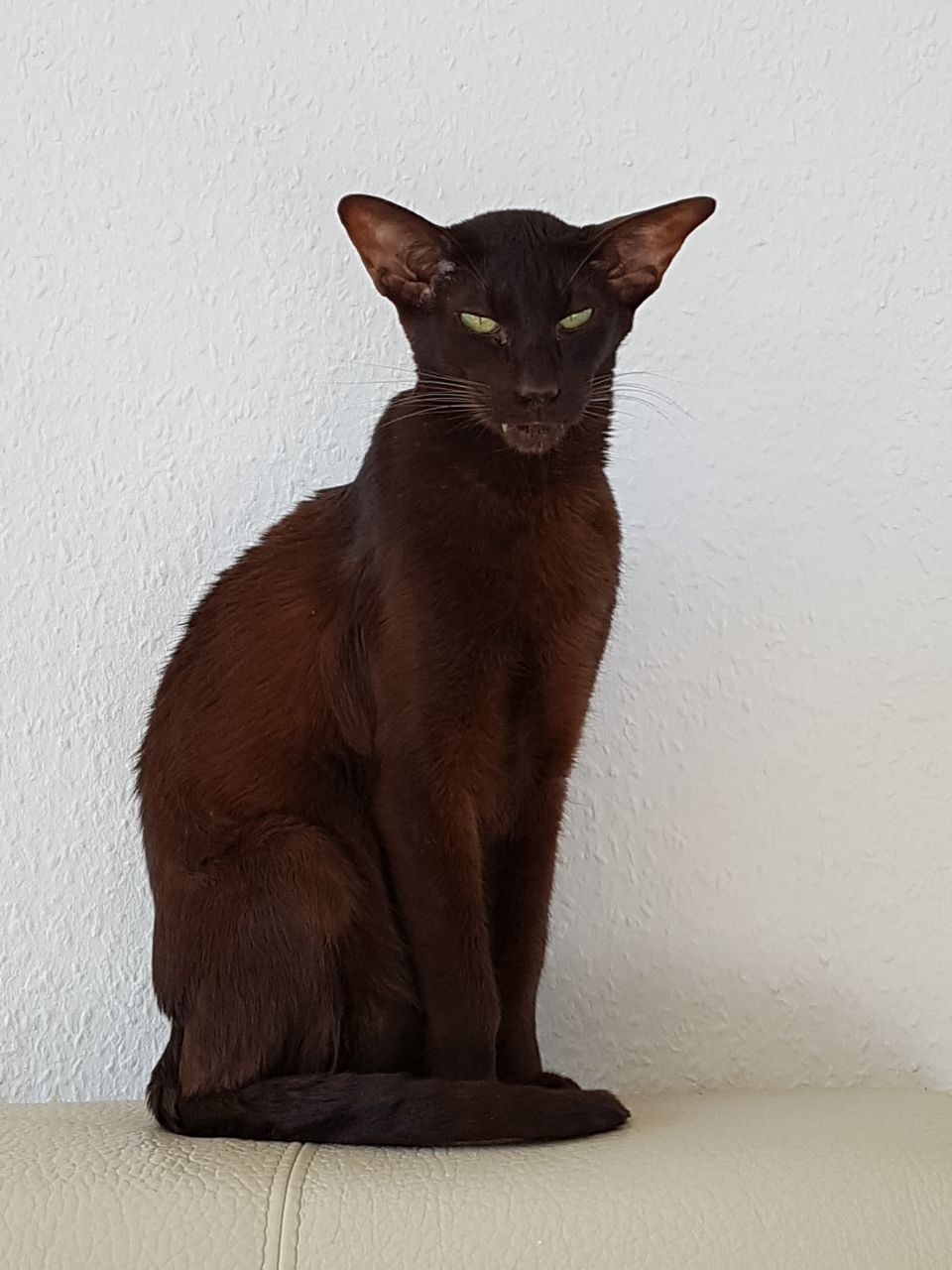
Oriental-type adult

The breed continued to develop in the UK and became known as the Chestnut Brown Oriental and retained the Siamese conformation. Early in the breeding program, two kittens were also exported to Siamese breeders in the USA. Over the next decade, breeding took a different turn as genetic problems began to plague the new breed. It became necessary to utilise other breeds for genetic outcross and the phenotype began to evolve and develop into a different look than what the original breeders in England had intended. This change in direction tore apart the breeding group and caused many difficulties in continuing to progress the breed within the Governing Council of the Cat Fancy (GCCF). Soon, the Chestnut Brown cat was being produced in many colours, known just as Oriental with a numeric system to designate the coat colour.

==== USA-type ====
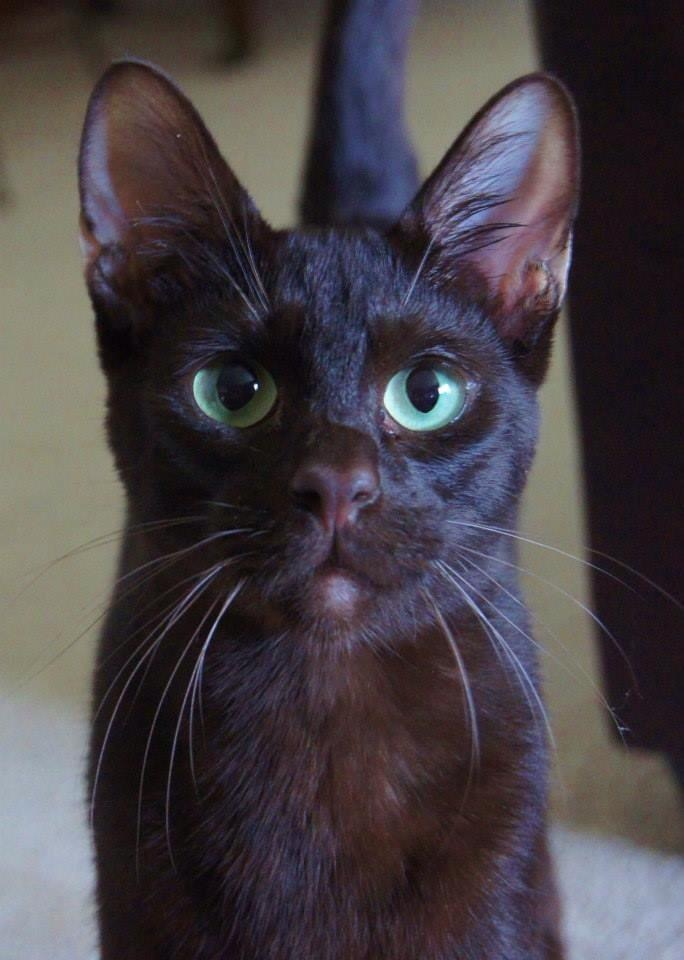
USA-type adult. Havana Brown whiskers are brown.

In the US, the imported kittens continued to be crossbred with the chocolate and seal point Siamese, producing only chocolate or pointed offspring, with the breeders selectively breeding for only self brown kittens. Genetic diversity quickly resolved any defects that were seen in the early imports. The breeders in the US desired to maintain the look of the cats that were imported and bred specifically for brown offspring. Thus, the cats in the US have a different look than the cats being bred in Europe. The US breeders focused on maintaining the unique head shape and did not breed for extremes. This US-bred version is moderate in every way, with a rich, warm mahogany colour that consistently produced like offspring. The breed has been recognised for competition in the US since the late 1950s. In 1964, the Havana Brown was accepted for Championship status in the world's largest feline registry, the Cat Fanciers' Association (CFA).

==== Suffolk ====
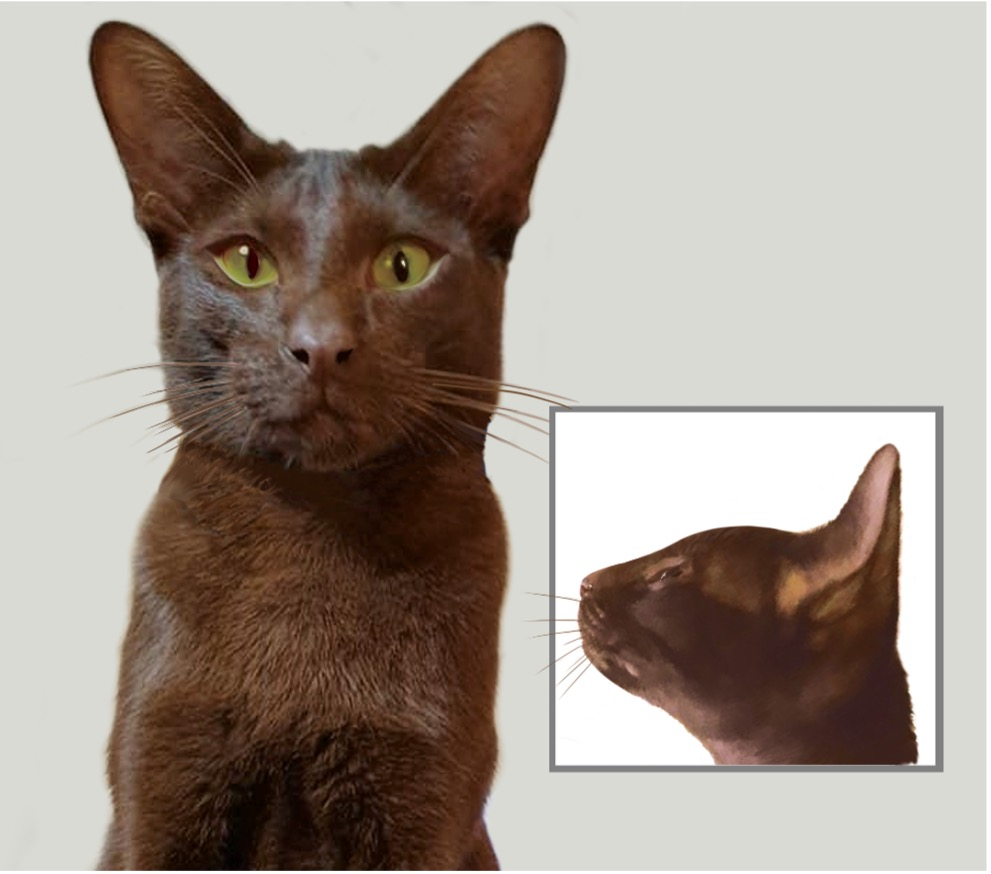
Front and side view of the ideal Suffolk cat

Early this century, a group of breeders in England again began trying to recreate the vision of the early Havana breeders. They made good progress in isolating the chocolate genetics and were consistently producing chocolate, lilac and pointed kittens. In 2011 a registered Havana Brown was imported from Europe and bred back to their Havana Orientals. This cat's contribution, along with selective breeding for type, began to direct the look of some English Havanas away from its Oriental siblings, and moved them more in the direction of the USA-type Havana Brown. In June 2014 under the breed name Suffolk, this cat gained recognition by the GCCF. The alternative name was used because the GCCF uses the name Havana to refer to a self chocolate Oriental Shorthair, from which they wished to be distinguished. Although a USA-type Havana Brown is used in the breeding program of the Suffolk, they are not to be confused as the same breed. The Suffolk is much closer to the Chestnut/Havana Oriental than to the USA-type Havana Brown.

=== Popularity ===
The USA-type Havana Brown has been considered an endangered breed, since the breeding pool is very small. As of 2024, there were only 15 USA-type catteries registered in the world with the majority of those (12) in North America.

== Characteristics ==
=== Appearance ===
The Havana Brown is a well balanced, moderately sized, muscular short-haired cat with a body of average length. Sterilised animals can tend to become larger and somewhat chubby. They are a moderately active breed, compared to other short-hair cat breeds. The coat colour must be warm brown, typically reddish-brown, with no obvious tabby markings (note that kittens will always show markings but they resolve as the cat ages and dissolve completely by one year). Whiskers must also be brown and the eye colour green. The head should be slightly longer than wide, but should never appear like a wedge. In profile, the nose/muzzle should have a distinct stop and change in direction at the eyes. Paw pads must be pink or rose coloured but should never be black. Ears tend to be moderately large. A Havana Brown should have no extreme features; specimens should be attractive and moderate. Males tend to be larger than females and are average in weight compared with other breeds.

The Havana Brown is an intelligent cat that often uses its paws both to examine objects and to communicate with its owners. Curiosity brings them to the door as visitors arrive rather than preferring to be hidden as many cats will do. It is not unheard of for a Havana Brown to place paws on someone's thigh and offer a meow of introduction. It is playful and curious, but rarely destructive unless left without companionship. While many are 'lap cats', a few are more content just to sit quietly beside their human companions. On the other hand, many Havana Browns prefer to ride on the shoulders of their human and help with daily activities. They love to play in and groom hair - it happens so frequently that there are Havana Brown owners who don't even notice their cat doing it until it is pointed out by an observer. It is an odd trait that most Havana Browns share.

=== Behaviour ===
Havana Browns become very attached to their family and do not thrive when left alone for long periods. They are curious and interactive and need to be a part of daily activities. It is common for the Havana Brown to become best companions with the family dog. Many owners also find it surprising how easily they can travel with their Havana Brown without the cat's objection.

== Health ==
Very little grooming is required. A gentle brushing and wipe with a damp cloth once or twice a week, along with a good quality diet, will suffice for Havana Browns.

There are no known genetic diseases associated with this breed. They may have a slightly higher occurrence of gingivitis than other breeds, this being attributed to their Siamese ancestry.
