= Canadian Cat Association =

Canadian non-profit organization

- Abbreviation: CCA-AFC
- Formation: 1960
- Type: Cat registry
- Purpose: Maintain a pedigreed cat registry, sanction cat shows, and promote responsible cat ownership
- Region served: Canada
- Members: Optional
- Official language: English, French
- Website: www.cca-afc.com

The Canadian Cat Association (French: Association Féline Canadienne, CCA-AFC) is a non-profit organization in Canada whose mission is to promote the welfare of all cats in Canada, maintain a registry of pedigreed cats in Canada, and further the improvement of all breeds of cats in Canada. CCA-AFC is Canada's only globally-recognized national cat registry, with its pedigrees and registrations accepted by major global associations such as the Cat Fanciers' Association, The International Cat Association, and Fédération Internationale Féline. To date, CCA-AFC has registered over 190,000 cats.

== History ==
In 1960, a small group of Canadians gathered to explore the possibility of forming a Canadian registry for pedigreed felines. Before this event, all registrations had to be filed in the United States or Europe and all cat shows held in Canada were held under the rules of American associations.

By the following year, enough support was gathered from members of the Canadian cat fancy to go into business and registrations were entered in a Canadian studbook for the first time. Soon after, clubs were formed under CCA and with the publication of show rules, championship shows followed.

Unlike other associations at the time, CCA-AFC maintained active memberships, and changes to the by-laws and show rules had to approved by the membership. To this day, CCA-AFC maintains this membership-based structure, with an Annual General Meeting held in the spring to further the goals of the Association.

== Services ==
The Canadian Cat Association's primary goal is to promote responsible pet ownership and development of pedigreed cats in Canada. CCA-AFC's primary services to its members include maintaining an accurate registry of pedigreed cats, sanctioning cat shows (including licensing affiliate clubs, recording titles, and scoring the All Canadian Awards), setting breed standards, and training judges and clerks. CCA-AFC judges are respected globally and have guest judged for CFA, ACFA, LOOF, and WCF. CCA-AFC cat shows run across Canada, although most members reside in Ontario and Quebec.

For the public, CCA-AFC offers breeder referral, public education, and information booths at shows.

== Show system and scoring ==
CCA-AFC shows follow the typical North American format with cats and exhibitors benched centrally, with between 4 and 6 judging rings set up around the outside. Cat shows take place over one to three days (typically two) and cats must remain in the show hall from the start of the show in the morning until the end of that day's judging (usually late afternoon). CCA-AFC shows have four classes:

- Kitten (for pedigreed cats aged 4 to 8 months)
- Championship (for pedigreed breeding cats over 8 months old)
- Premiership / Alters (for spayed or neutered pedigreed cats over 8 months old)
- Household Pet / Companion (for non-pedigreed cats over 8 months old)

Each class is divided into two divisions, Longhair and Shorthair, based on coat length. Each cat eligible to compete must not be declawed, as CCA-AFC stands against this procedure on the grounds of animal welfare. Cats are evaluated based on their adherence to the breed standard (in the case of pedigreed cats) and their general temperament, wellness, and condition (particularly for household pets). Following breed judging, each judge ranks their top 10 cats in each class in a final. At the end of each day, the placements from each final are totalled up to score the Best of the Best Awards for each class. At the end of each show season (April 30 of each year), CCA-AFC awards the All Canadian Awards, which honour the 15 top scoring cats in each class from that season, along with the Regional Awards, which honour the top 15 cats from each class in each of CCA-AFC's six regions.

CCA-AFC offers a variety of titles. After a cat has competed in four rings without receiving a Withhold Awards or Disqualify designation, the owner may claim the title of Champion, Premier, or Companion (in Championship, Premiership, and Household Pet respectively). All Champions, Premiers, and Companions are then eligible to earn Grand titles, which are scored based on the number of cats beaten in each completed ring. CCA-AFC has a number of these advanced titles, including: Grand, Double Grand, Master Grand, and Supreme Master Grand. There are titles available for cats who win multiple All Canadian Awards (the Triple Crown), along with cats who place in a minimum of 30 finals in three separate seasons (Grand of Distinction), and cats who produce a certain number of Grand offspring (Elite Merit).

== Breeds ==
CCA-AFC recognizes a wide variety of cat breeds. Unlike other associations, CCA-AFC maintains strict divisions between certain breeds, ex. Himalayans are considered a separate breed from the Persian, and the offspring of a Himalayan x Persian cross are registered as Non-Pointed Himalayans. Non-standard offspring of several other outcrosses are also allowed to be shown, such as shorthair Somalis (the result of Abyssinian x Somali crosses) and shorthair Balinese (the result of Balinese x Siamese or Balinese x Colourpoint Shorthair) crosses.

The following is a list of breeds recognised by the Canadian Cat Association:

- Abyssinian
- American Bobtail (Longhair and Shorthair)
- American Curl (Longhair and Shorthair)
- American Shorthair
- American Wirehair
- Balinese (including Shorthair Balinese)
- Bengal
- Birman
- Bombay
- British (Shorthair and Longhair)
- Burmese
- Burmilla (Longhair and Shorthair)
- Chantilly (Experimental)
- Chartreux
- Colourpoint Shorthair
- Cornish Rex
- Cymric
- Devon Rex
- Don Skoy (Experimental)
- Egyptian Mau
- Exotic (Shorthair and Longhair)
- Foldex (Shorthair and Longhair, Straight and Fold)
- Foreign Burmese
- Havana Brown
- Himalayan (including Non-Pointed Himalayan)
- Japanese Bobtail (Longhair and Shorthair)
- Khaomanee
- Korat
- Kurillian Bobtail (Longhair and Shorthair)
- Lykoi
- Maine Coon (excluding polydactyls)
- Manx
- Norwegian Forest Cat
- Ocicat
- Oriental (Longhair and Shorthair)
- Persian
- Peterbald
- Pixiebob (Longhair and Shorthair)
- Ragamuffin
- Ragdoll
- Russian Blue
- Savannah
- Scottish Fold (Longhair and Shorthair)
- Scottish Straight (Longhair and Shorthair)
- Selkirk Rex (Longhair and Shorthair)
- Siamese
- Siberian (including the Pointed Neva Masquerade as a separate breed)
- Singapura
- Sokoke (Experimental)
- Somali (including Shorthair Somali)
- Sphynx
- Tonkinese
- Turkish Angora
- York Chocolate

== See also ==
- List of cat breeds
- List of cat registries
