= Arabian Mau =

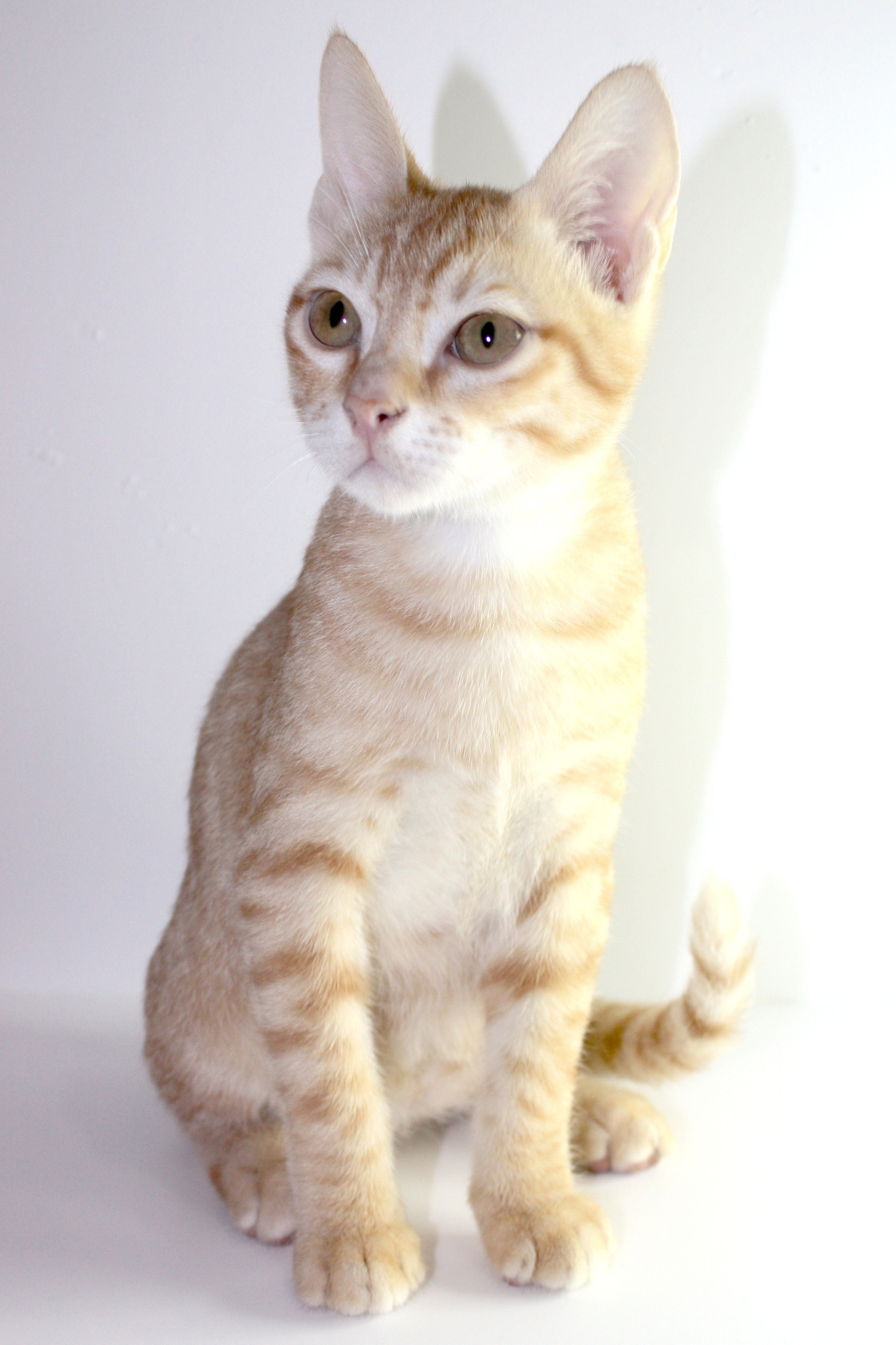
- An Arabian Mau kitten at three months of age
- Origin: Arabian Peninsula

Breed standards
- WCF: standard

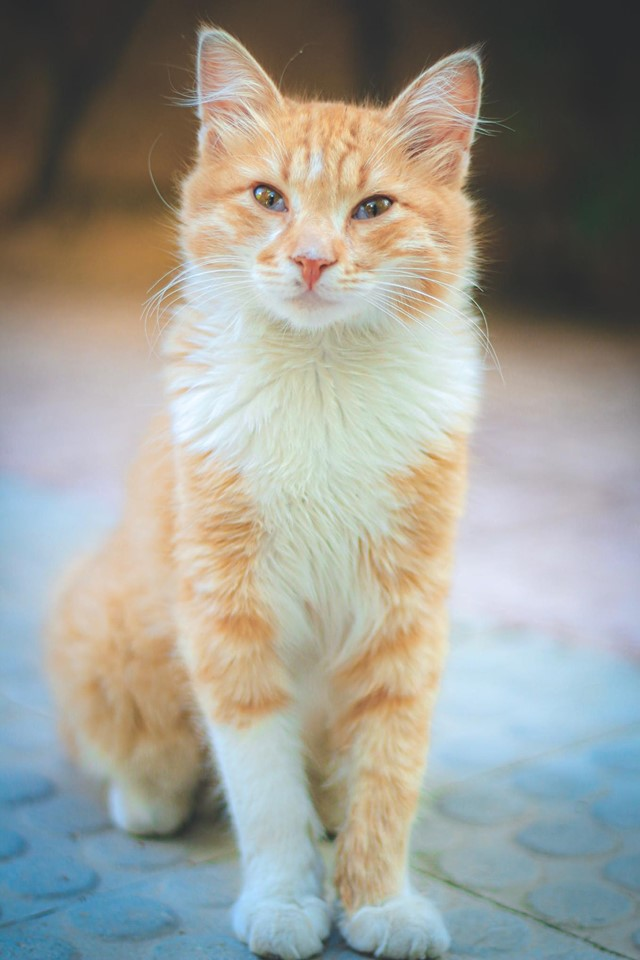
Red tabby and white bicolor Arabian Mau

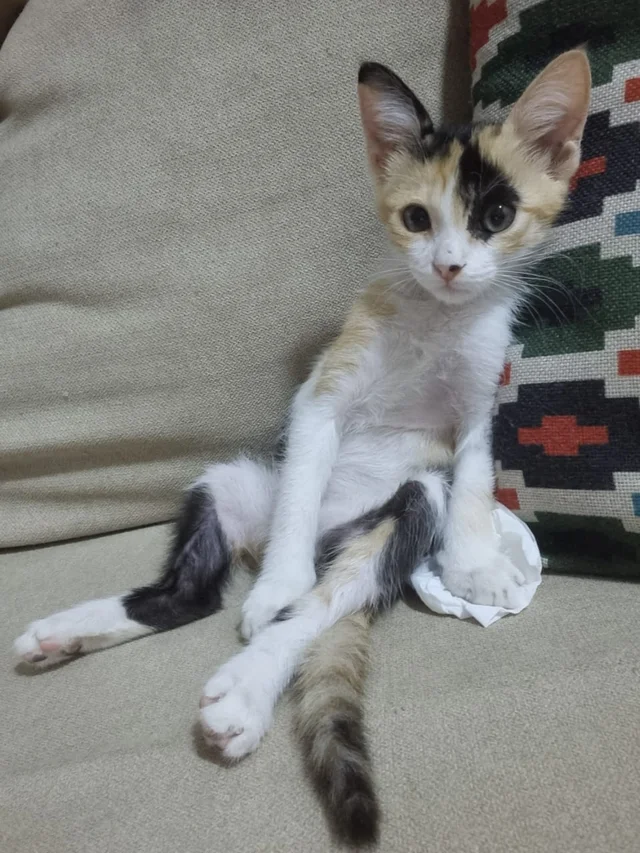
Calico Arabian Mau kitten

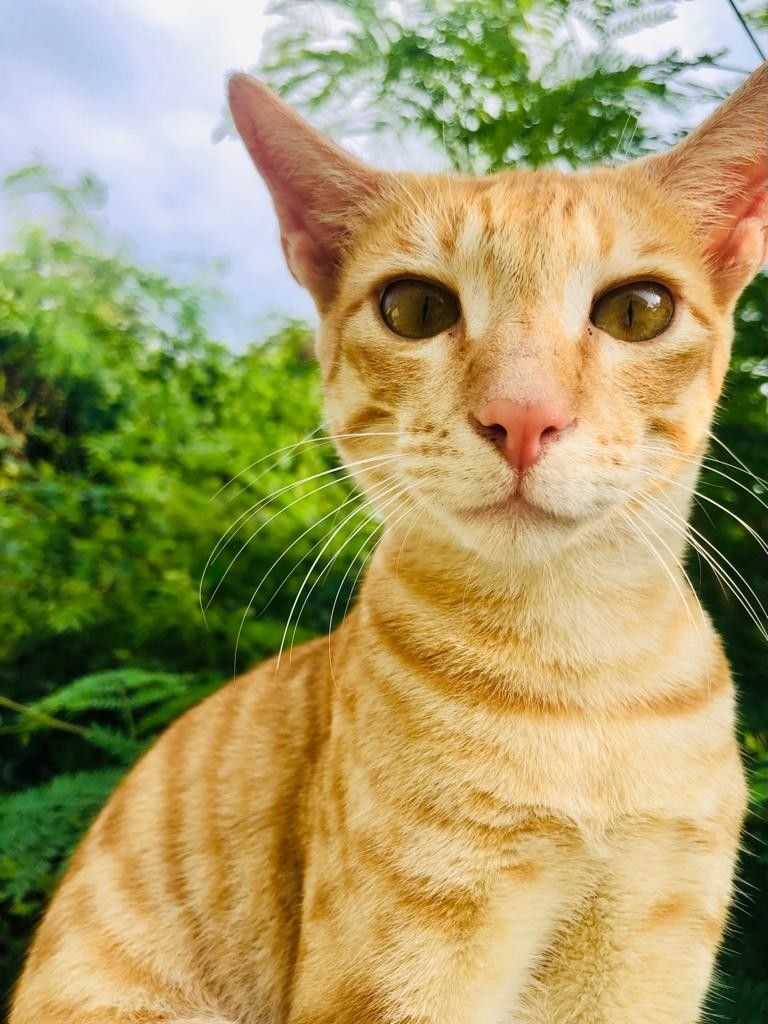
Red tabby Arabian Mau close-up

The Arabian Mau is a domestic cat breed developed from a naturally occurring short-haired population with distant ancestry from the early African wildcat. It is a landrace and formally recognized breed by a number of prominent cat registries, such as the World Cat Federation (WCF) and the Emirates Feline Federation (EFF). This cat is native to the Arabian Peninsula, which it has inhabited for over a millennium.

It is a medium-sized cat, having a body structure that is rather large and firm, not particularly slender, and with well-developed musculature. The legs are comparatively long, with oval paws.

The head appears round, but is slightly longer than broad. The nose is slightly concave when viewed in profile. The whisker pads are clearly pronounced, with a slight pinch. The chin is very firm. The eyes are slightly oval, large and slightly slanted. While it may have any of the eye colours typical of cats, the Arabian Mau usually has bright green eyes, and there is no relation between the eye and coat colours. The ears are large, slightly forward and sideward-placed, a little long, and high-set on the skull.

While the Arabian Mau is technically not hypoallergenic, its low propensity for shedding and dander production may cause lesser reactions in those with mild allergies.

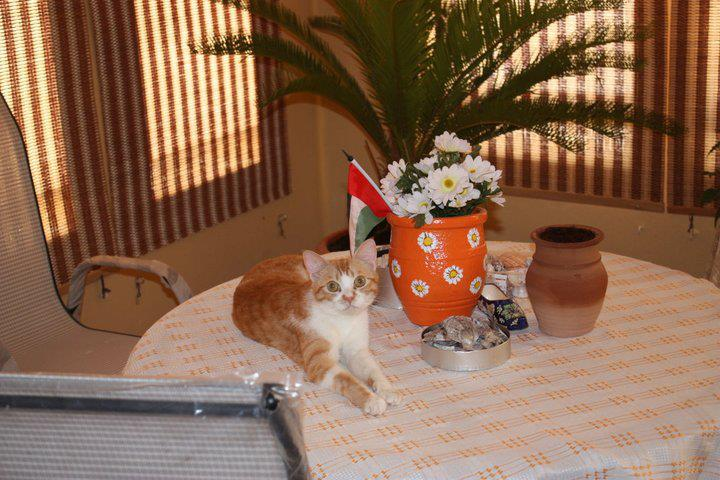
Bicolor female Arabian Mau cat

== History ==
The breed has been a landrace native to the Arabian Peninsula, including Saudi Arabia, Kuwait, Qatar, Oman, Bahrain, and the United Arab Emirates, for more than 1,000 years. As a desert cat, it is well adapted to the region's hot and arid environment.

== Grooming ==
Arabian Mau have short fur without an undercoat and as such, are not high shedders. They are very capable of keeping themselves neatly groomed, which enables easier caretaking by a handler or owner. While not always necessary, brushing will remove dead hairs and intensify the gloss of the coat.

== Standard Arabian Mau ==
Females are medium-sized and elegant; however, males can be much larger and have muscular bodies. Their legs are long with perfectly oval paws. The tail has medium length with tapering toward the tip. The head appears to be round, but it is slightly longer than broad with well-defined whisker pads. Ears are large and well set. Their eyes are oval and match the coat color. The fur is short and has no undercoat, besides it lying close to the body. The coat should not be silky. The colors can be different but the most recognized are red, white, black, and brown tabby.

The Arabian Mau is a natural breed, and it reflects the morphology and behavioural features of cats living within the Arabian Peninsula. The breed standard is based on the observation and description of physical characteristics that have been found in cats of this area.

Arabian Mau cats were approved by the WCF during the Annual General Meeting held on 2–3 August 2008 in Germany. They have been eligible to participate in international shows since 1 January 2009.

== See also ==
- Egyptian Mau
