= Egyptian Mau =

Breed of domestic cat

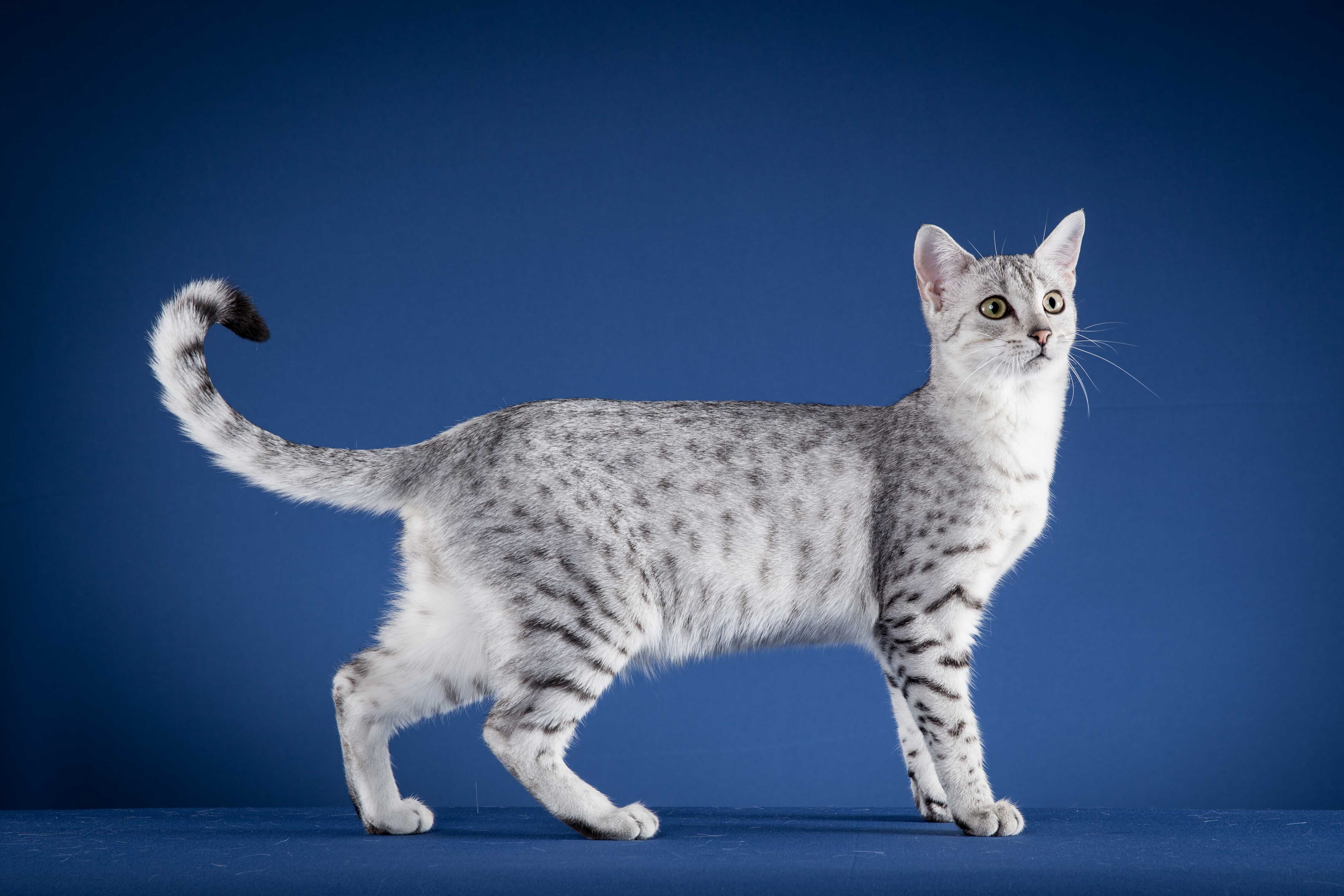
- Black silver spotted tabby Egyptian Mau
- Common nicknames: Mau
- Origin: Egypt

Breed standards
- CFA: standard
- FIFe: standard
- TICA: standard
- ACFA/CAA: standard
- CCA-AFC: standard
- GCCF: standard

The Egyptian Mau is a small to medium-sized, short to medium-haired rare standardised cat breed. It bears a solid or spotted tabby coat pattern, which makes the Mau relatively unique as it is one of the few naturally spotted tabby breeds of domesticated cat. The spots of the Mau only occur on the tips of the hairs of its coat.

== History ==
=== Breed development ===
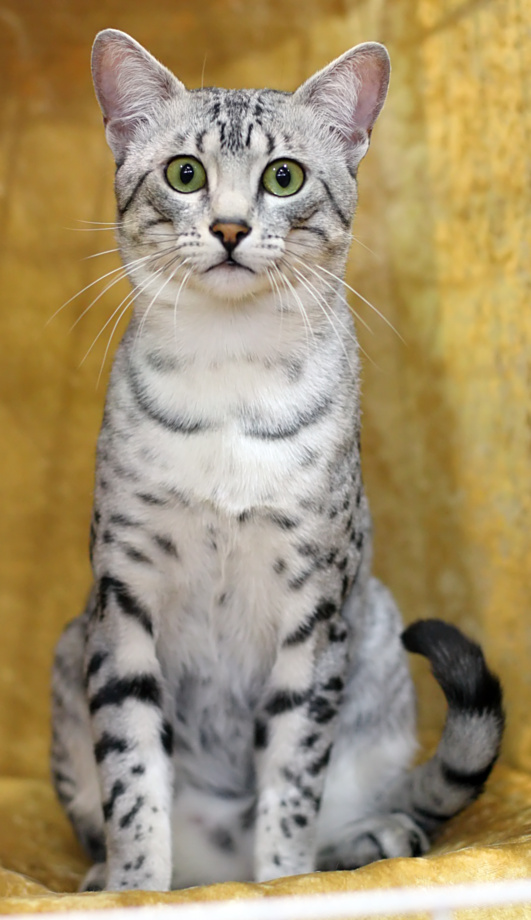
Black silver spotted tabby Mau

In 1953 in Italy, Princess Natalie Trubetskoy saw a cat belonging to the Egyptian ambassador to Italy and after asking about the cat she persuaded him to help her obtain a cat from Cairo. She obtained a female named Baba, who was later bred with the ambassador's cat. A male bronze tabby was born and he was bred back to his mother to produce a female named Lisa. These progenitors were first shown in 1955 at the Rome Cat Show. English fanciers attempted to reproduce this novel breed by using Abyssinians, Siamese, and tabby cats which became the Ocicat. Princess Natalie travelled with her three Maus to the United States in 1956 and in the following year Baba became a champion. The U.S. Maus are purportedly from Baba, although other reports claim they are descended from a pair named Gepa and Ludol, brought into the country in 1953.

=== Genetic origins ===
Feline genome data shows that the Egyptian Mau is very closely related to the Maine Coon, Korat, and Westen Turkish Angoras (different from Turkish Angora landrace cats). Phylogenetic tree research demonstrates that the Egyptian Mau belongs to the group of Western-derived breeds. The East Mediterranean/Anatolian group was excluded from the study since breeds thought to originate there actually do.

== Breed registration ==
=== Breed recognition ===
The breed first received championship in 1968 with the Cat Fanciers Federation (CFF) followed later on with recognition from the Cat Fanciers' Association (CFA) in 1977 and The International Cat Association (TICA) in 1979. By the 1990s there were breeders in North America, Europe, and Japan. The Egyptian Mau did not reach British shores until 1998 when the first Maus were imported by Melissa Bateson, 8 years after it received full recognition from the Governing Council of the Cat Fancy (GCCF).

=== Popularity ===
Egyptian Maus are a relatively rare breed worldwide. In 2018, the Egyptian Mau ranked at position 27 out of 45 cat breeds registered with the CFA. Fewer than 200 kittens are registered with the GCCF each year. In 2022, only 39 Mau kittens were registered at the GCCF, ranking the cat breed at position 27 out of 40 breeds in popularity. In the 2024 statistics of FIFe, one of the major global cat registries, the breed ranked at position 31 out of 54 breeds in popularity, comprising 0.1% of their total registered kittens that year, which translates to 113 cats.

== Characteristics ==
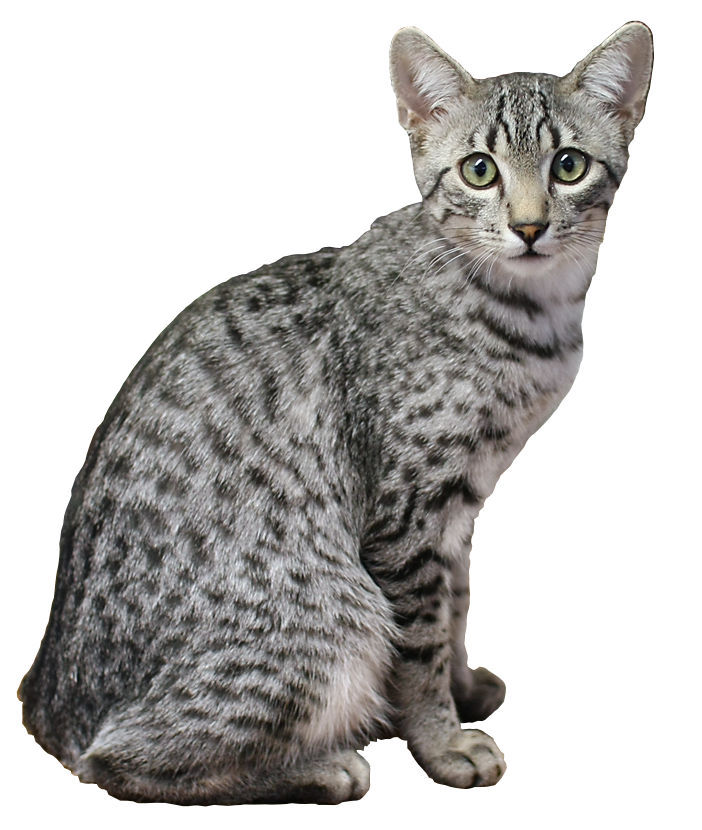
Black silver spotted tabby Mau

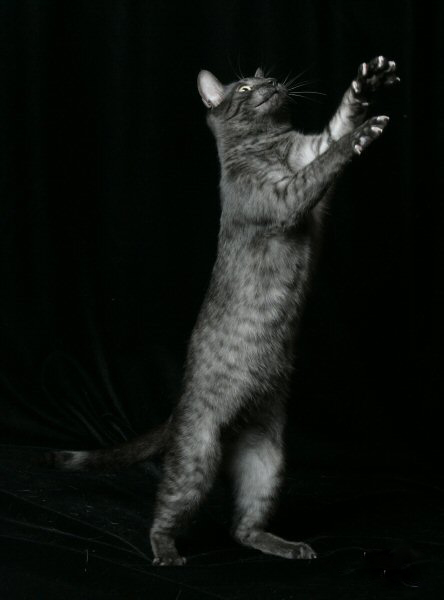
Black smoke Mau

The breed conformation is described as "a balance between the compactness of a Burmese and the slim elegance of a Siamese. Its medium-length body is muscular, with the hind legs longer than the front, giving the Mau the appearance of standing on tiptoes when upright."

The Egyptian Mau is the fastest of the domestic cats, with its longer hind legs, and unique flap of skin extending from the flank to the back knee, which assists in running by allowing the legs to stretch back further, providing for greater agility and length of stride. Maus have been clocked running more than 48 km/h (30 mph).

=== Appearance ===
The Egyptian Mau is a muscular cat with notable features being their spotted coat and a tabby marking on their forehead that is said to resemble a scarab design. The head is gently rounded and of medium size. The ears are medium to moderately large, broad at the base with a bit of pointing at the tip. The hair on the ears is short and may have tufting. The eyes are round and large. The eyes are light green although kittens may have amber eyes. The body is of medium length with prominent shoulder blades. There is a loose flap of skin extending from the flank to the knee of the hind legs. The tail is of medium length and thick at the base.

==== Coat ====
The Egyptian Mau has a medium length coat with two or more bands of ticking. The Egyptian Mau's coat contains dark patterns of varying size and shape, located all over the body and limbs. They also may have a stripe running down the lower spine and tail.

Maus are accepted in the following colour-pattern combinations:

- black silver spotted tabby
- black ('bronze') spotted tabby
- black smoke

Non-smoke solid black and blue/pewter are non-recognised colourations, which are still permitted in the pedigree of some registries, however they are recorded on the reference register.

== Health ==
The Egyptian Mau has a higher prevalence of urate urolithiasis (bladder stones) than mixed-breeds. A review of over 5,000 cases of urate uroliths had almost half the population of Egyptian Maus as having had the condition with an odds ratio of 44.41. A Canadian study with over 10,000 examinations of uroliths in cats found that 14 out of 17 Egyptian Maus surveyed had urate urolithiasis.

The typical gestation period for a regular house cat is 64–67 days, but the Egyptian Mau has a longer gestation period, at 73 days.

== Gallery ==
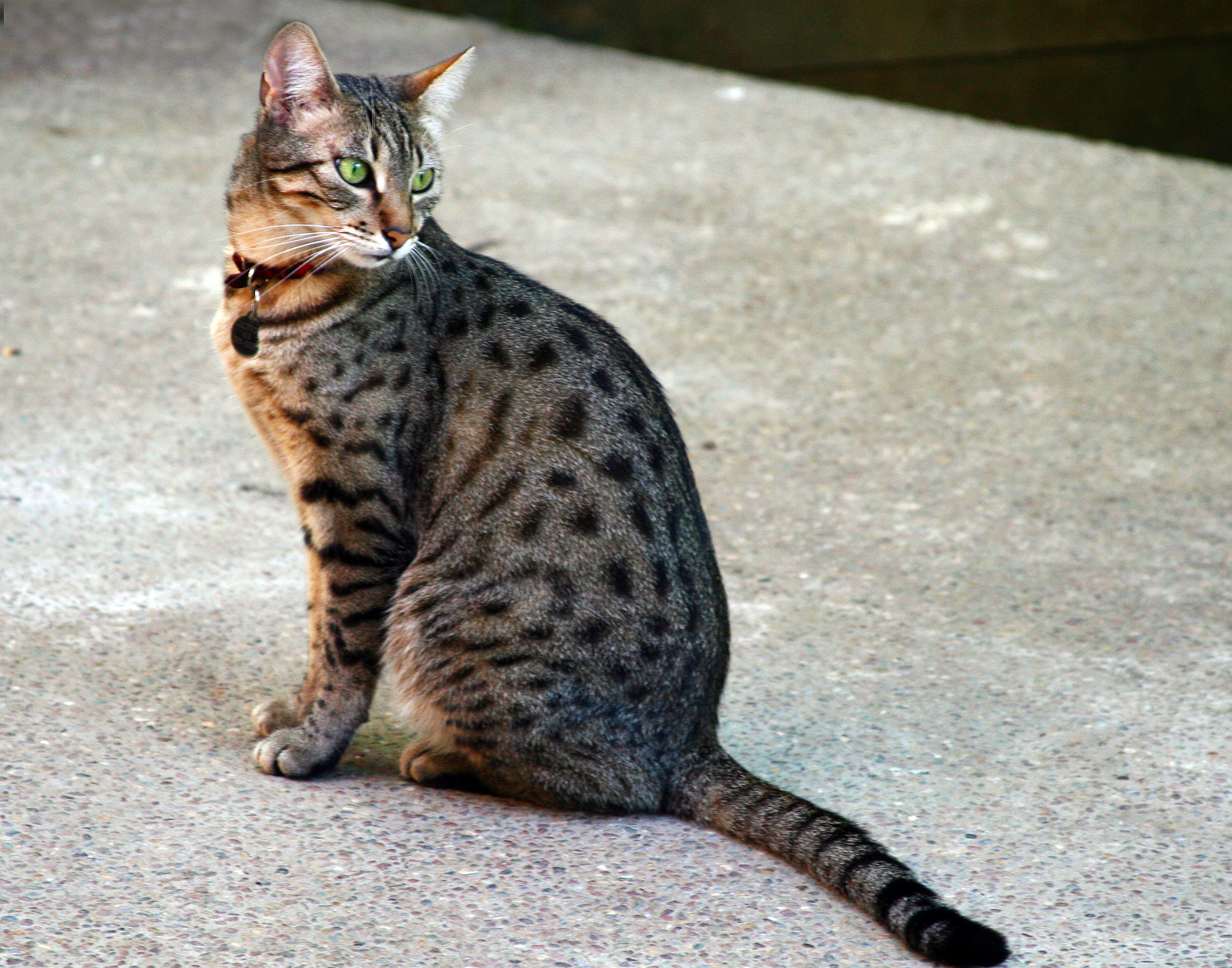
"Bronze" spotted tabby Mau

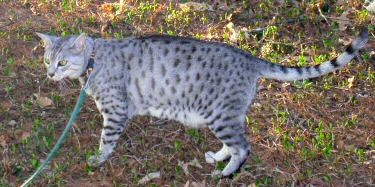
Black silver spotted tabby Mau

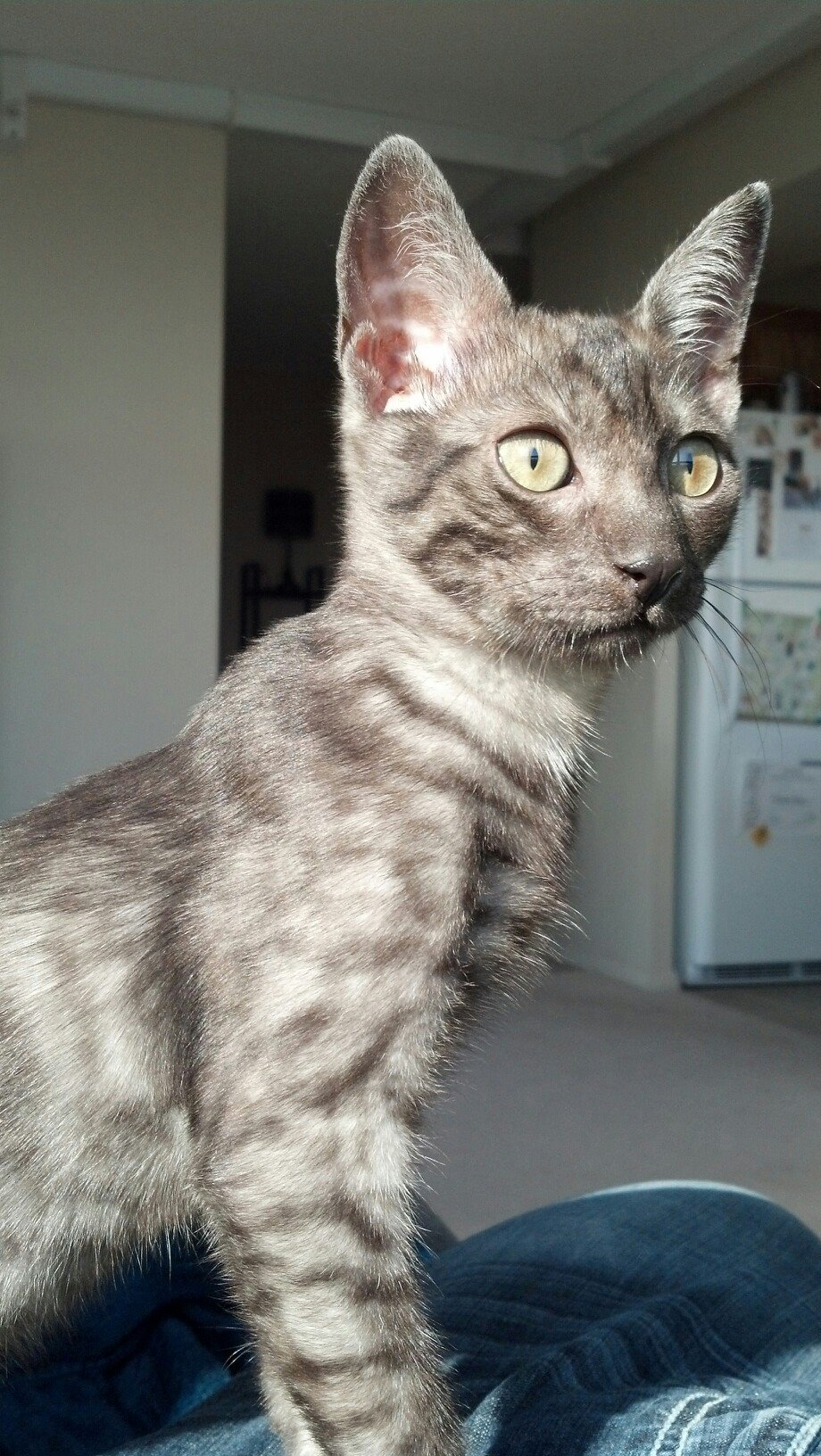
Black smoke Mau kitten

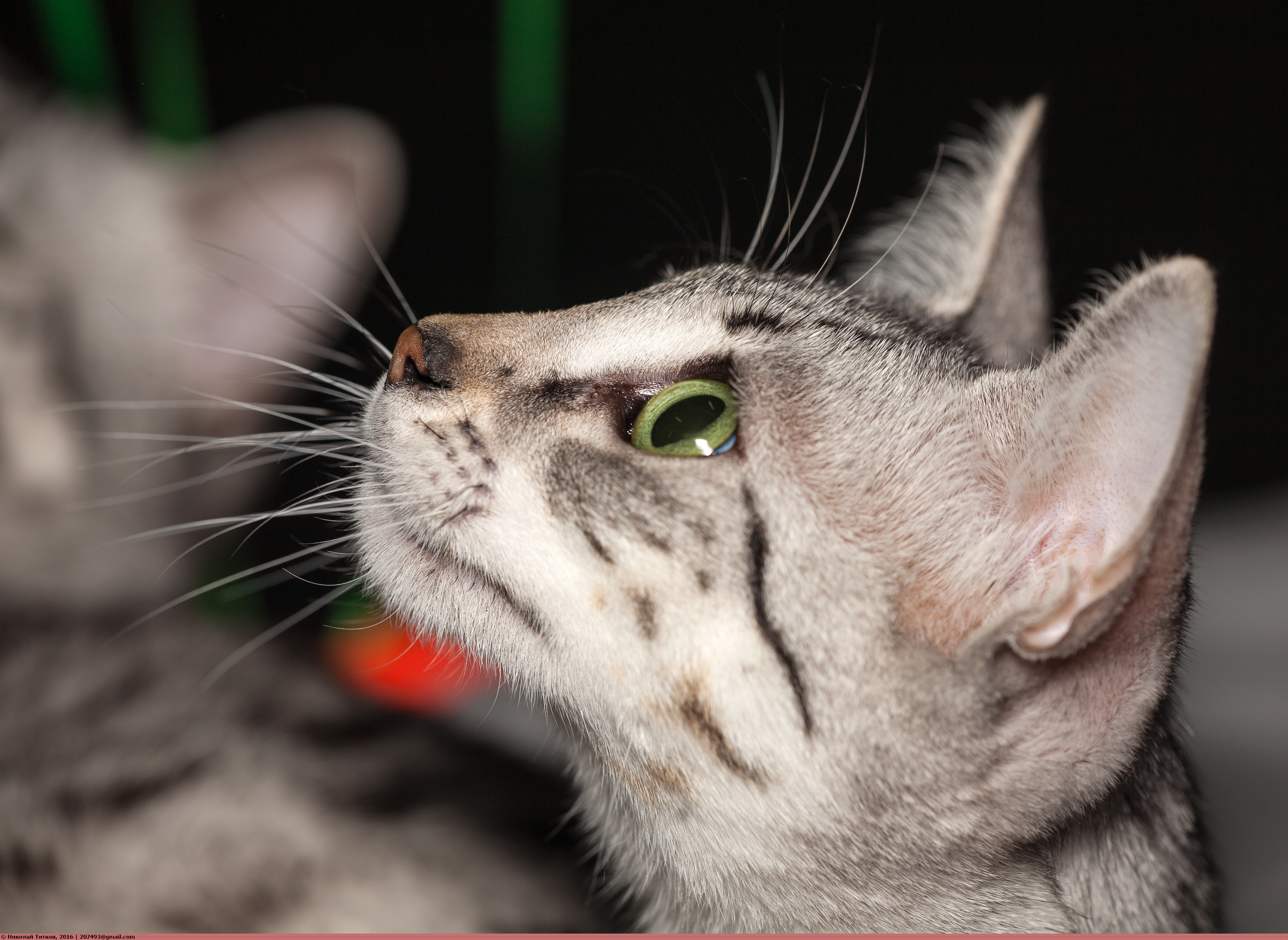
Head side profile

== See also ==
- Arabian Mau
