= Landrace =

Locally adapted variety of a species

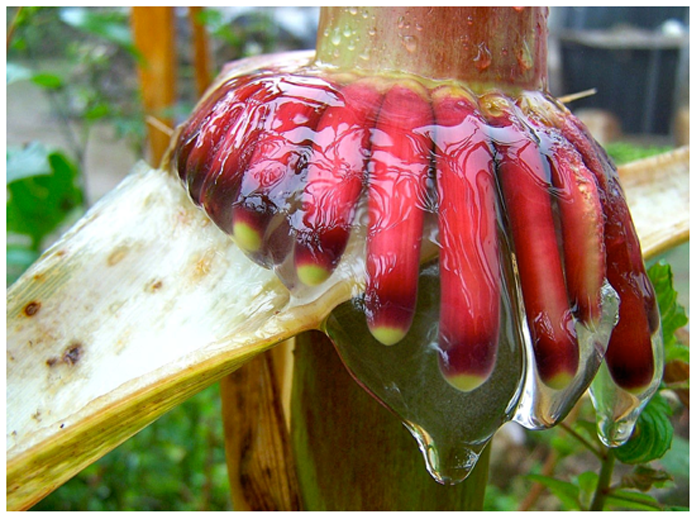
Aerial roots of a maize landrace, Sierra Mixe corn, grown in nitrogen-depleted soils in the Sierra Mixe, known for aerial roots with a gel-like biofilm that contributes substantially to the plant's nitrogen supply

A landrace is a domesticated, locally adapted, often traditional variety of a species of an animal, plant or fungus that has developed over time, through adaptation to its natural and cultural environment of agriculture and pastoralism, and due to isolation from other populations of the species. Landraces are distinct from cultivars and from standard breeds.

A significant proportion of farmers around the world grow landrace crops, and most plant landraces are associated with traditional agricultural systems. Landraces of many crops have probably been grown for millennia. Increasing reliance upon modern plant cultivars that are bred to be uniform has led to a reduction in biodiversity, because most of the genetic diversity of domesticated plant species lies in landraces and other traditionally used varieties. Some farmers using scientifically improved varieties also continue to raise landraces for agronomic reasons that include better adaptation to the local environment, lower fertilizer requirements, lower cost, and better disease resistance. Cultural and market preferences for landraces include culinary uses and product attributes such as texture, color, or ease of use.

Plant landraces have been the subject of more academic research, and the majority of academic literature about landraces is focused on botany in agriculture, not animal husbandry. Animal landraces are distinct from ancestral wild species of modern animal stock, and are also distinct from separate species or subspecies derived from the same ancestor as modern domestic stock. Not all landraces derive from wild or ancient animal stock; in some cases, notably dogs and horses, domestic animals have escaped in sufficient numbers in an area to breed feral populations that form new landraces through evolutionary pressure.

== Characteristics ==
There are differences between authoritative sources on the specific criteria which describe landraces, although there is broad consensus about the existence and utility of the classification. Individual criteria may be weighted differently depending on a given source's focus (e.g., governmental regulation, biological sciences, agribusiness, anthropology and culture, environmental conservation, pet-keeping and -breeding, etc.). Additionally, not all cultivars agreed to be landraces exhibit every characteristic of a landrace. General features that characterize a landrace may include:

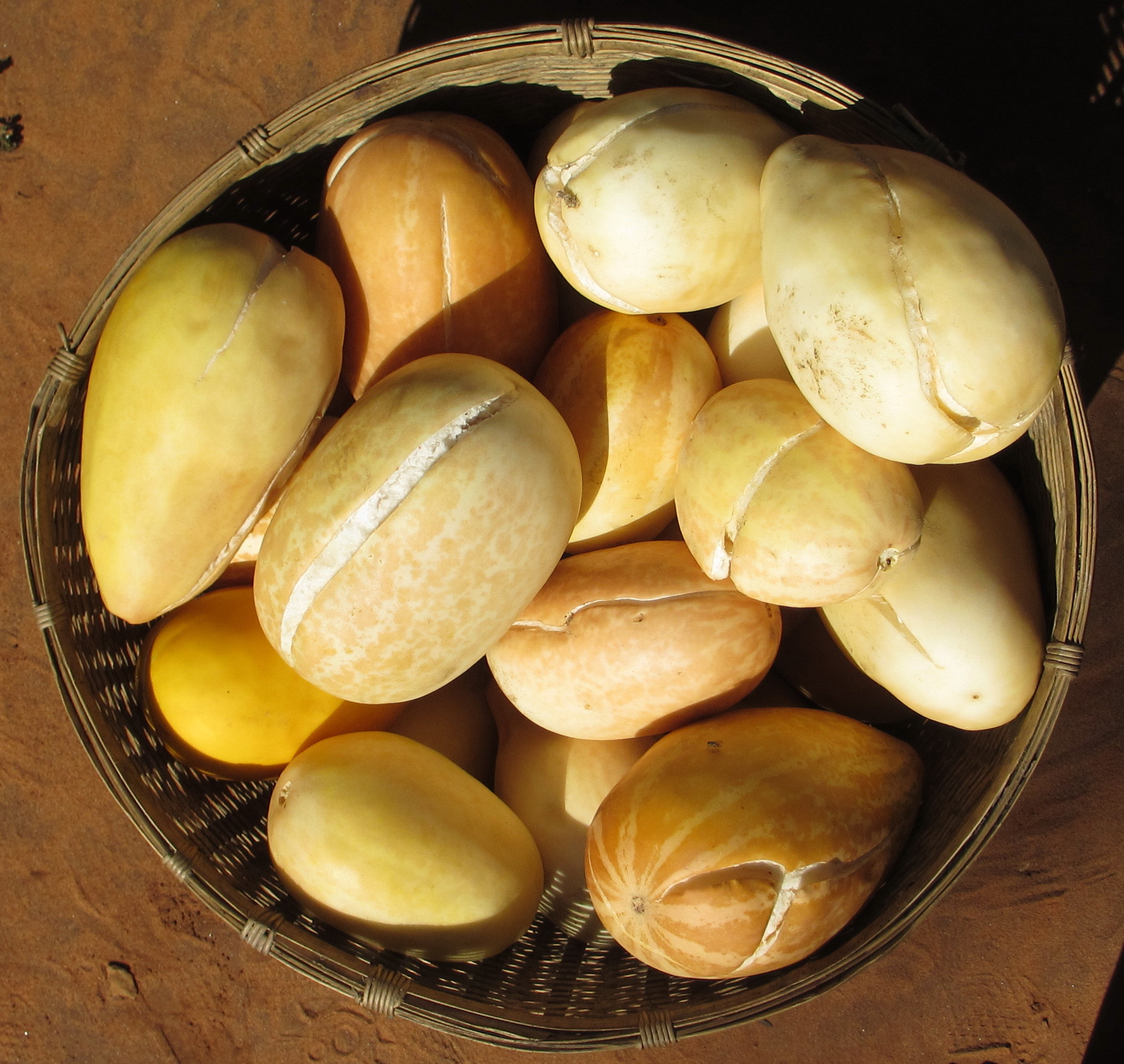
A basket of landrace melons (Cucumis melo subspecies agrestis, cultivar group Momordica) from northern Mozambique. This landrace incorporates different colours and patterns of the fruit surface and is the only melon cultivar group in northern Mozambique.

- It is morphologically distinctive and identifiable (i.e., has particular and recognizable characteristics or properties), yet remains "dynamic".
- It is genetically adapted to, and has a reputation for being able to withstand, the conditions of the local environment, including climate, disease and pests, even cultural practices.
- It is not the product of formal (governmental, organizational, or private) breeding programs, and may lack systematic selection, development and improvement by breeders.
- It is maintained and fostered less deliberately than a standardized breed, with its genetic isolation principally a matter of geography acting upon whatever animals that happened to be brought by humans to a given area.
- It has a historical origin in a specific geographic area, will usually have its own local name(s), and will often be classified according to intended purpose.
- Where yield (e.g. of a grain or fruit crop) can be measured, a landrace will show high stability of yield, even under adverse conditions, but a moderate yield level, even under carefully managed conditions.
- At the level of genetic testing, its heredity will show a degree of integrity, but still some genetic heterogeneity (i.e. genetic diversity).

== Terminology ==
Landrace literally means 'country-breed' (German: Landrasse) and close cognates of it are found in various Germanic languages. The first known reference to the role of landraces as genetic resources was made in 1890 at an agriculture and forestry congress in Vienna, Austria. The term was first defined by Kurt von Rümker in 1908, and more clearly described in 1909 by U. J. Mansholt, who wrote that landraces have more stable characteristics and better resistance to adverse conditions, but have lower production capacity than cultivars, and are apt to change genetically when moved to another environment. Hans Kiessling added in 1912 that a landrace is a mixture of phenotypic forms despite relative outward uniformity, and a great adaptability to its natural and human environment.

The word landrace entered non-academic English in the early 1930s, by way of the Danish Landrace pig, a particular breed of lop-eared swine. Many other languages do not use separate terms, like landrace and breed, but instead rely on extended description to convey such distinctions. Spanish is one such language.

Geneticist D. Phillip Sponenberg described animal breeds within these classes: the landrace, the standardized breed, modern "type" breeds, industrial strains, and feral populations. He describes landraces as an early stage of breed development, created by a combination of founder effect, isolation, and environmental pressures. Human selection for production goals is also typical of landraces.

As discussed in more detail in breed, that term itself has several definitions from various scientific and animal husbandry perspectives. Some of those senses of breed relate to the concept of landraces. A Food and Agriculture Organization of the United Nations (FAO) guideline defines landrace and landrace breed as "a breed that has largely developed through adaptation to the natural environment and traditional production system in which it has been raised." This is in contrast to its definition of a standardized breed: "a breed of livestock that was developed according to a strict programme of genetic isolation and formal artificial selection to achieve a particular phenotype."

In various domestic species (including pigs, goats, sheep and geese) some standardized breeds include "Landrace" in their names, but do not meet widely used definitions of landraces. For example, the British Landrace pig is a standardized breed, derived from earlier breeds with "Landrace" names.

Farmers' variety, usually applied to local cultivars, or seen as intermediate between a landrace and a cultivar, may also include landraces when referring to plant varieties not subjected to formal breeding programs.

=== Autochthonous and allochthonous landraces ===
A landrace native to, or produced for a long time within the agricultural system in which it is found is referred to as an autochthonous landrace, while a more recently introduced one is termed an allochthonous landrace.

Within academic agronomy, the term autochthonous landrace is sometimes used with a more technical, productivity-related definition, synthesized by A. C. Zeven from previous definitions beginning with Mansholt's: "an autochthonous landrace is a variety with a high capacity to tolerate biotic and abiotic stress, resulting in a high yield stability and an intermediate yield level under a low input agricultural system."

The terms autochthonous and allochthonous are most often applied to plants, with animals more often being referred to as indigenous or native. Examples of references in sources to long-term local landraces of livestock include constructions such as "indigenous landraces of sheep", and "Leicester Longwool sheep were bred to the native landraces of the region". Some usage of autochthonous does occur in reference to livestock, e.g. "autochthonous races of cattle such as the Asturian mountain cattle – Ratina and Casina – and Tudanca cattle."

== Biodiversity and conservation ==
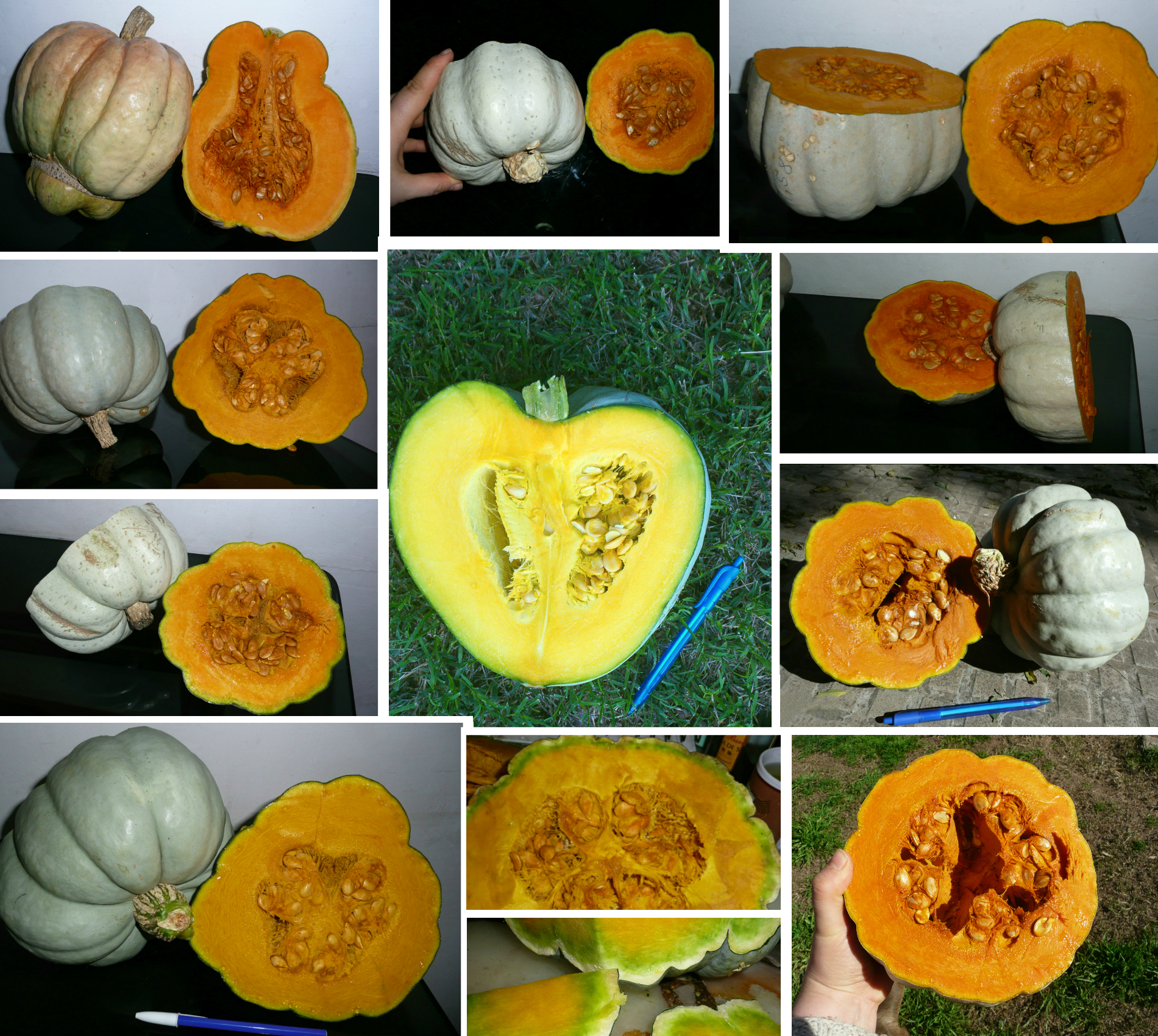
A morphologically diverse group of fruit from the Zapallo Plomo landrace of Cucurbita maxima squash

A significant proportion of farmers around the world grow landrace crops. However, as industrialized agriculture spreads, cultivars, which are selectively bred for high yield, rapid growth, disease and drought resistance, and other commercial production values, are supplanting landraces, putting more and more of them at risk of extinction.

In 1927 at the International Agricultural Congress, organized by the predecessor of the FAO, an extensive discussion was held on the need to conserve landraces. A recommendation that members organize nation-by-nation landrace conservation did not succeed in leading to widespread conservation efforts.

Landraces are often free from many intellectual property and other regulatory encumbrances. However, in some jurisdictions, a focus on their production may result in missing out on some benefits afforded to producers of genetically selected and homogenous organisms, including breeders' rights legislation, easier availability of loans and other business services, even the right to share seed or stock with others, depending on how favorable the laws in the area are to high-yield agribusiness interests.

As Regine Andersen of the Fridtjof Nansen Institute (Norway) and the Farmers' Rights Project puts it, "Agricultural biodiversity is being eroded. This trend is putting at risk the ability of future generations to feed themselves. In order to reverse the trend, new policies must be implemented worldwide. The irony of the matter is that the poorest farmers are the stewards of genetic diversity." Protecting farmer interests and protecting biodiversity is at the heart of the International Treaty on Plant Genetic Resources for Food and Agriculture (the "Plant Treaty" for short), under the Food and Agriculture Organization of the United Nations (FAO), though its concerns are not exclusively limited to landraces.

Landraces played a basic role in the development of the standardized breeds but are today threatened by the market success of the standardized breeds. In developing countries, landraces still play an important role, especially in traditional production systems. Specimens within an animal landrace tend to be genetically similar, though more diverse than members of a standardized or formal breed.

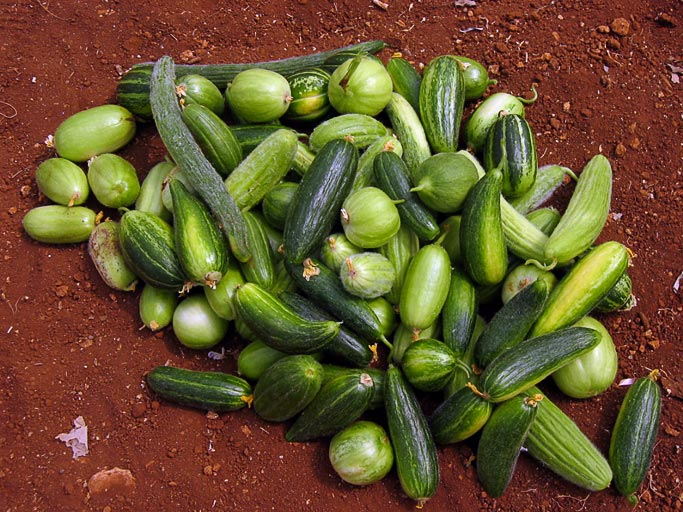
Carosello and Barattiere, Italian landraces of Cucumis melo whose fruits are eaten unripe

=== In situ and ex situ landrace conservation ===
Two approaches have been used to conserve plant landraces:

- in situ where the landrace is grown and conserved by farmers on farms.
- ex situ where the landrace is conserved in an artificial environment such as a gene-bank, using controls such as laminated packets kept frozen at −18 °C (0 °F).

As the amount of agricultural land dedicated to growing landrace crops declines, such as in the example of wheat landraces in the Fertile Crescent, landraces can become extinct in cultivation. Therefore ex situ landrace conservation practices are considered a way to avoid losing the genetic diversity completely. Research published in 2020 suggested that existing ways of cataloging diversity within ex situ genebanks fall short of cataloging the appropriate information for landrace crops.

An in situ conservation effort to save the Berrettina di Lungavilla squash landrace made use of participatory plant breeding practices in order to incorporate the local community into the work.

=== Preserving cereal landraces ===
Preservation efforts for cereal strains are ongoing including in situ and in online-searchable germplasm collections (seed banks), coordinated by Biodiversity International and the National Institute of Agricultural Botany (NIAB, UK). However, more may need to be done, because plant genetic variety, the source of crop health and seed quality, depends on a diversity of landraces and other traditionally used varieties. Efforts (as of 2008) were mostly focused on Iberia, the Balkans, and European Russia, and dominated by species from mountainous areas. Despite their incompleteness, these efforts have been described as "crucial in preventing the extinction of many of these local ecotypes".

An agricultural study published in 2008 showed that landrace cereal crops began to decline in Europe in the 19th century such that cereal landraces "have largely fallen out of use" in Europe. Landrace cultivation in central and northwest Europe was almost eradicated by the early 20th century, due to economic pressure to grow improved, modern cultivars. While many in the region are already extinct, some have survived by being passed from generation to generation, and have also been revived by enthusiasts outside Europe to preserve European agriculture and food culture elsewhere. These survivals are usually for specific uses, such as thatch, and traditional European cuisine and craft beer brewing.

== Plants ==
=== Plant landrace development ===
The label landrace includes regional cultigens that are genetically heterogeneous, but with enough characteristics in common to permit their recognition as a group. These characteristics are used by farmers to manage diversity and purity within landraces.

In some cultures, the development of new landraces is typically limited to members of specific social groups, such as women or shaman. Maintaining existing landraces, like developing new landraces, requires that farmers be able to identify crop-specific characteristics and that those characteristics are passed on to following generations.

Over time, the process of identifying the distinguishing characteristic or features of a new landrace is reinforced by cultivation processes; for example, descendants of a plant that is notably drought tolerant may become iteratively more so through selective breeding as farmers regard it as better for dry areas and prioritize planting it in those locations. This is one way in which farming systems can develop a portfolio of landraces over time that have specific ecological niches and uses.

Conversely, modern cultivars can also be developed into a landrace over time when farmers save seed and practice selective breeding.

Although landraces are often discussed once they have become endemic to a particular geographical region, landraces have always been moved over long and short distances. Some landraces can adapt to various environments, while others only thrive within specific conditions. Self-fertilizing and vegetatively populated species adapt by changing the frequencies of phenotypes. Outbreeding crops absorb new genotypes through intentional and unintentional hybridization, or through mutation.

A clear example of vegetal landrace would consist in the diverse adaptations of wheat to differential artificial selection constraints.

=== Cultivars developed from landraces ===
Members of a landrace variety, selected for uniformity with regards to a unique feature over a period of time, can be developed into a farmers' variety or cultivar. Traits from landraces are valuable for incorporation into elite lines. Crop disease resistance genes from landraces can provide eternally-needed resistances to more widely used, modern varieties.

=== Examples of plant landraces ===
==== Beans ====
Name	Species	Origin	Description
Caparrona bean	Phaseolus vulgaris	Monzón, Spain	Also known by the name of Caparrona de Monzón, characterized by highly productive plants with white beans that have a brown pattern around the hilum, medium brilliance, and oval shape. The Caparrona bean is usually used as a dry bean but can also be eaten as a green bean.
Ganxet bean			

==== Carrots ====
Name	Species	Origin	Description
Carota di Polignano	Daucus carota	Polignano, Italy	Multicolored roots from yellow to purple

==== Maize ====
Name	Species	Origin	Description
Sierra Mixe corn	Zea mays	Sierra Mixe	Tall with aerial roots that secrete mucus which is known to support nitrogen-fixing bacteria

==== Okra ====
Name	Species	Origin	Description
Khandahar Pendi	Abelmoschus esculentus	Afghanistan	Has green, red, pink, or white pods that have a variety of shapes and sizes.

==== Peas ====
Name	Species	Origin	Description
Maruti	Cajanus cajan		

==== Peppers ====
Name	Species	Origin	Description
Cacho de cabra	Capsicum annuum	Maule region of Chile	Considered to be the most popular in the region of Maule
Chileno negro	Capsicum baccatum	Maule region of Chile	
Chimayó pepper		Chimayó, New Mexico	Considered the most well known of the New Mexico chile landraces
Santo Domingo Pueblo chili		Santo Domingo Pueblo	An early-maturing landrace from the pueblo that served as a headquarters for Spanish colonial missions as well as a key location of resistance against the Spanish settlers in the 1600s.

==== Rice ====
Name	Species	Origin	Description
Jumli Marshi		Nepal	A cold-tolerant and popular rice landrace grown in mountain ecosystems. An evolutionary plant breeding program was used to increase its resistance to blast disease while maintaining landrace diversity.
Kalanamak rice			

==== Squash ====
Name	Species	Origin	Description
Berrettina di Lungavilla	Cucurbita maxima	Po river floodplain, Italy	From the Po floodplain in Northern Italy that nearly went extinct
Cappello da prete			
Plato kuum, cmejen kuum, calabacita kuum, xplato, 'kuum	Likely Cucurbita moschata	Yucatán, Mexico	Squash with 'pepita menuda' (Spanish) meaning 'thin seeds' Known as the 'little sister' to Cucurbita moschata Xnuk kuum. Xplato (Mayan-Spanish) literally translates to flat plate. Used for making a sweet called calabaza melada.
Candy roaster	Cucurbita maxima	Southern Appalachia	Developed by the Cherokee people. A United States Department of Agriculture accession in 1960 notes that Candy Roasters had been grown for more than 100 years as of that date. It is variable in size and shape with more than 40 distinct forms according to one authority. Candy roasters consistently feature fine-textured orange flesh, while varying in size (from 10 lbs to more than 250 lbs); shape (including round, cylindrical, teardrop, and blocky); and color (pink, tan, green, blue, gray, and orange).
Lakota squash	Cucurbita maxima	Nebraska	Developed from a squash landrace grown by Native Americans living along the Missouri Valley along with germplasm from Hubbard squash or a similar cultivar
Nanticoke squash	Cucurbita maxima	Maryland and Delaware	Cultivated by the Nanticoke (or Kuskarawaok) people, one of the southernmost groups in the Algonquin language family, who lived in the area now known as Maryland and Delaware during the American colonial period when Cucurbita maxima arrived in North America. The wide diversity of the fruit reflects the genetic diversity of the landrace.
Seminole Pumpkin	Cucurbita moschata	Florida	A landrace originally cultivated by the Seminole people of what is now Florida. Naturalists recorded Seminole pumpkins hanging from trees in the 18th century.

==== Tomatillo ====
Name	Species	Origin	Description
Acorazado, Acorazonado, Queen of Malinalco, Reina de Malinalco	Physalis ixocarpa	Malinalco	The name translates as "heart shaped", reflecting morphology which has also been described as "pointed or torpedo shaped", which is unusual for a tomatillo. The tomatillos taste fruity and sweet.

==== Tomatoes ====
Name	Species	Origin	Description
Coeur de bue tomato			
Corborino tomato			
Lucariello tomato			
San Marzano tomato	Solanum lycopersicum	Campania, Italy	

==== Wheat ====
Name	Species	Origin	Description
Arndeto			
Aybo			
Enat gebs			
Kurkure			
Loko			
Meher gebs			
Mengesha			
Nechita			
Sene gebs			
Set-Akuri			
Temej			
Tikur gebs			

== Animals ==
=== Animal landrace development ===
Some standardized animal breeds originate from attempts to make landraces more consistent through selective breeding, and a landrace may become a more formal breed with the creation of a breed registry or publication of a breed standard. In such a case, one may think of the landrace as a "stage" in breed development. However, in other cases, formalizing a landrace may result in the genetic resource of a landrace being lost through crossbreeding.

While many landrace animals are associated with farming, other domestic animals have been put to use as modes of transportation, as companion animals, for sporting purposes, and for other non-farming uses, so their geographic distribution may differ. For example, horse landraces are less common because human use of them for transport has meant that they have moved with people more commonly and constantly than most other domestic animals, reducing the incidence of populations locally genetically isolated for extensive periods of time.

=== Examples of animal landraces ===
==== Cats ====
Many standardized breeds have rather recently (within a century or less) been derived from landraces. Examples, often called natural breeds, include Arabian Mau, Egyptian Mau, Korat, Kurilian Bobtail, Maine Coon, Manx, Norwegian Forest Cat, Siberian, and Siamese.

In some cases, such as the Turkish Angora and Turkish Van breeds and their possible derivation from the Van cat landrace, the relationships are not entirely clear.

Name	Species	Origin	Description
Cyprus			
Aegean			
Domestic long-haired			
Domestic short-haired			
Kellas			
Sokoke			
Thai		Thailand	The ancestor of the Siamese cat breed, among many others.
Van cat		Turkey	The Van cat of modern-day Turkey is a landrace of symbolic and (disputed) cultural value to Turks, Armenians and Kurds.

==== Cattle ====
Name	Species	Origin	Description
Icelandic cattle		Iceland	As a population dating from the era of Icelandic settlement they are likely the oldest cattle landrace in Europe, owing to their genetic isolation for most of that time.
Yakutian cattle		Sakha Republic, Russian Federation	Noted as the northernmost cattle landrace, and the most genetically dissimilar to other cattle. This group of cattle may represent a fourth Aurochs domestication event (and a third event among Bos taurus–type aurochs) and may have diverged from the Near East group some 35,000 years ago. Yakutian cattle are the last remaining native Turano-Mongolian cattle breed in Siberia, and one of only a few pure Turano-Mongolian breeds remaining worldwide. Studies of DNA markers on autosomes show a high genetic distinctiveness and point to a long-term genetic isolation from other breeds; geographic isolation beyond the normal northern limit of the species range can be assumed to be the cause.

==== Dogs ====
Dog landraces and the selectively bred dog breeds that follow breed standards vary widely depending on their origins and purpose. Landraces are distinguished from dog breeds which have breed standards, breed clubs and registries.

Landrace dogs are commonly referenced. They typically have distinct ecological and behavioral characteristics that evolutionally developed in certain nations and locales, especially those with a history of colonization. Landrace dogs have more variety in their appearance than do standardized dog breeds. An example of a dog landrace with a related standardized breed with a similar name is the collie. The Scotch Collie is a landrace, while the Rough Collie and the Border Collie are standardized breeds. They can be very different in appearance, though the Rough Collie in particular was developed from the Scotch Collie by inbreeding to fix certain highly desired traits. In contrast to the landrace, in the various standardized Collie breeds, purebred individuals closely match a breed-standard appearance but might have lost other useful characteristics and have developed undesirable traits linked to inbreeding.

The ancient landrace dogs of the Fertile Crescent that led to the Saluki breed excels in running down game across open tracts of hot desert, but conformation-bred individuals of the breed are not necessarily able to chase and catch desert hares.

Name	Species	Origin	Description
Africanis		Southern Africa	Dogs that migrated with Bantu tribes into Southern Africa. The dogs were free to mate amongst themselves without any selective breeding.
Carolina Dog or Yellow Dog		United States	Developed from dogs originally from Asia this landrace has been the basis of the Carolina Dog standardized breed.
Scotch Collie		Scotland	The Rough Collie was bred from the Scotch Collie landrace.
St. John's water dog		Newfoundland, Canada	Served as the foundational stock for a number of purpose-bred dogs, such as the Labrador Retriever, Chesapeake Bay Retriever, Cape Shore Water Dog, and Newfoundland.
Saluki		Fertile Crescent	

==== Goats ====
Some standardized breeds that are derived from landraces include the Dutch Landrace, Swedish Landrace and Finnish Landrace goats. The Danish Landrace is a modern mix of three different breeds, one of which was a "Landrace"-named breed.

Name	Species	Origin	Description
British primitive goat		British Isles	Dates to the Neolithic era and possibly has existed as feral herds continuously since that time.
Icelandic goat		Iceland	Can be dated to the Icelandic Age of Settlement and the population is presumed to have been genetically isolated for nearly the entirety of that time period
Spanish goat		Spain	This landrace survives in larger numbers in the American South as the "brush goat" or "scrub goat", among other names than in Spain.

==== Sheep ====
Name	Species	Origin	Description
Barbados Blackbelly		Barbados	
Icelandic sheep		Iceland	
Shetland sheep		Shetland Isles, Scotland	
Spælsau sheep		Norway	Dates to the Iron Age
Welsh mountain sheep		Wales	

==== Horses ====
The wild progenitor of the domestic horse is extinct. It is rare for landraces among domestic horses to remain isolated, due to human use of horses for transportation, thus causing horses to move from one local population to another.

The heavy 'draft' type of domestic horse, developed in Europe, has differentiated into many separate landraces or breeds. Examples of horse landraces also include insular populations in Greece and Indonesia, and, on a broader scale, New World populations derived from the founder stock of Colonial Spanish horse.

The Yakutian and Mongolian Horses of Asia have "unimproved" characteristics.

Name	Species	Origin	Description
Icelandic horse		Iceland	
Newfoundland pony		Newfoundland	
Shetland pony		Shetland	

==== Pigs ====
The standardized swine breeds named "Landrace" are often not actually landraces or derived from landraces. The Danish Landrace pig breed, pedigreed in 1896 from an actual local landrace, is the principal ancestor of the American Landrace (1930s). In this way, the Swedish Landrace is derived from the Danish and from other Scandinavian breeds, as is the British Landrace breed.

Name	Species	Origin	Description
Baudin pig		Kangaroo Island, South Australia	Once a feral landrace, it is now extinct in the wild.
Mulefoot pig			The Mulefoot pig originated as a landrace, but has been standardized since the early 1900s.
Lindröd pig		Skåne, Sweden	The breed originates from a population at Skånes Djurpark, that was found on Linderödsåsen in the 1950s. It is thought to be the last remaining population of an older breed of pigs kept in the deciduous forests of southern Sweden.

==== Chicken ====
Name	Species	Origin	Description
Danish hen		Denmark	
Icelandic chicken		Iceland	
Jærhøns		Norway	
Swedish flower hen		Sweden	
Shetland hen		Scotland	

==== Ducks ====
Name	Species	Origin	Description
Swedish Blue duck		Sweden	A modern breed of the same name is derived from the landrace.

==== Geese ====
Many standardized goose breeds named "Landrace", e.g. the Twente Landrace goose, are not actually true landraces, but may be derived from them.

Name	Species	Origin	Description
Pilgrim goose		New England	This landrace is associated with the Mayflower Pilgrims of Plymouth Colony, and has also been standardised as a formal breed since 1939. It is thought to descend from western European stock dating of the 17th century.

==== Rabbits ====
Name	Species	Origin	Description
Gotland rabbit		Gotland	This landrace is subject to conservation efforts.
Mellerud rabbit		Sweden	This landrace is subject to conservation efforts.
