= List of Icelandic breeds =

This is a list of the animal breeds of Iceland.

English name	Local name	Notes	Image
Icelandic Cattle	Íslenski nautgripurinn		
Icelandic Chicken	Íslenski hænsnastofninn		
Icelandic Goat	Íslenska geitin		
Icelandic Horse	Íslenski hesturinn		
Icelandic Leadersheep	Forystufé		
Icelandic Pig	Íslenska svínið	extinct	
Icelandic Sheep	Íslenska sauðkindin		
Icelandic Sheepdog	Íslenski fjárhundurinn		
