= Balkan goat =

Domestic goat breed

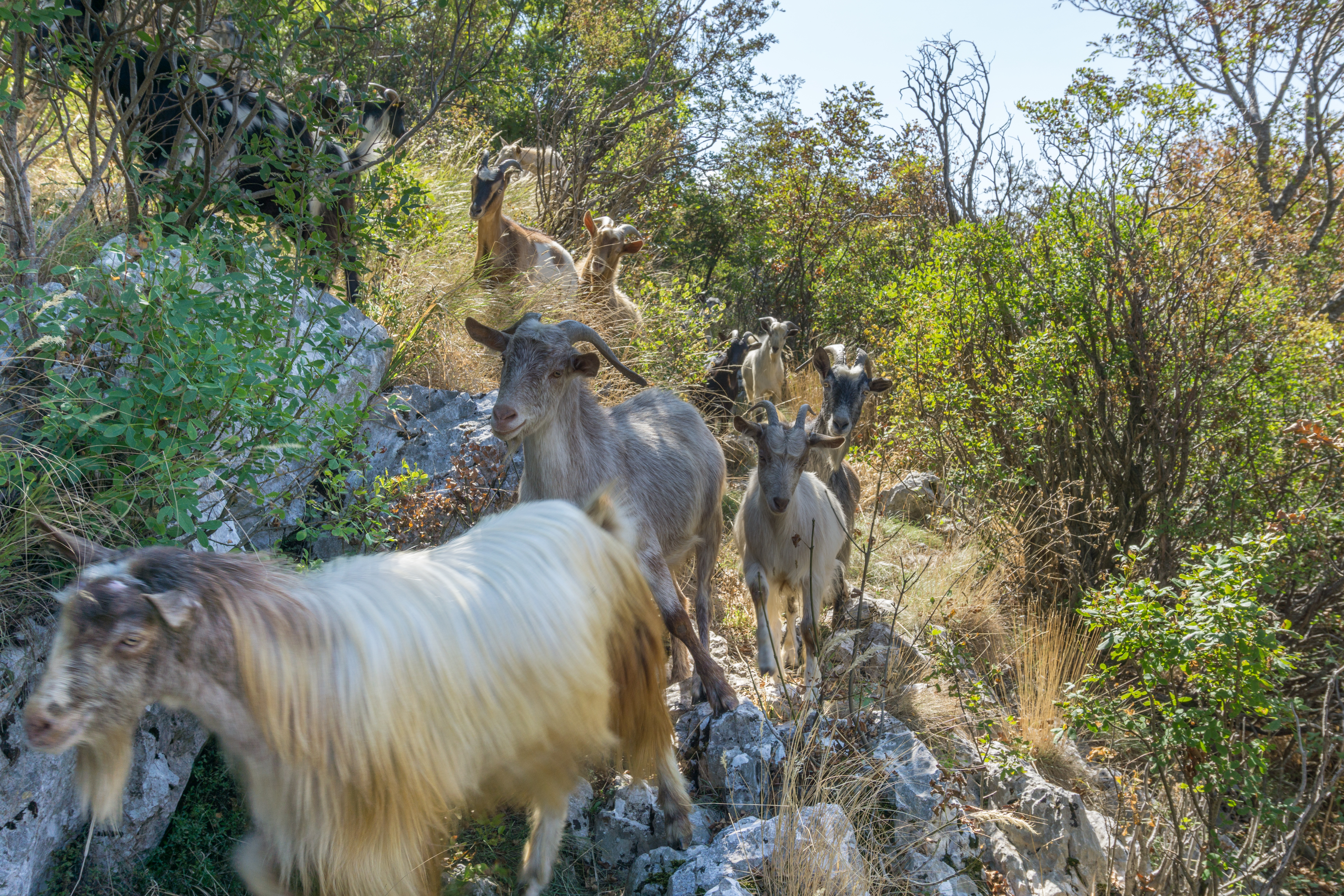
Balkan goats.

The Balkan goat is a domestic autochthonous breed, which originated from wild goats that inhabited the area of the Balkan Peninsula. Different environmental conditions in certain areas of the Balkans influenced the creation of different varieties.

== Characteristics ==
The body of the domestic Balkan goat is overgrown with a medium-long or long shiny coat of different pigmentation (reddish or gray, but can also be black, as well as chestnut, brown, patchy, and white)

The head is of medium length with very mobile ears. Goats are mostly horned (higher terrains), and can be polled (lower terrains). Horns are darkly pigmented, of good strength, rough and lack luster. They grow on the top of the frontal bones, bend backwards, first parallel, and then separate, so that with age the tips move away, and in goats they also twist slightly.

The skeleton is narrow and shallow, the neck is thin and long and the ridge is prominent with a significantly more developed back part of the body. The legs are thin and strong, as are the hooves. The height of the withers is on average 66 cm, and the chest circumference is about 79 cm.

The body weight of the domestic Balkan goat is around 50 kg in today's conditions (selection, nutrition, care).

The udder is soft and elastic, but poorly developed. The average duration of lactation in domestic Balkan goats is about 210 days, and the average milk yield is about 150 kg, with an extremely large range of variation (from 80 to 250 kg). The milkiness of the Balkan goat is relatively weaker compared to noble and even improved transitional breeds. However, compared to local, primitive breeds bred in other parts of Europe or the world, the milk yield of the Balkan goat is within the expected and biological limits for this group of breeds.

It usually starts breeding at 16 to 20 months. Fertility varies from 110 to 130%. The birth weight of kids ranges from 2.5 to 3.0 kg, and at the age of 3 months, with supplementary feeding, they reach a weight of 15 to 18 kg. Kids are marketed with a weight of 18 to 20 kg. The annual production of sacks is around 0.5 kg.

== See also ==
- British Primitive goat
