= Gotland rabbit =

Breed of rabbit

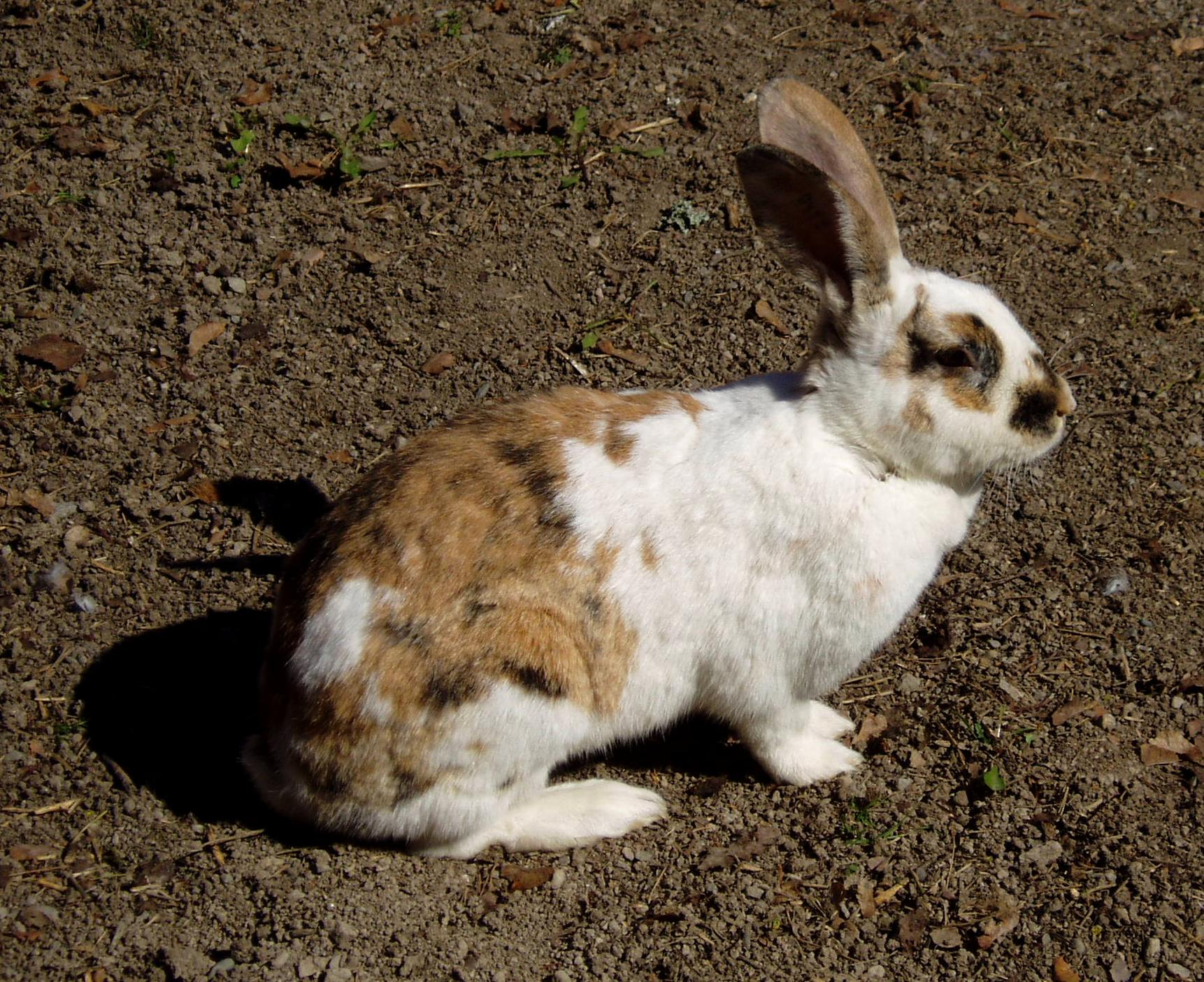
Gotland rabbit

The Gotland rabbit is a Swedish variety of rabbit of medium size that comes in a variety of colours. The Gotland rabbit has official landrace status in Sweden and is considered an endangered variety, but is also being developed as a formal breed under the same name. The landrace is related to the even rarer Mellerud rabbit.

== History ==
Rabbits have been held at farms in Sweden since at least the 1500s, though decreasing in popularity during the 1900s. These rabbits were referred to as "bondkaniner" ("farm rabbits") in as early as 1881 and were kept mainly for their meat and pelts. As a result of this, health, productivity and nursing instincts were considered more important than type and colour, which has traditionally been of higher importance in showing breeds. The Gotland rabbit has therefore managed to retain a large genetic diversity in terms of shape and colour, at the same time maintaining good health and few known genetic illnesses.

As show breeds gained popularity, the farm rabbits became rarer until all but extinct. A few remaining populations were discovered in the 1970s on the island of Gotland.

== As a formal breed ==
The modern Gotland rabbit originates from these populations, the studbook having been closed since a breeding animal inventory was performed in 1993. Despite the landrace's name, the type represented by the Gotland rabbit is not unique to the island of Gotland – rather, these rabbits represent the old type of farm rabbit once found all over Sweden.

Föreningen Gotlandskaninen ('Gotland Rabbit Society') is responsible for the preservation work of the breed. Although many rabbits of unknown heritage may resemble a Gotland rabbit, only rabbits born after parents registered by Föreningen Gotlandskaninen are considered to be purebred Gotlands and may be registered as such. Registered rabbits are maintained in an official gene bank registry.

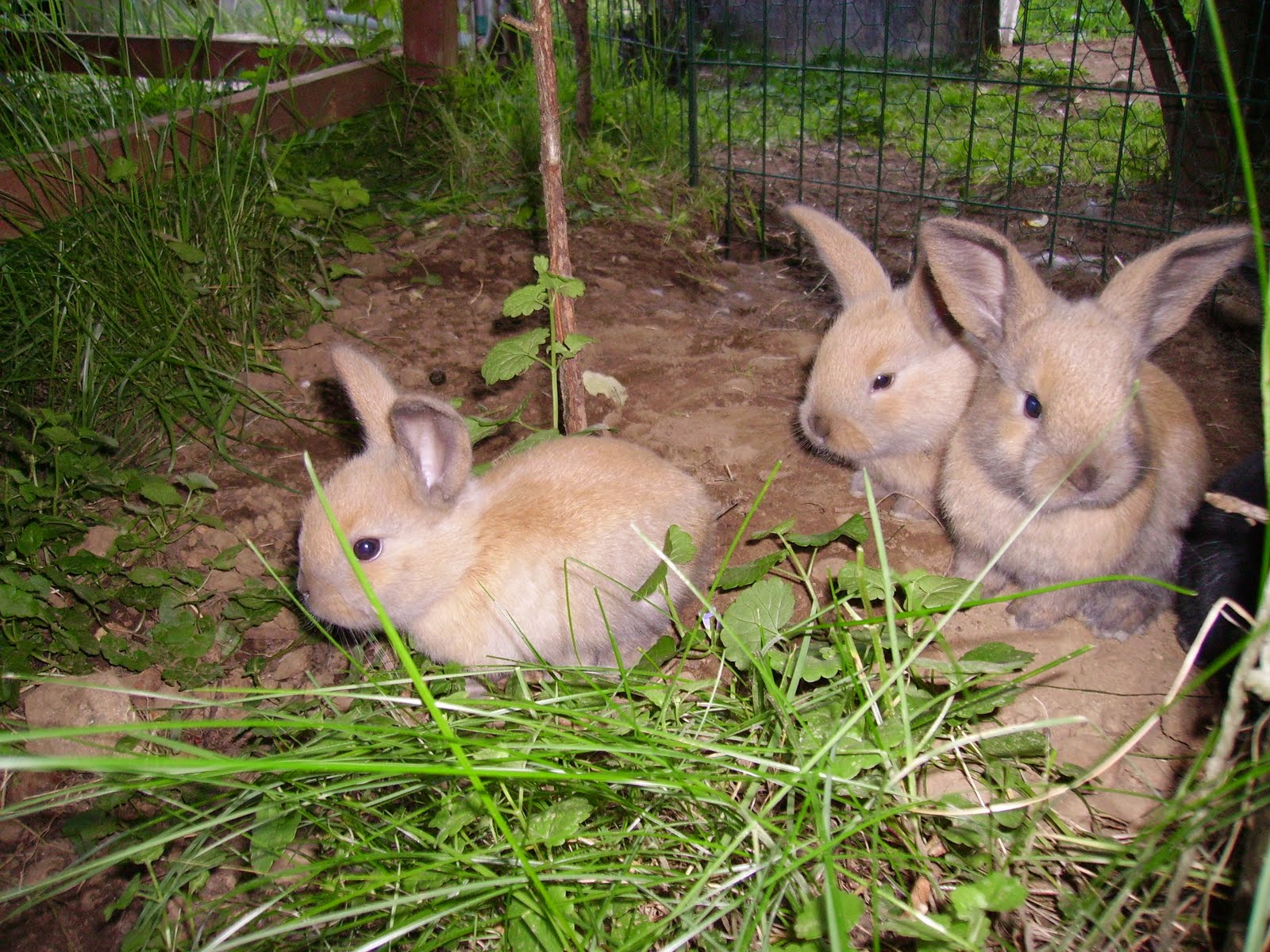
4-week-old Gotland rabbits

== Appearance and personality ==
Despite having never been bred towards a written breed standard until recent times, most Gotland rabbits share a distinctive and recognizable type. The variety is of medium size with an adult weight of 3–4 kg (6.6-8.8 lb). The body of the doe is relatively elongated with a fine head while the buck is usually somewhat more compact with a rounder head and thicker muzzle. There is no weight difference between the sexes. The ears are of medium length and relatively thin, pointed rather than rounded. The eyes are somewhat large with an alert expression. Any eye colour is allowed. The coat is short and fine, usually straight although a few rex coated Gotlands have been known. Any pattern and colour is allowed.

The temperament of the Gotland rabbit is described as lively and curious, with the rabbit often being very interested in its environment. The Gotland is a medium quality producer with an average of 6-8 kits per litter, more rarely 10 or more. The does are usually good mothers that can be very protective of their young. The kits grow relatively slowly compared to modern production breeds, but in return require less feed. The Gotland rabbit is considered a hardy variety that is rarely affected by disease or genetic defects.

== Requirements ==
Gotland rabbits are generally hardy and well adapted to living outdoors year round, provided they are protected against drafts and harsh sunlight.

Gotland rabbit breeders strive to produce animals that can consist on natural types of feed, mainly a good quality hay, which may be replaced with fresh grass and other non-toxic plants during summertime. Traditional rabbit pellets may be too high in calories for landrace rabbits and should be viewed as an occasional treat or fed in only small quantities, rather than a staple. It is important that the rabbit always has access to fresh water.

== See also ==
- List of rabbit breeds
