= Jóhanna Bergmann Þorvaldsdóttir =

Icelandic farmer and conservationist

- Born: Iceland
- Occupations: Icelandic goat farmer Former nurse
- Spouse: Þorbjörn Oddsson
- Children: Six

Jóhanna Bergmann Þorvaldsdóttir is an Icelandic farmer responsible for saving the Icelandic goat through breeding them at her farm, Háafell in Borgarbyggð, Iceland.

== Career ==
Jóhanna Bergmann Þorvaldsdóttir runs the Háafell farm in Borgarbyggð, Iceland. Prior to running the farm, she was a nurse, although it had been her family's farm for three generations. Jóhanna has raised six children on the farm.

Since 2000, she has been breeding the Icelandic goat in an effort to save it from extinction. Through her work, the farm has also become known as the Icelandic Goat Conservation Center, and is the only goat breeding farm in Iceland. To fund the ongoing work, she organised a crowd funding campaign on Kickstarter in 2012 in order to expand the facilities available at the farm. Jóhanna provided 20 goats to the production of the Game of Thrones fourth season episode "The Laws of Gods and Men". Over time, Jóhanna has created a market for goat products within Iceland.

In 2014, the farm was threatened with foreclosure. In response, Jóhanna organised a further campaign, this time on IndieGoGo, to raise the 10 million Icelandic krona needed to keep the farm open. By the time of the campaign, the numbers of the Icelandic goat had increased from 90 to around 820, with half located on Jóhanna's farm. If the funding was not found, it would have resulted in the goats being slaughtered. After the success of the campaign, Jóhanna has looked to making the farm self sufficient by producing her own goat cheese year round.
