= Sierra Mixe corn =

Nitrogen-fixing landrace of maize

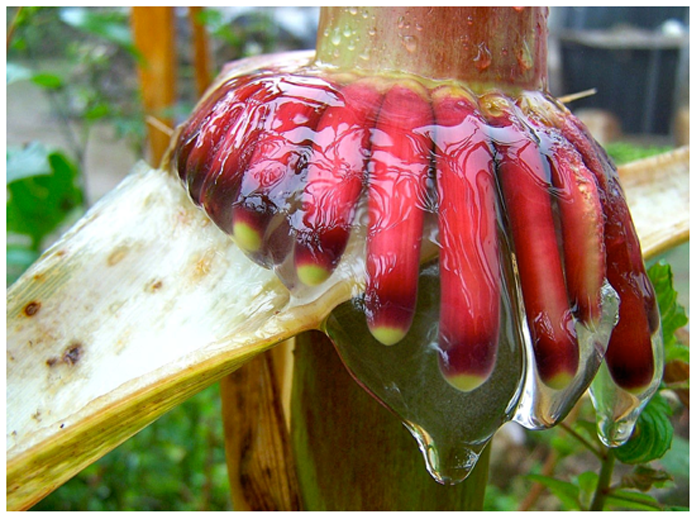
The aerial roots secrete mucilage, which supports nitrogen-fixing bacteria.

Sierra Mixe corn is a traditional variety of maize grown in the Sierra Mixe region of Mexico, especially the town of Totontepec Villa de Morelos. It is known locally as olotón and has been grown by indigenous farmers for thousands of years.

This variety grows unusually tall—up to 4.9 metres—and has aerial roots that secrete a mucilage that drips around the plant. This secretion supports the growth of symbiotic bacteria that fix nitrogen and so fertilize the plant.

There is commercial and scientific interest in this variety, and its genetics are being researched to develop other self-fertilizing varieties that would reduce or eliminate the need for other fertilizers. A team at University of California, Davis is working on this under the auspices of the Nagoya Protocol, which aims to encourage equitable sharing of the benefits of such biodiversity.
