= Mellerud rabbit =

Breed of rabbit

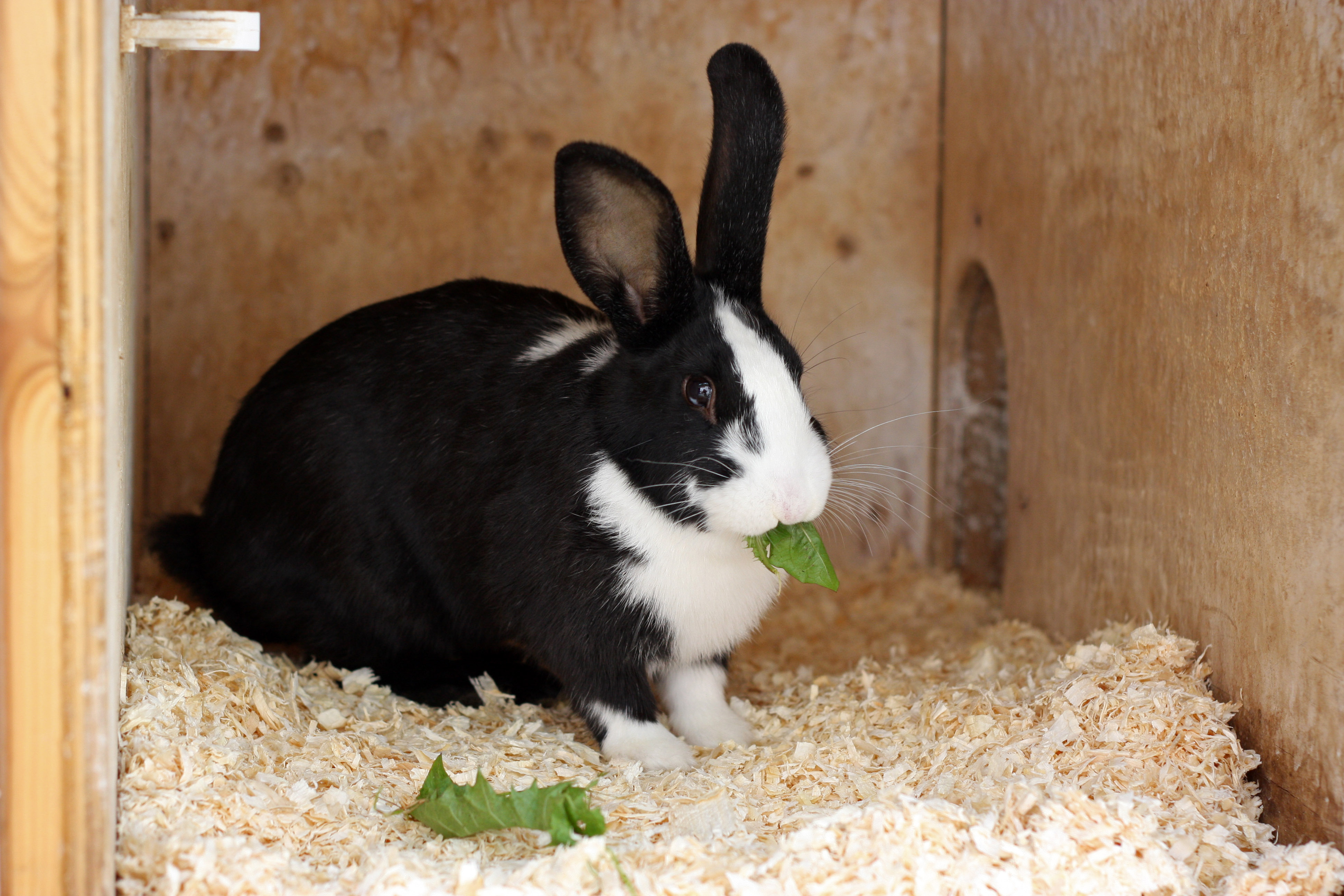
Young Mellerud rabbit

The Mellerud rabbit is a Swedish variety of rabbit of medium size that comes in albino or black with white markings. The Mellerud rabbit has official landrace status in Sweden and is considered a critically endangered variety.

== History ==
The Mellerud rabbit shares part of its history with the better-known Gotland rabbit. Both landraces originated from old lines of farm rabbits that were once common all over Sweden. These rabbits were referred to as bondkaniner ('farm-rabbits') in as early as 1881 and were kept mainly for their meat and pelts. In the 1900s farm rabbits disappeared from most parts of the country and were largely believed to be extinct.

In the late 1990s, a few rabbits of the old farm type were discovered in the care of an older woman, referred to as "Edith i Sjöskogen", living in Mellerud. She has kept rabbits since at least 1937, though the line was believed to be older still. The only known outcrossing to another population had been done in 1968, when two black and white rabbits, one buck and one doe, were added to the group. The population had earlier consisted of 15-20 animals on average, decreasing to lower numbers in recent years. A total of 7 animals were acquired from Edith in the early 2000s, providing the foundation animals for a breeding project to preserve the line. The Mellerud rabbit received official landrace status by Jordbruksverket in 2011.

Föreningen Gotlandskaninen ('Gotland Rabbit Society') is responsible for the preservation work of the Mellerud rabbit along with the Gotland rabbit. Registered rabbits are maintained in an official gene bank registry. As of 2013, approximately 160 registered Mellerud rabbits are registered with the Society and breeders aim to produce a higher number of animals to ensure high genetic diversity.

== Appearance and personality ==
The Mellerud rabbit is similar to the Gotland rabbit in terms of conformation. It is a medium-sized rabbit with an adult weight of 3–3.5 kg (6.6-7.7 lbs). The body of the doe is relatively elongated with a fine head while the buck is usually somewhat more compact with a rounder head and thicker muzzle. There is no weight difference between the sexes. The ears are of medium length and relatively thin, pointed rather than rounded. The eyes are somewhat large with an alert expression. The eyes are brown, blue or a mixture of the two.

The coat is short and fine. The colour is either albino or black with white spotting, referred to as Dutch markings. Because breeders have never strived to standardise the markings in the variety, there is a higher degree of variation in the white markings than in most traditional show breeds. Most Melleruds exhibit white muzzles, blazes to varying degrees, white front of chest and white frontpaws. The white may also extend to and include the sides of the face, the shoulders, the back and/or the hind legs.

The temperament of the Mellered rabbit is described as lively and curious. The Mellerud is often considered to be somewhat calmer than the Gotland rabbit, and also tends to produce somewhat smaller litters on average. The kits grow relatively slowly compared to modern production breeds, but in return require less feed. The landrace is considered hardy and few genetic defects are known.

== Requirements ==
Mellerud rabbits are generally hardy and well adapted to living outdoors year round, provided they are protected against drafts and harsh sunlight.

Mellerud rabbit breeders strive to produce animals that can consist on natural types of feed, mainly a good quality hay, which may be replaced with fresh grass and other non-toxic plants during summertime. Traditional rabbit pellets may be too high in calories for landrace rabbits and should be viewed as an occasional treat or fed in only small quantities, rather than a staple. It is important that the rabbit always has access to fresh water.

== See also ==
- List of rabbit breeds
