= Swedish Flower Hen =

Swedish breed of chicken

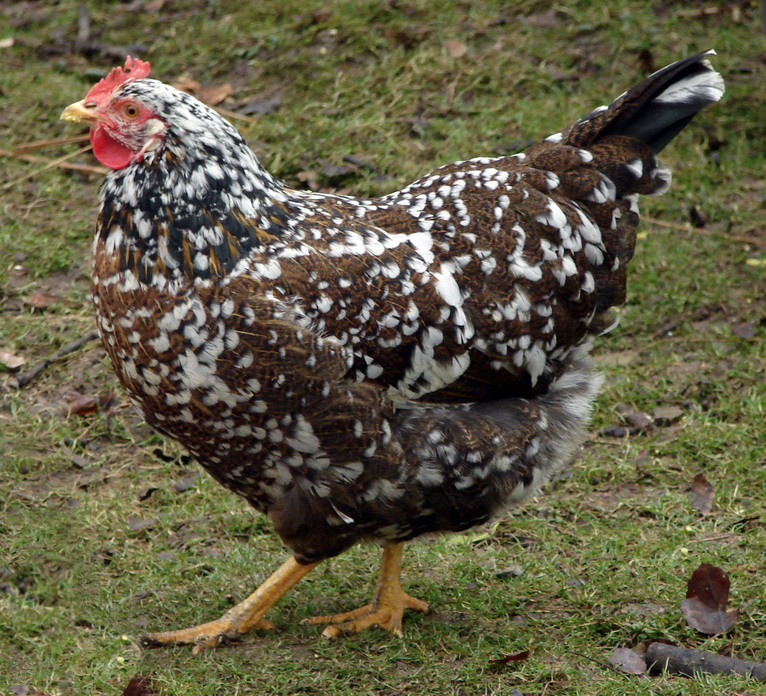
- Hen
- Conservation status: FAO (2007): endangered-maintained; DAD-IS (2022): at risk/endangered
- Other names: Swedish: Skånsk Blommehöna
- Country of origin: Sweden
- Use: eggs, meat

Traits
- Weight: Male: 3 kg; Female: 2.5 kg
- Egg colour: tinted

Classification
- APA: no
- EE: no
- PCGB: no
- Chicken; Gallus gallus domesticus

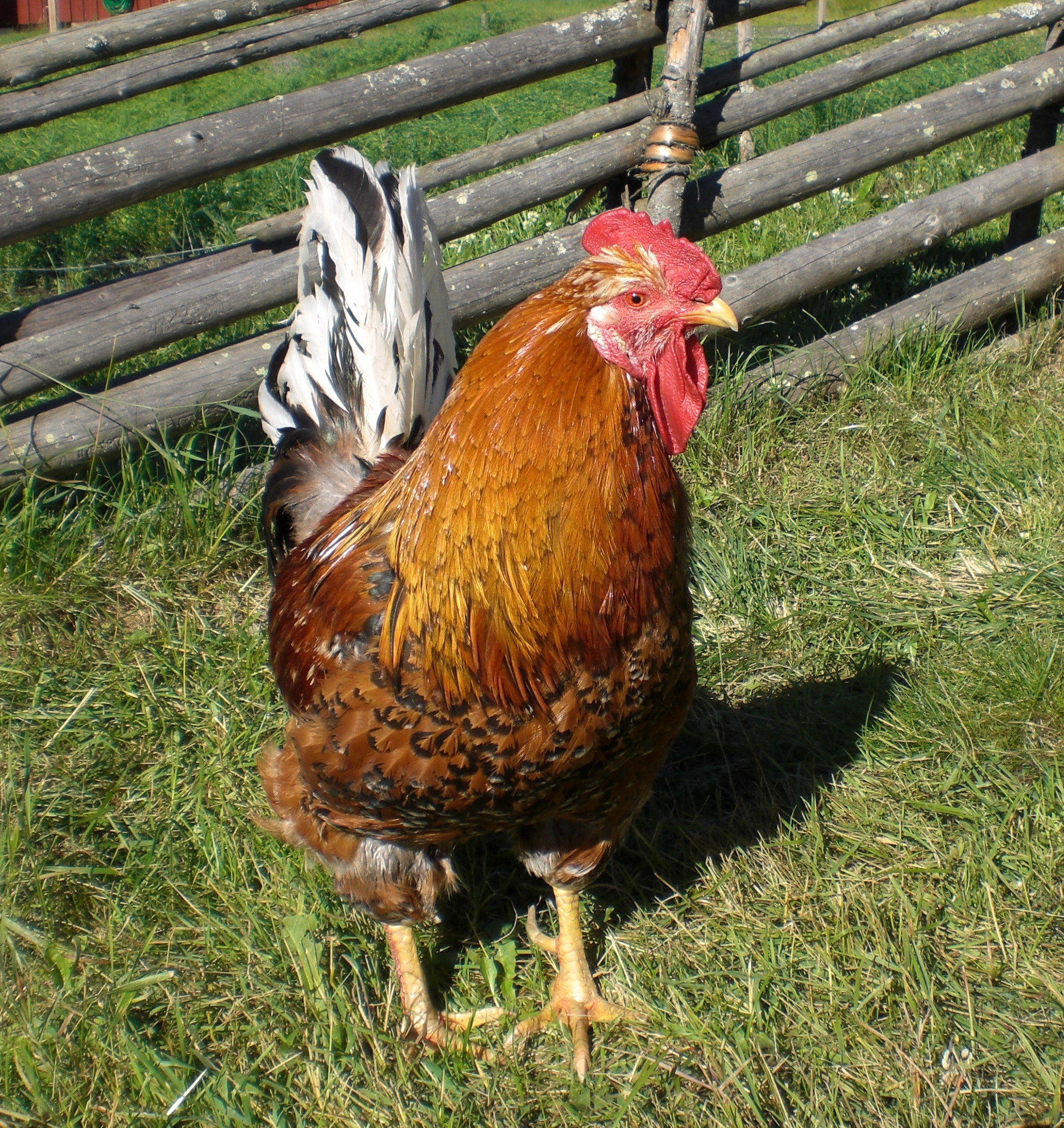
Cock bird at Gammlia, Umeå

The Swedish Flower Hen, Swedish: Skånsk Blommehöna, is an endangered traditional Swedish breed of domestic chicken. It is one of eleven traditional chicken breeds in Sweden.

== History ==
The Blommehöna is a traditional farmyard breed of chicken from southern Sweden; the Swedish name indicates that it comes from the landskap of Skåne. It came close to extinction in the 1970s; recovery was based on three flocks found in the villages of Esarp, Tofta and Vomb, all in Skåne. A breeders' association, the Svenska Lanthönsklubben, was formed. In 2014 a total population of 1592 was reported to the DAD-IS database of the FAO; in 2019 there were a total of 1123, distributed in 85 flocks. In 2022 the conservation status of the breed was listed as 'at risk/endangered'.

Fifteen birds were exported to the United States in 2010.

== Characteristics ==
The Blommehöna is characterised by its millefleur plumage pattern. The base colour is variable, and may be black, blue, buff or red.
