= British Primitive goat =

Type of domestic goat

British Primitive
- Country of origin: United Kingdom

Traits
- Goat; Capra aegagrus hircus

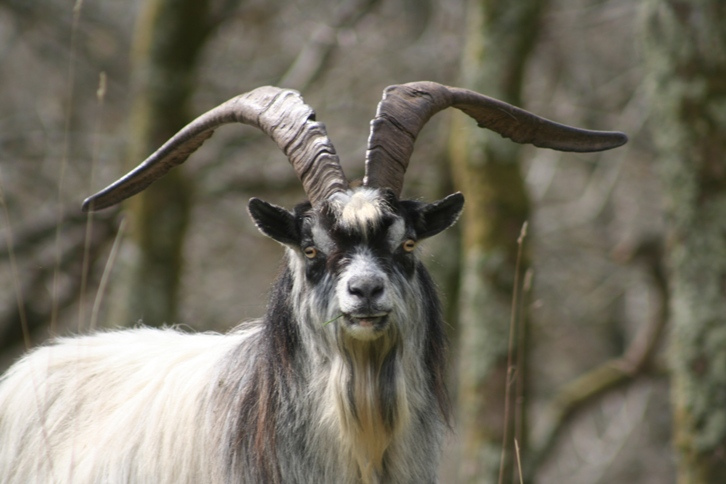
Feral goat, near Llanfair, Gwynedd, 2010

The British primitive goat is a landrace of domestic goat native to Great Britain and Ireland, and is the original goat of the region. It is considered a rare breed, existing as several, isolated feral herds, as some captive populations in zoological parks and nature reserves, and breeding stock on some private farms operated by groups of rare-breed enthusiasts. As few as 1,200 individual British primitives may remain. The variety is also referred to as the British native goat, the old British goat, the old English goat or the British landrace goat, among more specific names (English, Irish, Scottish or Scotch, and Welsh primitive or landrace goat, etc.) It descends from the earliest goats brought to the region in the Neolithic era, around 3,000 BCE. It is classified in the Northern breed group of goats. A population in Northumberland is sometimes referred to as the Cheviot goat. The British primitive is among the foundation stock of some modern standardised breeds, including the Anglo-Nubian goat. The breed is comparatively small, with commensurately low milk production. It is hardy and wiry haired, adapted to rough terrain and weather, and able to subsist and breed on its own without human intervention.

== History ==
The British primitive goat encompasses what were previously considered four interbreeding landrace varieties:

- English primitive, English landrace, or old English goat
- Irish primitive, Irish landrace, or old Irish goat
- Scottish primitive, Scottish landrace, old Scottish, or old Scotch goat
- Welsh primitive, Welsh landrace, or old Welsh goat

Their characteristics were similar enough to classify them together, though some sources have treated them separately, such as the UN Food and Agriculture Organization, which considers some of these strains extinct.

The British primitive goat descends from goats introduced around 5,000 years ago, along with some sheep and cattle, to the British Isles by the first farmers in the Neolithic period, the era of Stonehenge. A small, all-weather animal, it provided these subsistence pastoralists some milk, and was invaluable for its meat, skin, hair and tallow. The ancestral goats were common to the Celtic and Germanic peoples of Northern Europe. It survived through the Bronze and Iron Ages, as it was hardy and self-sufficient in foraging in a rough, nutritionally poor environment, required little intervention from humans, and was good at evading predators. The British population of this livestock crossed cultural lines again later, during successive settlement by the Anglo-Saxons and by the Vikings. During the Medieval period it was the herding goat of the manor, and the basis of the Cheddar cheese industry.

Until the late 18th century, there were at least one million British primitives in Scotland and Northern England, and half a million in Ireland. It was the only variety of goat established in the British Isles up until that era. The native goat became less and less popular as agricultural practices shifted, because of their small size, coarse hair, and large horns. By the time of the 1870s resurgence in goat-keeping, foreign hornless breeds from India, the Middle East, and Switzerland began to dominate, with shorter, smoother coats, and greater milk production, forming the basis of the modern, standardised breeds of the British Isles.

== In the United Kingdom ==
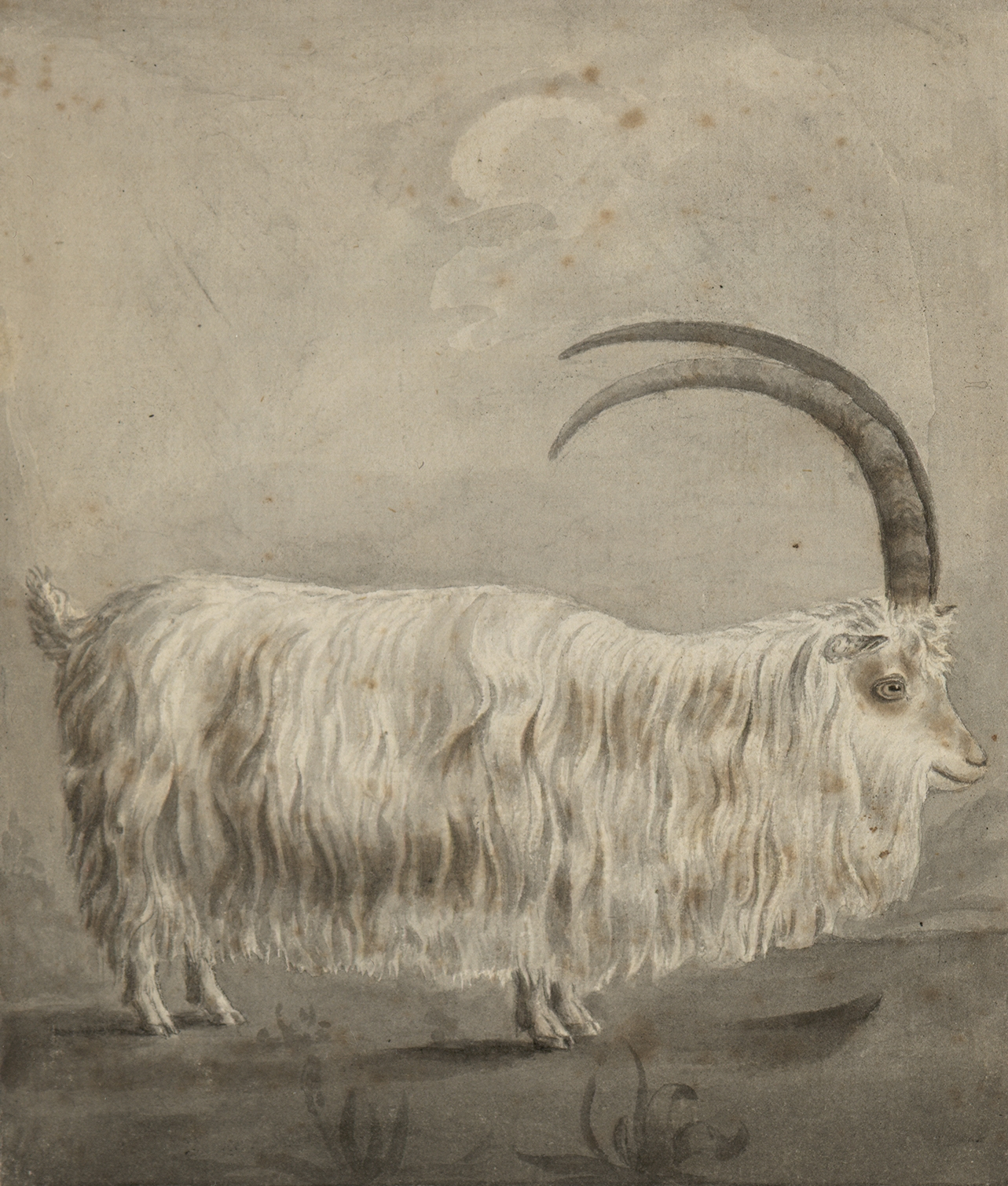
A wild Welsh Goat sketched c.1780

The primitive variety would have become extinct in the UK had some not escaped or been turned loose to form feral populations. Due to both displacement by non-indigenous goats and conversion of hilltop grazing land into softwood plantations, these feral herds have long been in decline. By the 1950s, 60 of the 233 known locations of herd no longer supported feral goats. Many were killed off, as plantations of softwood were developed on upland areas that had been hill farms. By the 1990s, the number of herds had diminished even more, as only 45 then survived, with a total population of around 4,000 goats. These numbers have been reduced further by more recent large-scale culls of as many as 1,200 goats at a time. Some farm groups and zoos have created projects to help preserve a viable population of the British primitive.

The independent British Feral Goat Research Group estimates that because of introgression (repeated cross-breeding) with modern breeds of foreign stock, perhaps only 1,500 non-mixed British primitive goats remain in Great Britain, making it a rare breed. The group has called for "urgent action ... to protect, preserve and promote what is rapidly becoming a remnant" of what was once the dominant variety of goat in the region. The group says it has been successful in convincing both the Windsor Great Park and Battersea Park Zoo to maintain populations of the British primitive. Another population, in multiple herds, is kept at Galloway Forest Park.

Today, feral herds exist in Northumberland, Snowdonia, and the Black Mountains, as well as on Lundy Island. There are smaller groups in Somerset and on the Isle of Wight. Scotland has a larger population, most of them deep in the Highlands. In 2018 goats were introduced to the Verne Common nature reserve on the Isle of Portland, to control scrub.

Despite some conservationist concerns with regard to uncontrolled goat grazing, the Royal Society for the Protection of Birds itself maintains a small herd of the goats at Inversnaid, Scotland, and at least three other nature reserves, at Mull of Kintyre, Colonsay, and Grey Mare's Tail have herds as well.

=== Cheviot goat ===
The population of the Cheviot Hills in Northumberland is referred to as the Cheviot goat, and is believed to have been feral since at least the Iron Age, possibly even the Neolithic. It has come into some conflict with both wildlife conservationists and local farmers, and as of 2011 became the subject of a GPS radio-collar tracking programme, to identify the exact extent of its moorland range and foraging behavior, for future management efforts. The goats have no legal protection, and may be disposed of by landowners. "This poses a real threat to this small, genetically unique population", according to Richard Bevan, co-director of the project.

== In Ireland ==
The Old Irish goat is the original and only landrace breed of goat in Ireland. Having arrived in the Mesolithic period, the breed adapted to landscape as a cold-weather goat and became an integral part of Ireland's living heritage. Being a low maintenance, small holder's goat, it supported entire village communities throughout Ireland's impoverished pastoral history and as such, is celebrated in Irish tradition, paintings, photography and literature The Old Irish Goat is critically endangered as a consequence of changes in agricultural practises, cross breeding with modern improved goats, casual hunting and indiscriminate culls.

The Old Irish landrace goat is present in the Burren mountains, although fewer than 10% of the remaining feral herd (an estimated 250) is believed to be purebred, due to crossbreeding with Anglo-Nubian and Swiss imports. Recent DNA profiling has verified that this population is genetically distinct from other strains of goat. The population, however, has not to date received official designation or protection.

During the Great Famine, many were let loose and became feral because people could not feed them. After the famine years, many of the goats were captured and herded into mountains by the landlords.

There is an annual fair in Killorglin, County Kerry, Ireland, called the Puck Fair. It is an event lasting two days, in which (among other festivities) people capture a feral goat and put it on a stand in the town square, calling the animal as "King Puck", the honorary master of ceremonies. In pagan Ireland, the goat was sacrificed, though today it is let loose, at the end of the fair.

== Characteristics ==
The typical British primitive is deep bodied, with a square frame and broad shoulders and back. Its legs are shorter than its body depth, and have been observed to be bony, short, and straight. The goat normally has a long body and a neck that is frequently thick and short, a rounded belly and loins that are broad and deep. The breast bone is always projected forward.

A British primitive's head tapers towards a fine muzzle, and contains a prominent frontal bone with a broad forehead. A concave face appears to be due to a dip or stop at the point where the forehead meets the face. The goat's ears are usually round, small, and upright. A buck's ears are smaller than those of a doe. Due to horn growth, the ears may be directed forwards. The beard of the British primitive is a key feature of the breed in both sexes and is always present.

These goats have observed to be relatively small, with bucks possessing an average height 24 to 27 inches (61 to 69 cm) at the withers, while does are 22 to 24 inches (56 to 61 cm). Bucks and does frequently weigh around 100–120 pounds (45–54 kg). Regional differences in size may occur.

British primitive goats are a long-haired variety. The buck's hair is normally uniform, whereas the doe's hair may vary between thick and dense. The goat's hair is never smooth or glossy. The buck's coat is long to very long, blending with the beard and creating a fringe. A doe's hair varies and can go from thick and dense to very thick, with occasional longer fringes of hair down the spine and around the flanks. During winter, the hair of the goat is much thicker and denser, due to the compact under-wool of cashmere. The cashmere often pushes the outer coat upwards and out, giving the goat a bulky look.

The horns of a British primitive normally form a "scimitar" or "dorcas" twist. The horns emerge high and parallel with the line of the forehead. The horns are thick at the base, and are often wide apart. A doe's horns range from scimitar to twisted, but are normally smaller and thinner. Individuals of the breed are sometimes naturally polled (hornless), but it is not a very common characteristic.

Common colour patterns in British primitives include white, tan, wild patterning, badger-face, grey, light-belly, black, red cheek, mahogany, and face mask. Reverse stripes, belts, and spotting (pied) are also present in these goats.

British primitive goats rut between August and December. The gestation period is 150 days. Up to one third of the kids die within the first few days from predation by foxes, large birds like crows, and birds of prey.

== Cross-breeding ==
Aside from feral populations cross-breeding on their own with imported goat breeds, British primitives have been used in selective, intentional crossbreeding of livestock by humans.

The old English strain in particular is among the foundation stock of some modern standardised breeds. For example, the popular Anglo-Nubian goat originated in England in the 1920s–1930s, as a cross between old English milch goats.

On farms it is very common to use artifice, such as artificial insemination, to obtain a herd with the fewest physiologically deficient individuals. With this artificial selection it is possible to obtain a more disease-resistant and size bearing offspring that makes the commercialization of goat derivatives viable.

Artificial insemination or Intrauterine insemination is a medically assisted reproduction technique consisting of artificial deposition of semen in the female's genital tract. It is used in cases where the spermatozoa can not reach the fallopian tubes or simply by choice of the owner of the animal. It consists of transferring, to the uterine cavity, spermatozoa previously collected and processed, with the selection of morphologically more normal and mobile spermatozoa.

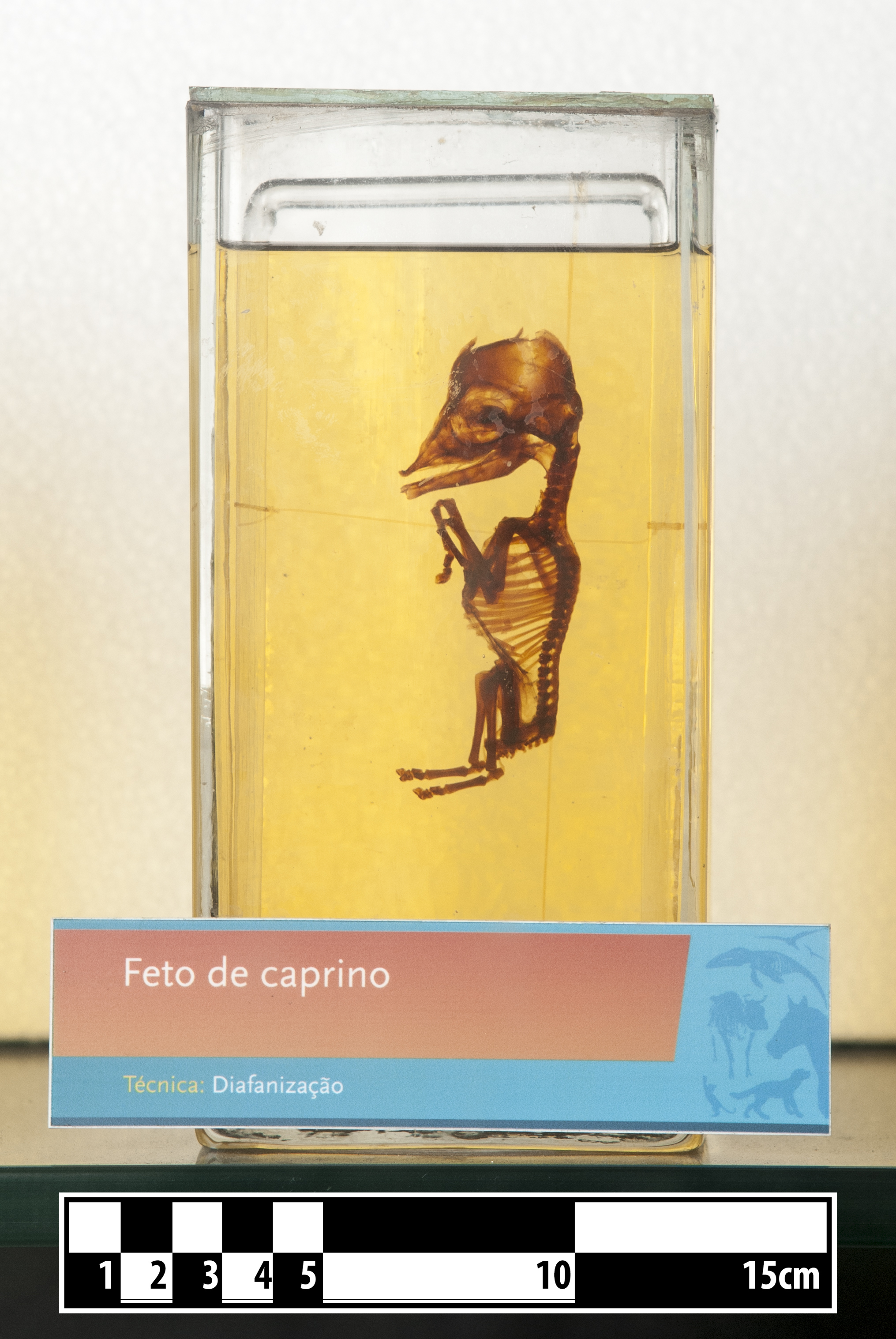
Goat fetus.

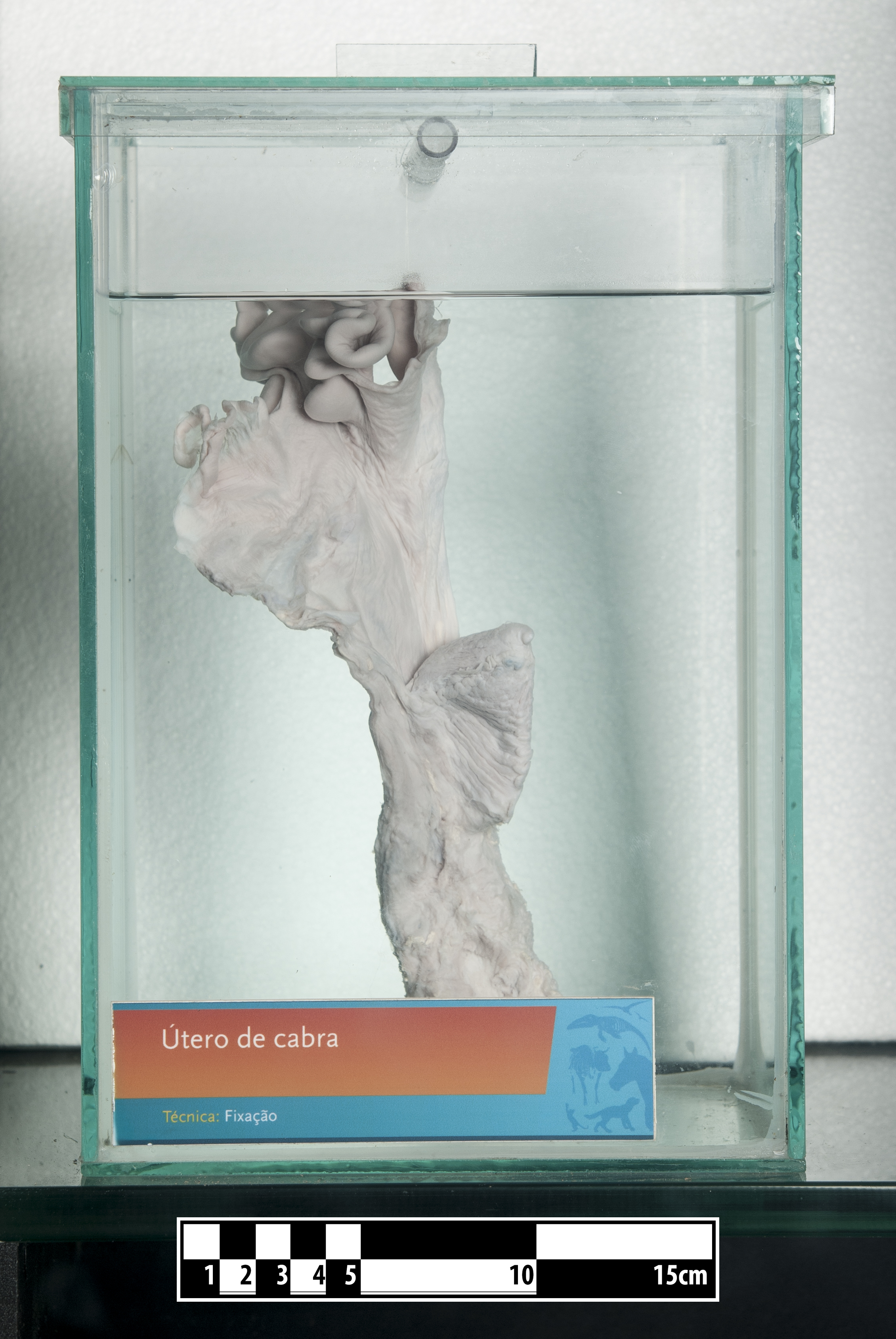
Goat uterus.

== See also ==
- Goat racing
