= Icelandic chicken =

Icelandic breed of chicken

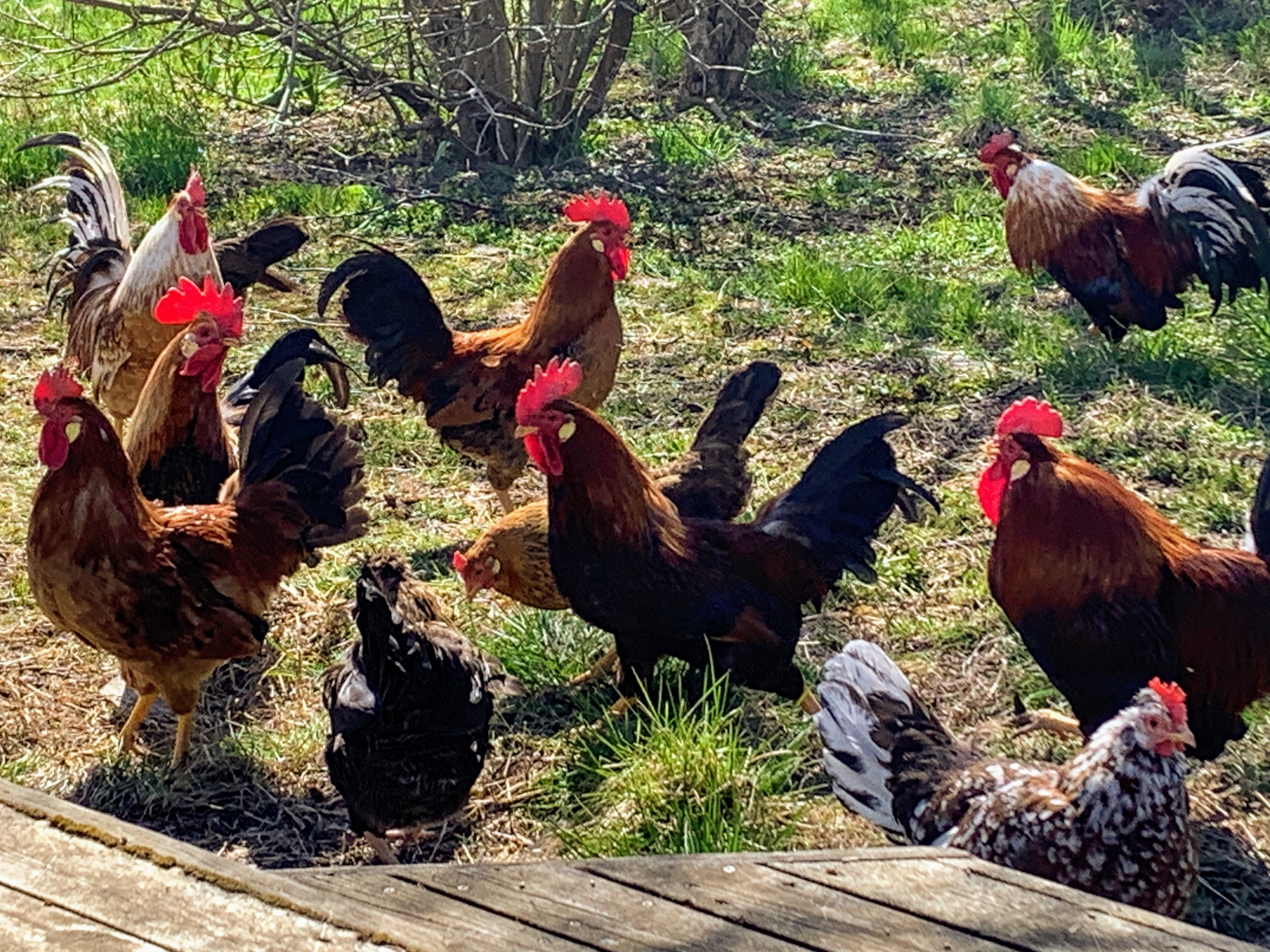
- A flock of Icelandic settler roosters and hens
- Country of origin: Iceland

Traits
- Skin color: Yellow
- Egg color: White to pale tan
- Comb type: Variations of rose, straight, pea and combinations

Classification

The Icelandic chicken is the chicken breed of Iceland. Called íslenska hænan (Icelandic pronunciation: [ˈistlɛnska ˈhaiːnan], Icelandic chicken), Haughænsni ([ˈhœyɣˌhainstnɪ], pile chicken) or landnámshænan ([ˈlantˌnaumsˌhaiːnan], hen of the settlers) in the Icelandic language. They are a landrace fowl which are rare outside their native country. They have been present on the island since introduction by Norse settlers in the 9th century.

== Characteristics ==
Icelandic chickens are adaptable and resistant to harsh climates, even able to thrive in backyard conditions. The breed can be very trusting of humans if raised with respect and a calm demeanor. Although the Icelandic chicken is not a dual purpose breed, it is able to lay large amounts of medium-sized eggs ranging from white to pale tan. Icelandic chickens are also known to produce eggs during winter months and throughout their longer lifetimes. Icelandic hens have been shown to become "broody" when they lay eggs, and serve as excellent mothers when their young hatch. Icelandic chickens are medium-sized and have a small carcass weight. (For example, a five month old cockerel would weigh 2.5 pounds).

== Behaviour and safety ==
Icelandic chickens are alert and able to react quickly, but are commonly prey to dogs, hawks, and other predators. As such, the breed requires a strong coop during the night, and good fencing and/or a livestock guard dog. Icelandic chickens enjoy foraging, sometimes dig into manure and compost piles. They are also excellent fliers, using their flight capabilities to roost in high places during the night.

== Appearance and breed standards ==
Icelandic chickens are not standardized in appearance, possess a wide range of plumage colors and patterns, and comb types. Some have feather crests. The Eigenda- og ræktendafélag landnámshænsna (ERL) or The Owners and Breeders Association of Landnámshænan in Iceland, has written a description of the landrace. Being a landrace, and capable of evolving to conditions it lives in, it cannot have a Standard of Perfection that a Breed has. Unlike a modern chicken breed that commonly has an inbred factor of 12%, Icelandics have proven by DNA analysis to be remarkably genetically diverse.
