= Danish hen =

Breed of chicken

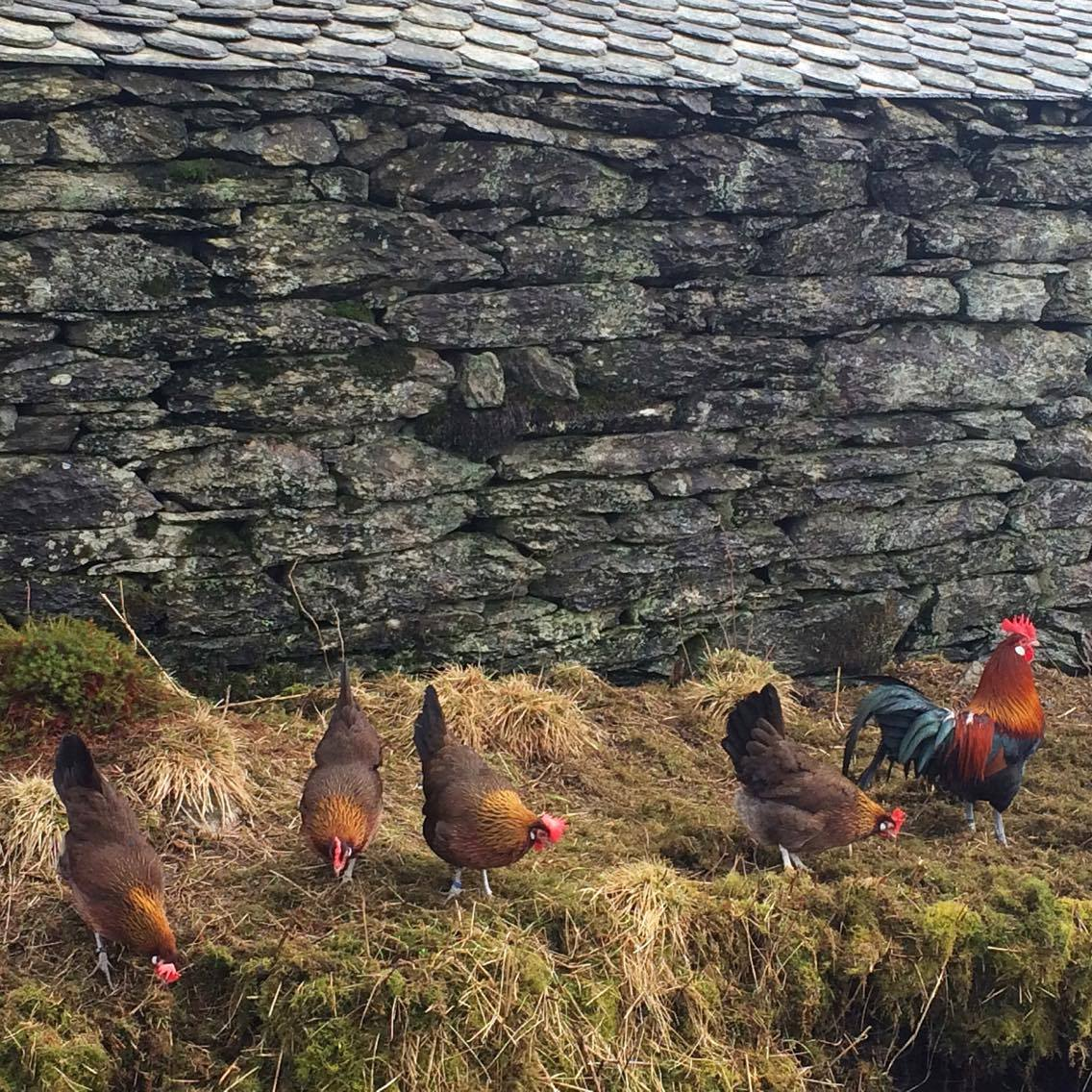
Danish hens, four hens and a cock.

The Danish hen (Danish: Dansk landhøne) is a traditional Danish breed of chicken. It is the only indigenous chicken breed of Denmark.

== History ==
Archaeological remains have revealed that the particular breed of the Danish hen has been kept as livestock poultry in the area we now know as Denmark for more than 2000 years. It is believed that chickens were introduced to the Scandinavian region by germanic tribes from the south around 400 BC.

In the beginning of the 1800s, various foreign poultry and livestock breeds were introduced in Danish agriculture on a broad scale and the Danish hen was disfavoured and often interbred. The Danish hen was in danger of extinction, but in the years 1877–78, a few dedicated and foresighted farmers bought and collected whatever they could get of Danish hens with a provable genetic ancestry. In 1878, the association of Landhønseringen was initiated with teacher N. Jensen Badskær as chairman, and in 1901 the first standard of the Danish hen breed emerged. The Danish hen plays no economic or productional role at all and is exclusively kept by hobby breeders. The association of Specialklubben for Danske Landhøns is now officially working for mediating and preserving knowledge about this particular breed.

== Description ==
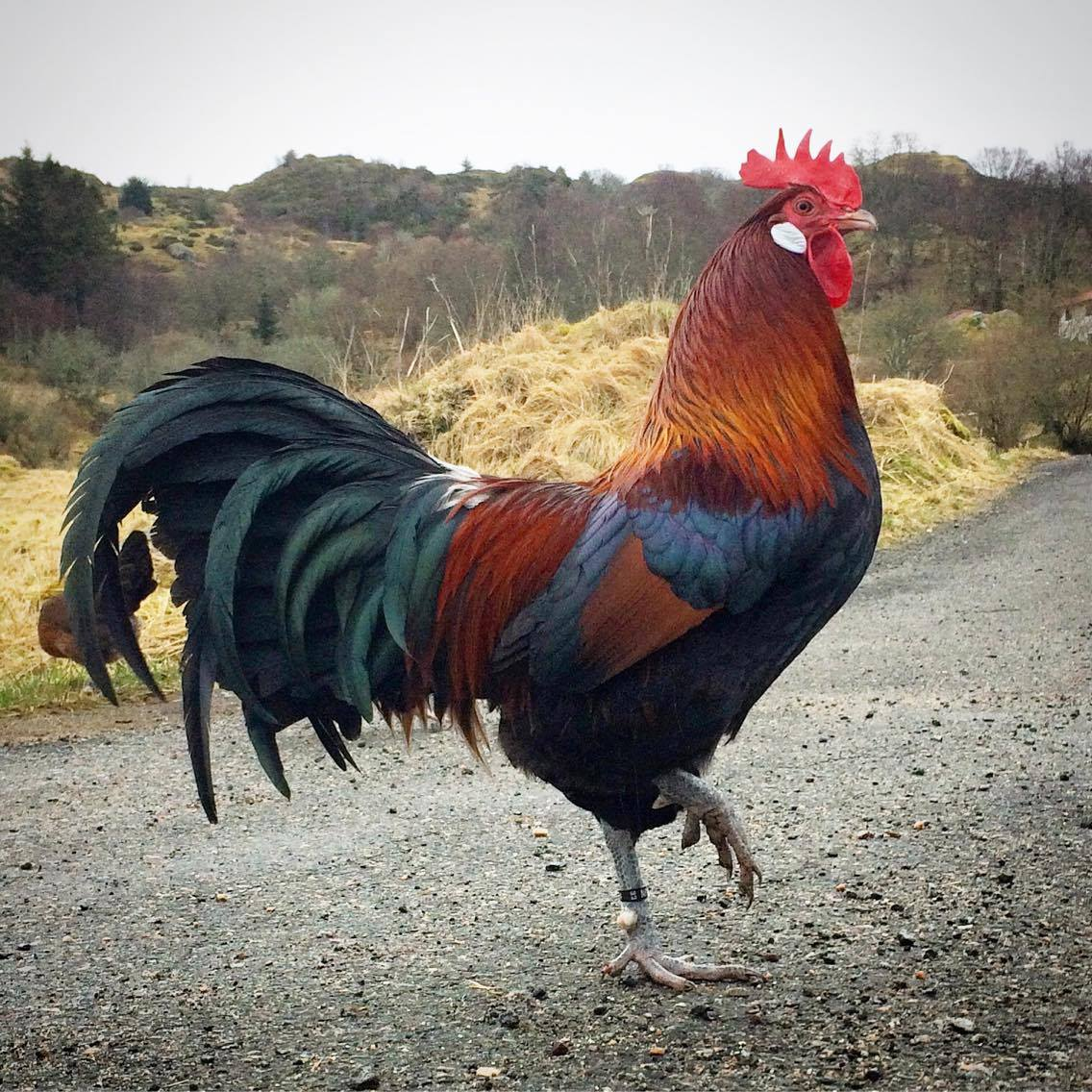
Cock.

The Danish hen is a somewhat small breed. They are sturdy, fastgrowing and have a good resistance to disease. The foodstuff consumption is small and they are eager at seeking out food on their own. The female hen has a well-developed and plump rear and is an excellent egg layer of white eggs (55-65 g), except during the winter. Danish hens are lively by nature and with a tendency for flight-lust. Warm springs (by Danish standards) are needed for proper egg hatching, but the hens are good chicken leaders. The average weight of fully grown cocks and hens are 2–2.50 kg and 1.75 kg respectively. The carcass is not abundant with meat, but the chest is fleshy, the meat has a fine structure and the taste is considered exquisite.

=== Genetic variations ===
There are several colour variations of Danish hens, with brown as the most numerous, followed by black. Other colours include yellow, white, grey and silver neck.

There is also a distinct short-legged variation of The Danish hen called Luttehøns within the species. Luttehøns has a predisposition for very short legs of only a few centimetres, while the claws are of ordinary size and capability. Luttehøns are calmer in nature, with less lust for flight. They tend to be slightly heavier, with an average weight of 2.25 kg and 2.00 kg for the cock and hen respectively, and the eggs weigh a minimum of 58 g. There is no lethal alleles when Luttehøns and ordinary long-legged Danish hens are crossed.

A native genetic variation of dwarf hens has existed in Denmark since ancient times, but it proved hard to secure an original strain and it was not until 1952 that a plan for back-breeding a dwarf strain was launched officially by the association of Landhønseringen. The first results of this plan emerged in 1967. The origin of the original Danish dwarf hen is unknown. Back-breeding attempts has focused on a bantamising of the ordinary Danish chicken. Therefore, ordinary Danish hens are sometimes referred to as large Danish hens to separate them from the dwarf variation. The current strain of dwarf Danish hens is perhaps mixed with dwarf hens from Germany.

A successful variation of dwarf Luttehøns has been bred from the large Danish hen in Denmark, with considerable progress in the years 1945–1950. It is a very trustful bird with a compact and firm body. The eggs are white and a minimum weight of 30 g for hatching eggs is required. The cocks weigh 800 g and the hens 700 g on average. A brown and a black strain exists.

Gumpehøne is a variant of the Danish chicken, characterized by an inferior tail due to a few missing tail joints. Only a few individuals exists.

== Conservation status ==
At the end of the 1900s, the Danish hen was rare, but as it has gained in popularity among amateur breeders, it is no longer considered endangered. The luttehøns variation is not as well-known and popular as ordinary Danish hens, it has been very close to extinction and is still critically endangered.

== Sources ==
- Danske Land Høns/Chicken/Denmark European Farm Animal Biodiversity Information System (EFABIS)
- Specialklubben for Danske Landhøns Official homepage for the breeders club in Denmark (in Danish)
- Danmarks Fjerkræavlerforening For Raceavl (DFfR) Official homepage for poultry breeders in Denmark (in Danish)
