= Icelandic cattle =

Breed of cattle

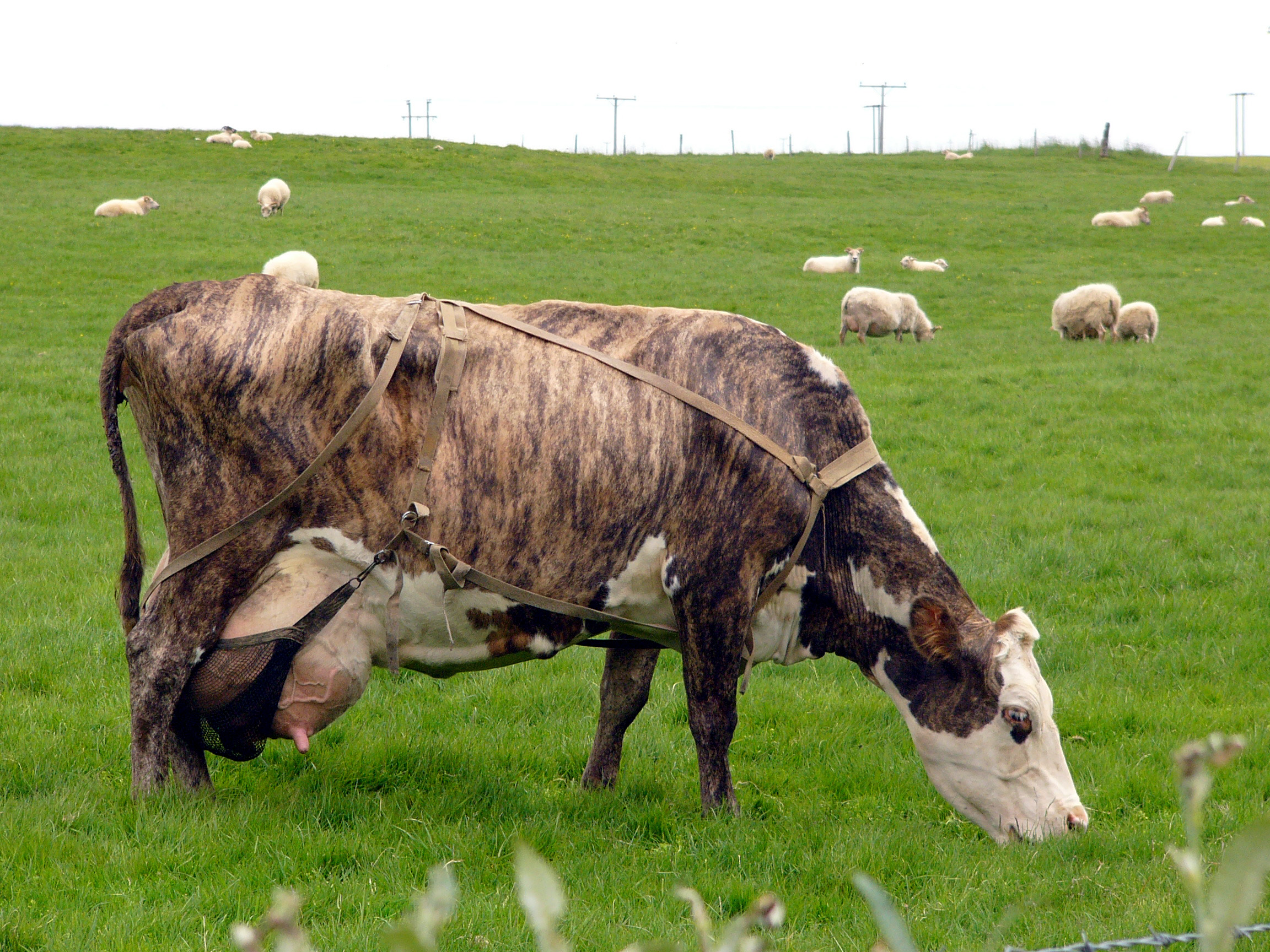
An Icelandic cow, in a pasture with Icelandic sheep

Icelandic cattle (Icelandic: íslenskur nautgripur [ˈistlɛnskʏr ˈnœytˌkrɪːpʏr̥]) are a breed of cattle native to Iceland. Cattle were first brought to the island during the Settlement of Iceland a thousand years ago. Icelandic cows are an especially colorful breed with a wide variety of colours and markings. Icelandic cattle have been genetically isolated for centuries, but are most closely related to a breed in Norway called Blacksided Troender- and Nordland Cattle. No cattle are permitted to be imported into Iceland, so they have been protected by strict disease-prevention measures.

The Icelandic cow is a dairy breed with a small body size. About 95% are naturally polled, but the rest are horned. An average cow can produce about 6,000 kg (13,200 lb) of milk per year, with the best animals producing 11,000 kg (24,300 lb). They are housed for about eight months of the year and fed largely on hay, supplemented with cereals. They are grazed outside in the summer, and to prolong the growing season, cabbage, turnips, barley, and oats are grown for forage. Fewer than 80,000 cows are present in the country and their milk is used to create a mild, butter-flavoured cheese.

According to a report produced by the Agricultural University of Iceland, it would be more cost-effective to replace Icelandic cattle with Swedish cattle, as the latter produce more milk at a lower cost. However, some have argued that Icelandic cattle are part of Iceland's cultural heritage and should not be replaced.

Guðni Ágústsson, former Icelandic minister of agriculture, once kissed an Icelandic cow.

The milk from Icelandic cows is used to make skyr.
