= Icelandic goat =

Breed of goat

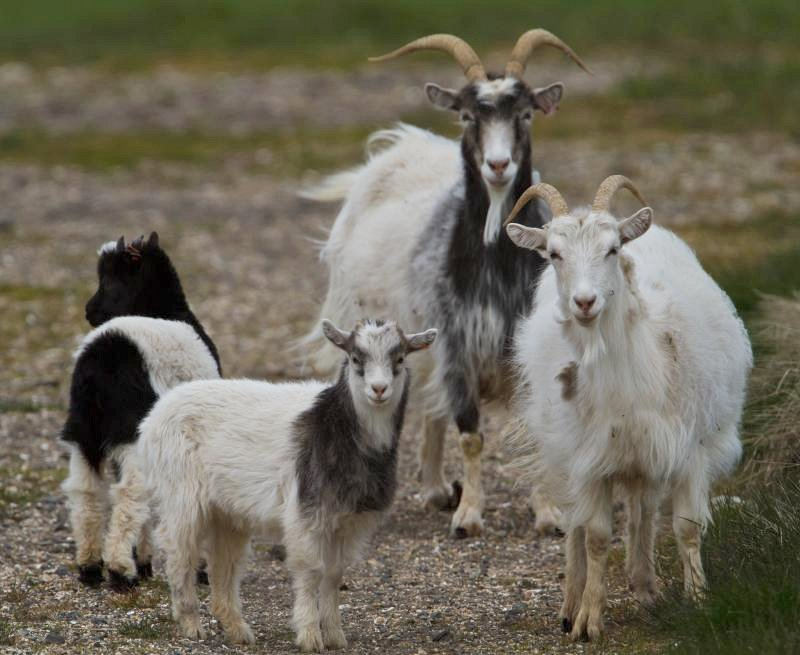
- In Mýrasýsla county
- Country of origin: Iceland
- Use: meat, milk

Traits
- Coat: white
- Face color: white
- Horn status: horned in both sexes
- Goat; Capra aegagrus hircus

The Icelandic goat (Icelandic: íslenska geitin [ˈistlɛnska ˈceiːtɪn]), also known as the 'settlement goat' (Capra hircus), is an ancient breed of domestic goat believed to be of Norwegian origin and dating back to the settlement of Iceland over 1100 years ago. This breed of goat was on the verge of extinction during the late 19th century, but recovered prior to World War II, only to precipitously decline again. The population has dropped below 100 animals several times, leading to genetic bottleneck. As of 2003, there were 348 goats in 48 flocks distributed throughout most parts of Iceland. At the end of 2012, the herd had increased to 849. Since this breed has been isolated for centuries, the Icelandic populations are highly inbred. The Icelandic goat is very rare outside its native land. Under its coarse, long guard hair, the Icelandic goat has a coat of high quality cashmere fiber. Icelandic goats are kept mainly as pets and their economic potential for meat, milk, cashmere and skin production remains to be explored. The Icelandic goat is currently of little economic value.

The Icelandic goat is the only farm animal sponsored by the Icelandic government for the purpose of ensuring its survival. In 2014, the annual grant was ISK 4,200 (36 US dollars) per goat, for a maximum of 20 goats, down from ISK 6,500 (56 US dollars) per goat in 2010, contingent upon the owner submitting a report on each animal. Farmer Jóhanna Bergmann Þorvaldsdóttir has been breeding the Icelandic goat, hoping to prevent extinction.
