= Dwarfing =

Induction of a significant reduction of size or stature in biological organisms

Dwarfing is a process in which a breed of animals or cultivar of plants is changed to become significantly smaller than standard members of their species. The effect can be induced through human intervention or non-human processes, and can include genetic, nutritional or hormonal means. Used most specifically, dwarfing includes pathogenic changes in the structure of an organism (for example, the bulldog, a genetically achondroplastic dog breed), in contrast to non-pathogenic proportional reduction in stature (such as the whippet, a small sighthound dog breed).

== Animals ==
In animals, including humans, dwarfism has been described in several ways. Shortened stature can result from growth hormone deficiency, starvation, portal systemic shunts, renal disease, hypothyroidism, diabetes mellitus and other conditions. Any of these conditions can be established in a population through genetic engineering, selective breeding, or insular dwarfism, or some combination of the above.

Dwarfing can produce more practical breeds that can fit in small accommodations, or may appeal aesthetically, as well as other associated side effects. Smaller stature may be a deliberate goal of breeding programs, or it may be a side effect of other breeding goals.

=== Nonpurposeful dwarfing ===
In some husbandry conditions, humans created dwarf breeds, or allowed them to develop, without specifically selecting for smaller animals. It is likely that the Shetland sheep breed, Shetland collie breed of dogs, and various pony breeds of horses developed in this manner. In the case of the Shetland sheep and collies, it is likely that environmental conditions, such as a lack of abundant fodder, led to farmers selecting smaller animals who continued to reproduce on limited food over larger animals who did not reproduce well on limited diets. In this case, the emphasis was on selecting for survival and reproduction, not size.

=== Purposeful dwarfing ===
Humans have encouraged the deliberate development of dwarf breeds of many domestic animals, including horses, cattle, dogs, and chickens. Some have been breeds of smaller animals that were not originally selected for size, but are now held to specific sizes by a breed standard. In many cases, the exact physiological mechanism that alters the growth of individuals in that breed is not well known, and some breeds have multiple mechanisms at play.

As the genetic mutations that cause dwarfing occur in many species, dwarf animals can be the offspring of normal-appearing animals. Even in breeds which have not been selected for dwarfing, some genetic lines may show a tendency to produce dwarfs, which may be encouraged by deliberate breeding. This often takes the form of in-breeding to concentrate recessive genes, and can result in other genetic abnormalities being established in the population.

Some animal breeds that have been formally subject to dwarfing include:

- Rabbits (American Fuzzy Lop, Britannia Petite (US), Dwarf Hotot, Florida White Rabbit, Jersey Wooly, Lionhead Polish (UK), Holland Lop Netherland Dwarf, Mini Rex, Mini Satin, others)
- Dogs (English Bulldog, French Bulldog, Chihuahua, Corgi, Whippet, Miniature Pinscher, others)
- Poultry (Bantam chickens, Call Ducks)
- Goats (Nigerian Dwarf, Pygmy Goat)
- Cattle (Dwarf Brahman, Lowline cattle Guinea Cracker Cattle, Dexter cattle)
- Equines (Miniature Donkey, Fell Pony, Hackney Pony Miniature horse, Shetland Pony, others)

== Plants ==
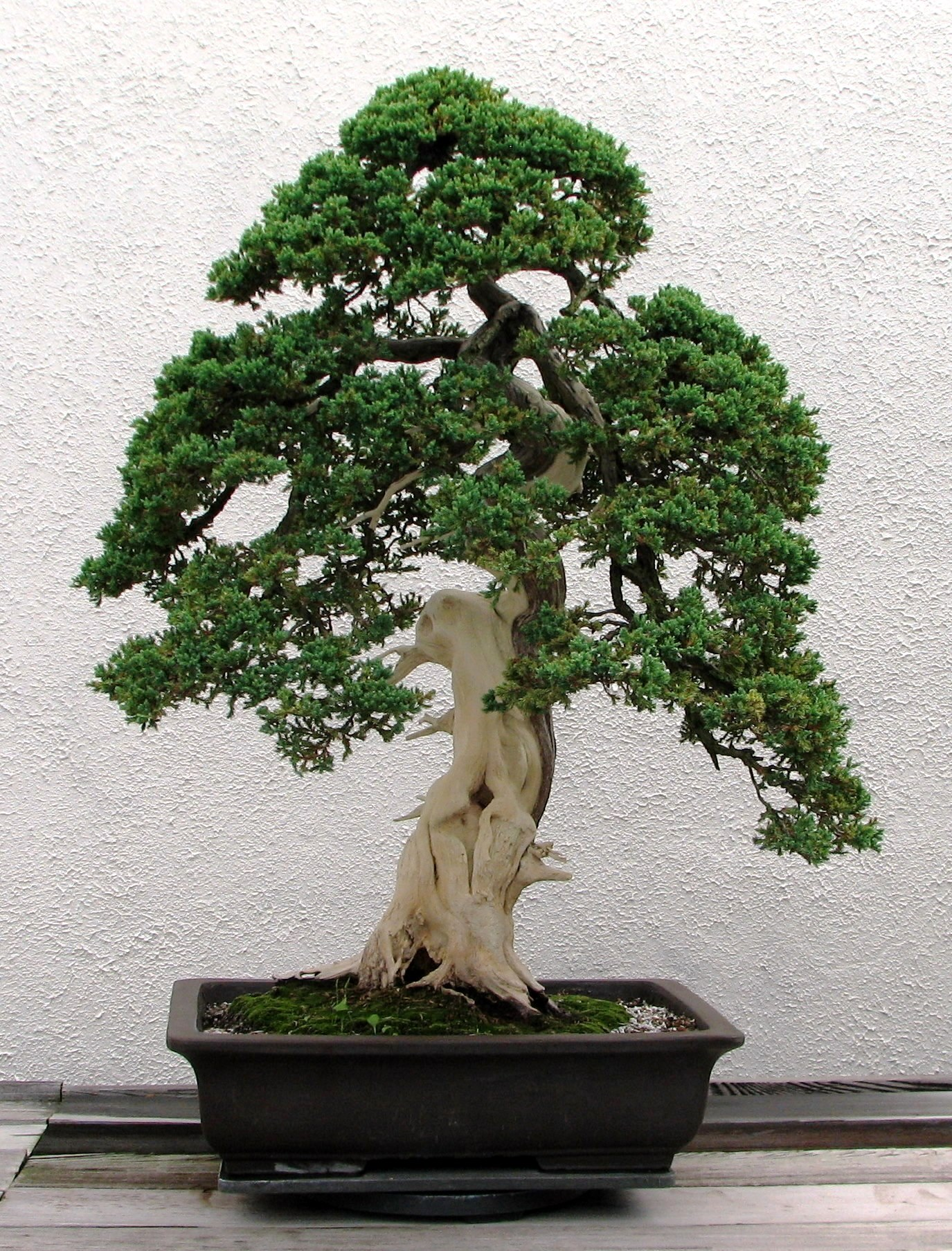
Dwarf Japanese juniper

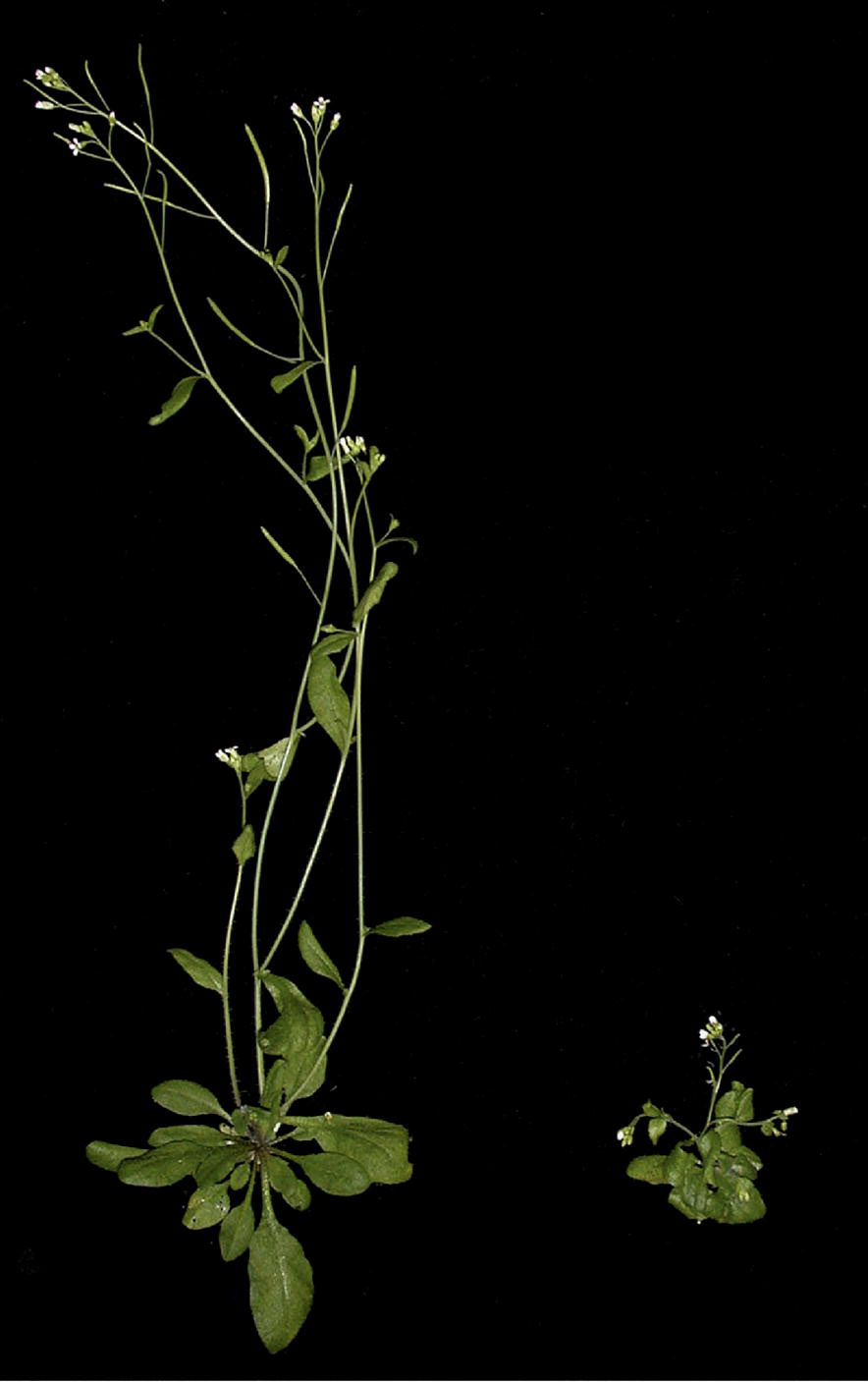
Lack of the plant growth factor auxin can cause dwarfing (right)

As with animals, plants can be dwarfed through genetic engineering and selective breeding, but can also undergo natural, morphological changes to acclimatize to environmental stresses such as soil quality, light, drought, flood, cold, infection, and herbivory resulting in a dwarfed stature. Plants dwarfed due to environmental stress are said to be stunted. The majority of dwarfing in plants occurs not from the damage environmental stresses inflict on them, but instead by hormones produced in response to the stress. Plant hormones act as a signal to the various tissues of plants inducing one or more responses; the class of plant hormone responsible for dwarfing in plants due to injury are called jasmonates. Such responses include, but are not limited to: less frequent cell divisions and reduction of cell elongation.

=== Dwarfing trees ===
In horticulture, dwarfing can be considered a desirable characteristic in modern orchards. This kind of dwarfing can be attained through selective breeding, genetic engineering, or more often, scions are grafted on to dwarfing rootstocks. Almost all modern apples in commercial use are propagated as dwarf or semi-dwarf trees for ease of picking and spraying.

Dwarfing fruit trees acts through a reduction in the nutrients which travel from the roots through the trunk to the leaves and buds. Many commercial orchards of various species use this technique to improve the overall health and productivity of the individual trees. An individual tree may be made up of three or more separate cultivars - one for the root system, which is generally selected for good stability and resistance to soil-borne diseases, one for the trunk, which modifies the overall height of the tree, and one for the productive limbs and buds, which actually produces the fruit. Frequently, the root system stock is the most resistant to cold damage - both by natural selection and by protection from the cold air by the earth. When frost severely damages a tree, the more productive branch and bud cultivar may be killed off, leaving the root to sprout new stalks. In the case of oranges and other citrus, this results in sweet orange trees being frozen back so that the more hardy, cold-tolerant sour orange rootstock puts out new growth.

=== Dwarfing grains ===
Dwarfing genes are widely used in creating more productive food plants, such as grains. One condition that results in loss of grain crops is called lodging, where heavy ears of almost ripe grain bend the stalk until the grain touches the ground, becomes wet, and spoils. During the Green Revolution, research that identified wheat reduced-height genes (Rht) and a rice semidwarf gene (sd1) resulted in crops that yielded significantly more harvestable grain.

== See also ==
- Dwarf
- Dwarfism in chickens
- Fruit tree propagation
- Genomics of domestication
- Green revolution
- Habit (biology)
- Deep-sea gigantism
- Foster's rule
- Insular dwarfism
- Island gigantism
- Prostrate shrub
