= Cephalic index =

Ratio of width to length of the head of an organism

Cephalic index viewed from above the head

The cephalic index or cranial index is a number obtained by taking the maximum width (biparietal diameter or BPD, side to side) of the head of an organism, multiplying it by 100 and then dividing it by their maximum length (occipitofrontal diameter or OFD, front to back). It is used to categorize dog and cat breeds. In humans, it serves diagnostic purposes for some disorders. It has also been used in the modelling of human migrations to categorize remains.

== Historic use in anthropology ==
=== Early anthropology ===
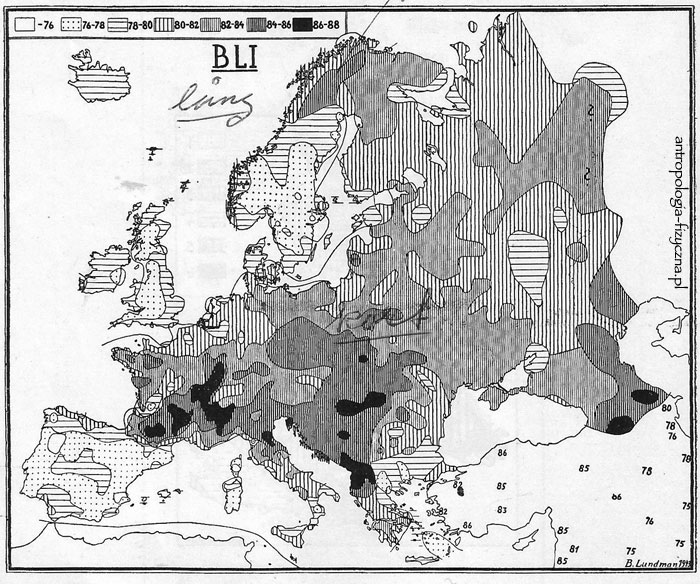
Cephalic index map of Europe by Bertil Lundman

The cephalic index was used by anthropologists in the early 20th century as a tool to categorize human populations. It was used to describe an individual's appearance and for estimating the age of fetuses for legal and obstetrical reasons.

The cephalic index was defined by Swedish professor of anatomy Anders Retzius (1796–1860) and first used in physical anthropology to classify ancient human remains found in Europe. The theory became closely associated with the development of racial anthropology in the 19th and early 20th centuries, when historians attempted to use ancient remains to model population movements in terms of racial categories. American anthropologist Carleton S. Coon also used the index in the 1960s, by which time it had been largely discredited.

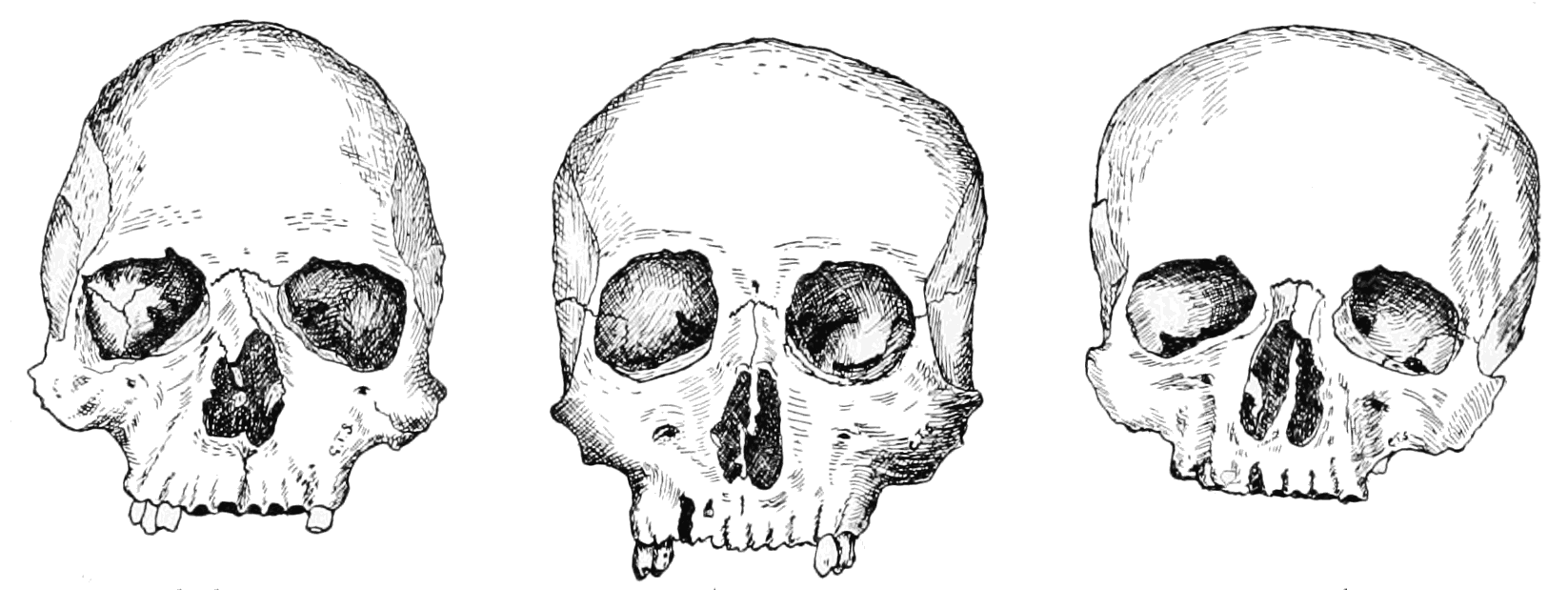
Cephalic indexes of skull shapes. Long skull (left) – cephalic index 71.4; tall skull (center) – cephalic index 81; broad skull (right) – cephalic index 85

In the cephalic index model, human beings were characterized by having either a dolichocephalic (long-headed), mesaticephalic (moderate-headed), or brachycephalic (short-headed) cephalic index or cranial index.

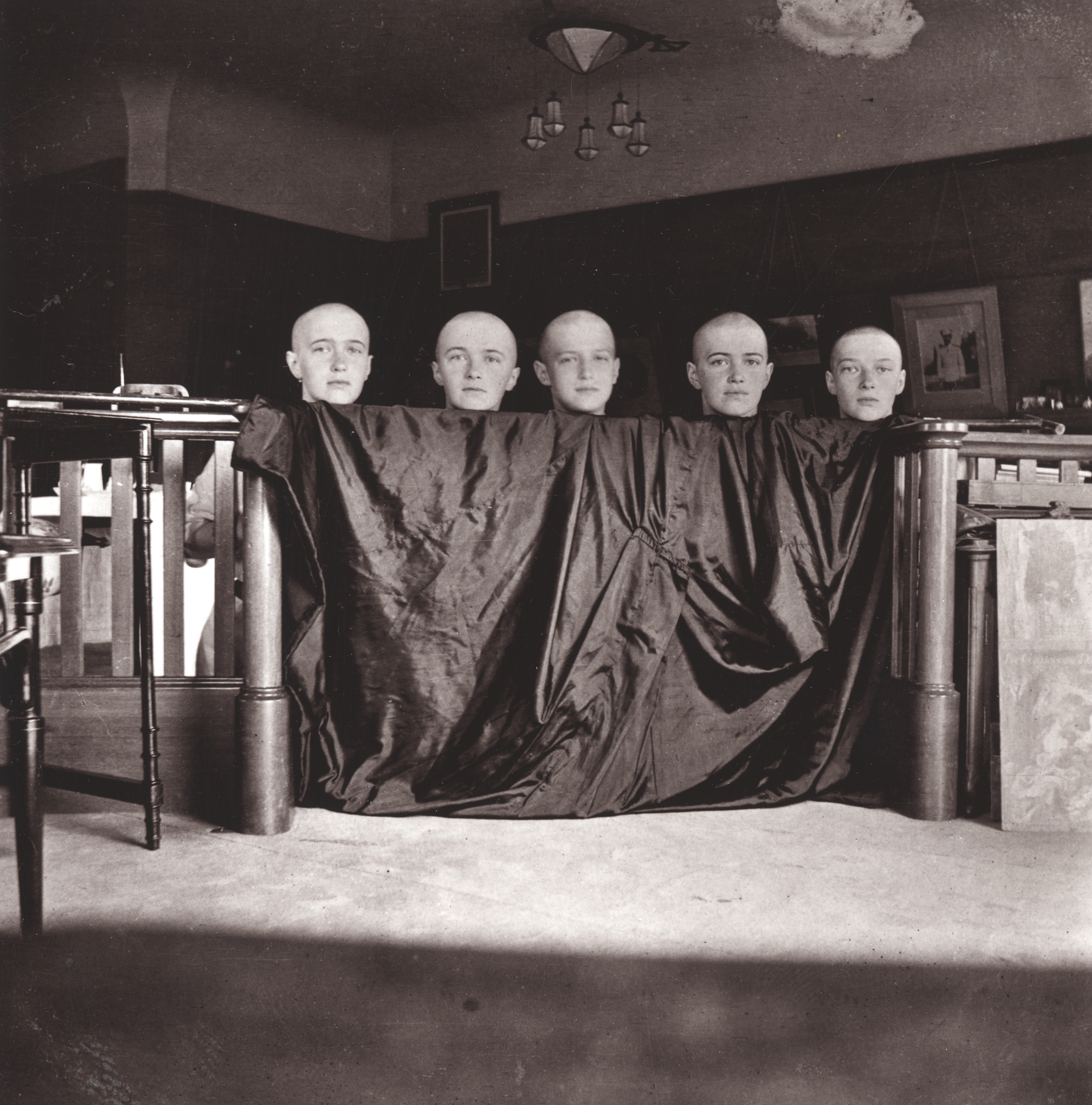
The children of the Tsar Nicholas II of Russia in June 1917, with loss of hair after fighting measles: among them, Tatiana (far right) had the skull with least cephalic index.

=== Indices ===
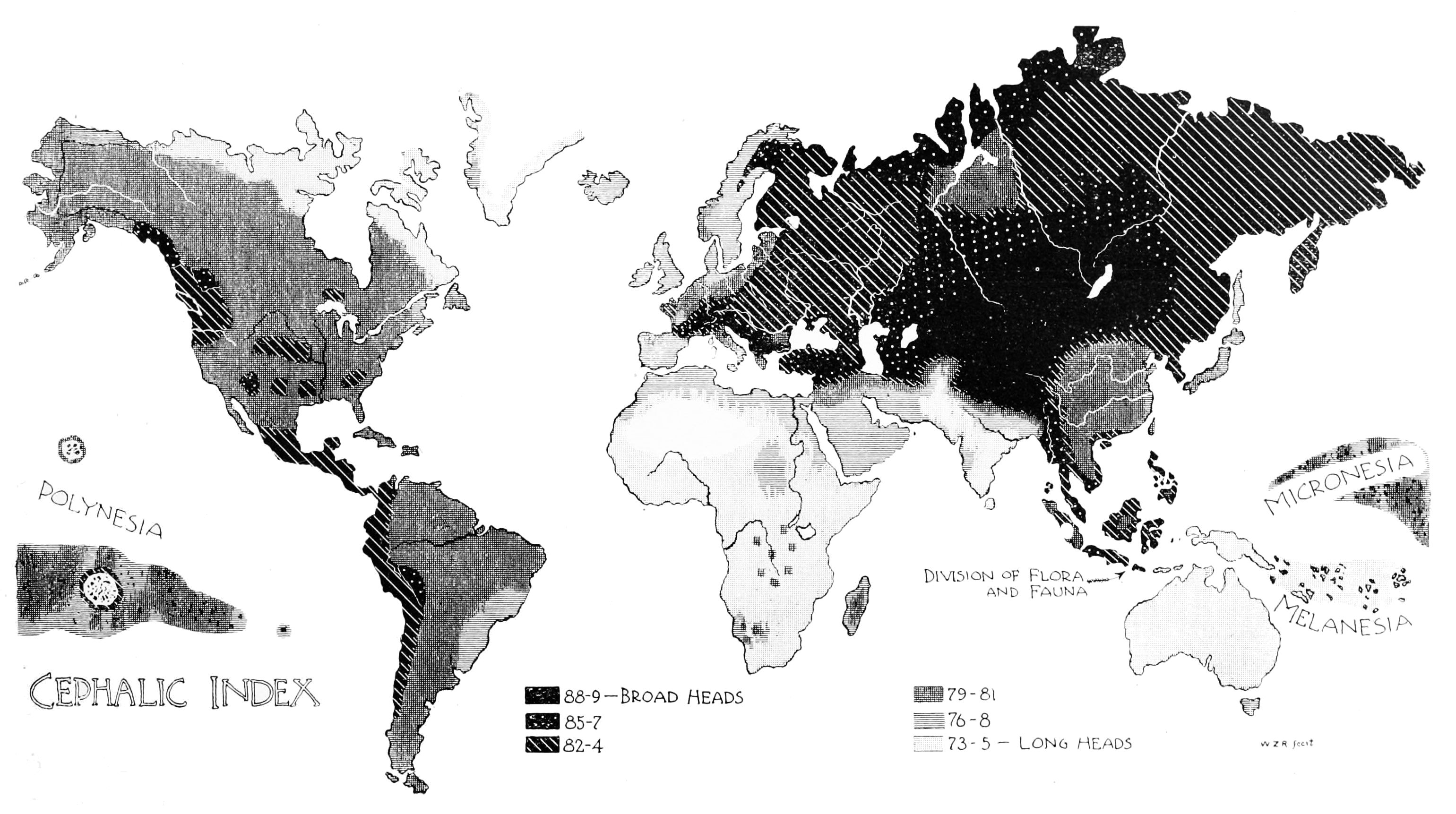
1896 world cephalic index map

Cephalic indices are grouped as in the following table:

Cephalic index	Scientific term	Meaning	Alternative term
< 65.5	ultradolichocephalic	'extremely long-headed'	
65.5–69.9	hyperdolichocephalic	'very long-headed'	
70.0–74.9	dolichocephalic	'long-headed'	
75.0–79.9	mesocephalic	'medium-headed'	mesaticephalic; mesocranial
80.0–84.9	brachycephalic	'short-headed'	brachycranial
85.0–89.9	hyperbrachycephalic	'very short-headed'	
≥ 90.0	ultrabrachycephalic	'extremely short-headed'	

Technically, the measured factors are defined as the maximum width of the bones that surround the head above the supramastoid crest (behind the cheekbones), and the maximum length from the most easily noticed part of the glabella (between the eyebrows) to the most easily noticed point on the back part of the head.

Measurement methods have progressed from spreading calipers on living subjects and dry skulls to cephalometric radiography, multidetector computed tomography and three-dimensional morphometric modelling. Values from living heads include scalp soft tissue, so they are not directly comparable with dry-skull or autopsy measurements. Studies also differ in landmark definitions and in the cut-off values used for classification.

=== Controversy ===
The usefulness of the cephalic index was questioned by anthropologist Giuseppe Sergi, who argued that cranial morphology provided a better means to model racial ancestry. Also, Franz Boas studied the children of immigrants to the United States in 1910 to 1912, noting that the children's cephalic index differed significantly from their parents', implying that local environmental conditions had a significant effect on the development of head shape.

Boas argued that if craniofacial features were so malleable in a single generation, then the cephalic index was of little use for defining race and mapping ancestral populations. Scholars such as Earnest Hooton continued to argue that both environment and heredity were involved. Boas did not himself claim it was totally plastic.

In 2002, a paper by Sparks and Jantz re-evaluated some of Boas's original data using new statistical techniques and concluded that there was a "relatively high genetic component" of head shape. Ralph Holloway of Columbia University argues that the new research raises questions about whether the variations in skull shape have "adaptive meaning and whether, in fact, normalizing selection might be at work on the trait, where both extremes, hyperdolichocephaly and hyperbrachycephaly, are at a slight selective disadvantage."

In 2003, anthropologists Clarence C. Gravlee, H. Russell Bernard, and William R. Leonard reanalyzed Boas's data and concluded that most of Boas's original findings were correct. Moreover, they applied new statistical, computer-assisted methods to Boas's data and discovered more evidence for cranial plasticity. In a later publication, Gravlee, Bernard and Leonard reviewed Sparks's and Jantz's analysis. They argue that Sparks and Jantz misrepresented Boas's claims, and that Sparks's and Jantz's data support Boas. For example, they point out that Sparks and Jantz look at changes in cranial size in relation to how long an individual has been in the United States in order to test the influence of the environment. Boas, however, looked at changes in cranial size in relation to how long the mother had been in the United States. They argue that Boas's method is more useful, because the prenatal environment is a crucial developmental factor.

Long-term studies show that the cephalic index of a population can shift substantially over time. Korean data spanning about two thousand years show a progressive change from mesocephalic toward brachycephalic head form. This was later followed by a reversal (“debrachycephalization”) in people born after about 1965 (males) and 1970 (females). Similar long-term brachycephalization has been documented in Japan. In Britain, phases of lengthening and broadening of the head alternated between the 12th and 19th centuries.

An analysis of Indian populations found that groups in hotter climatic zones tended toward longer, dolichocephalic heads, while those in colder zones tended toward mesocephaly and brachycephaly. The association was strongest among Scheduled Tribes. Admixed populations need not have intermediate values: a study of northeastern Brazilian men of mixed Portuguese, African and Indigenous ancestry found that about 84% were brachycephalic.

Jantz and Sparks responded to Gravlee et al., reiterating that Boas' findings lacked biological meaning, and that the interpretation of Boas' results common in the literature was biologically inaccurate. In a later study, the same authors concluded that the effects Boas observed were likely the result of population-specific environmental effects such as changes in cultural practices for cradling infants, rather than the effects of a general "American environment" which caused populations in America to converge to a common cranial type, as Boas had suggested.

A 2026 systematic review of 31 studies concluded that the cephalic index remains useful for describing average head shape at the population level, tracking changes across generations, and setting local reference values for clinical use. However, the wide overlap between populations, change over time, and environmental influences mean it cannot reliably determine the ancestry or population affinity of an individual. The review recommended that forensic assessment of population affinity rely instead on validated multivariable craniometric methods and complete biological profiles.

== Modern population studies ==
Modern data show that cephalic index values form a continuous spectrum rather than falling into discrete racial categories. Within South Asia alone, population averages span the full range of classical categories. Studies have reported dolichocephalic series from Pakistani Punjab, mesocephalic populations in Bengal, Delhi and Tamil Nadu, and brachycephalic populations in Tripura and among the Gurung of Nepal. Population distributions also overlap extensively. In one Delhi autopsy series, about 81% of individuals fell within a range of 72.5–84.9, which encompasses the mean values reported for populations in India, Nigeria and Iran.

== Sex differences ==
Absolute skull dimensions are generally larger in males, but sex differences in the cephalic index itself are inconsistent across populations. In several populations, including samples from Egypt, Nepal and parts of India, females had a significantly higher index. In others, the difference was not statistically significant, and in one Tamil sample males had the higher index.

== Vertical cephalic index ==
The vertical cephalic index, also known as the length-height index, was a less-commonly measured head ratio. In the vertical cephalic index model, humans beings were characterized by having either a chamaecranic (low-skulled), orthocranic (medium high-skulled), or hypsicranic (high-skulled) cephalic index or cranial index.

== Medicine ==
The cephalic index is also used in medicine, especially in the planning and effectiveness analysis of cranial deformity corrections. The index is a useful tool in assessing the morphology of cranial deformities in clinical settings. The index is used while looking at the fetal head shape, and can change in certain situations (e.g. breech presentation, ruptured membranes, twin pregnancy). It can be measured for prenatal infants in the womb using obstetric ultrasound, and a value of 78.3% ± 8% (±2 standard deviations) is considered normal.

== Modern use in animal breeding ==
The cephalic index is used in the categorisation of animals, especially breeds of dogs and cats.

=== Brachycephalic animals ===
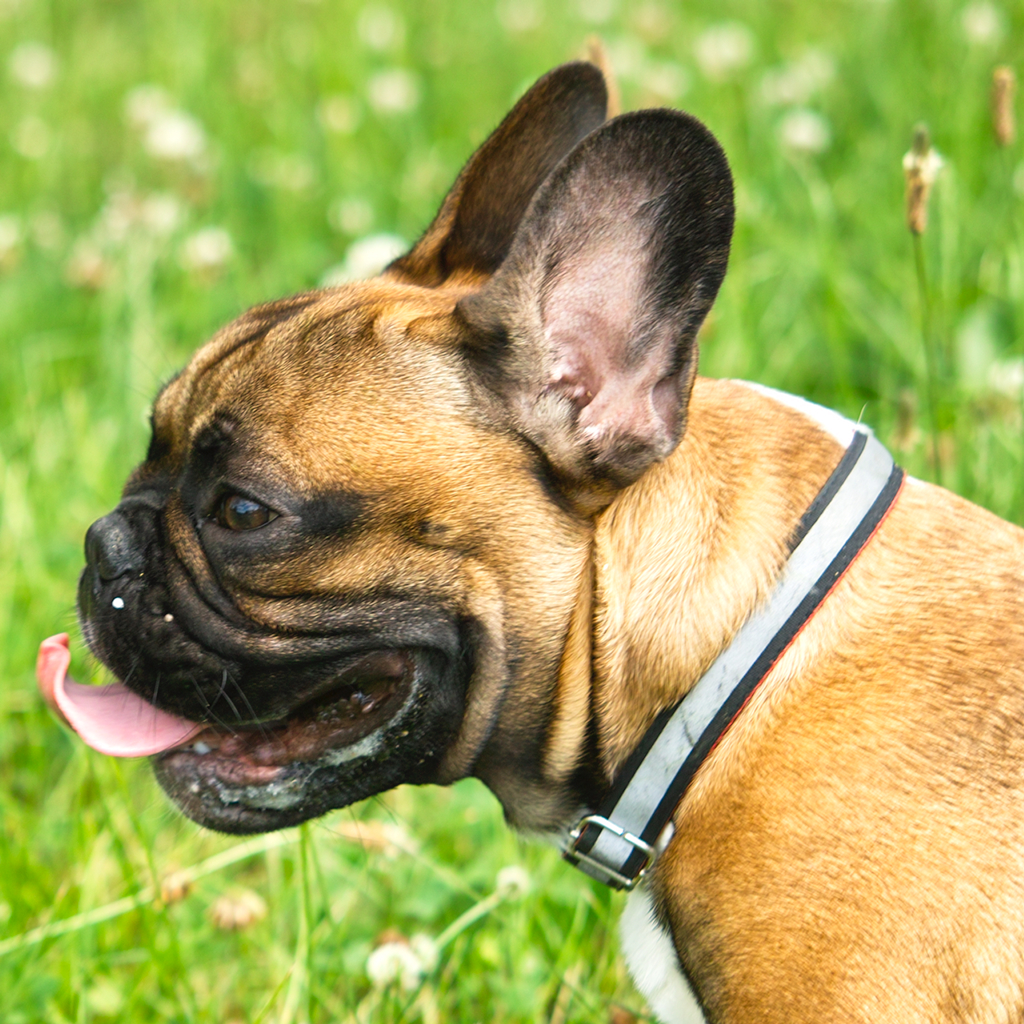
Brachycephalic French Bulldog, with visible indications of laboured breathing.

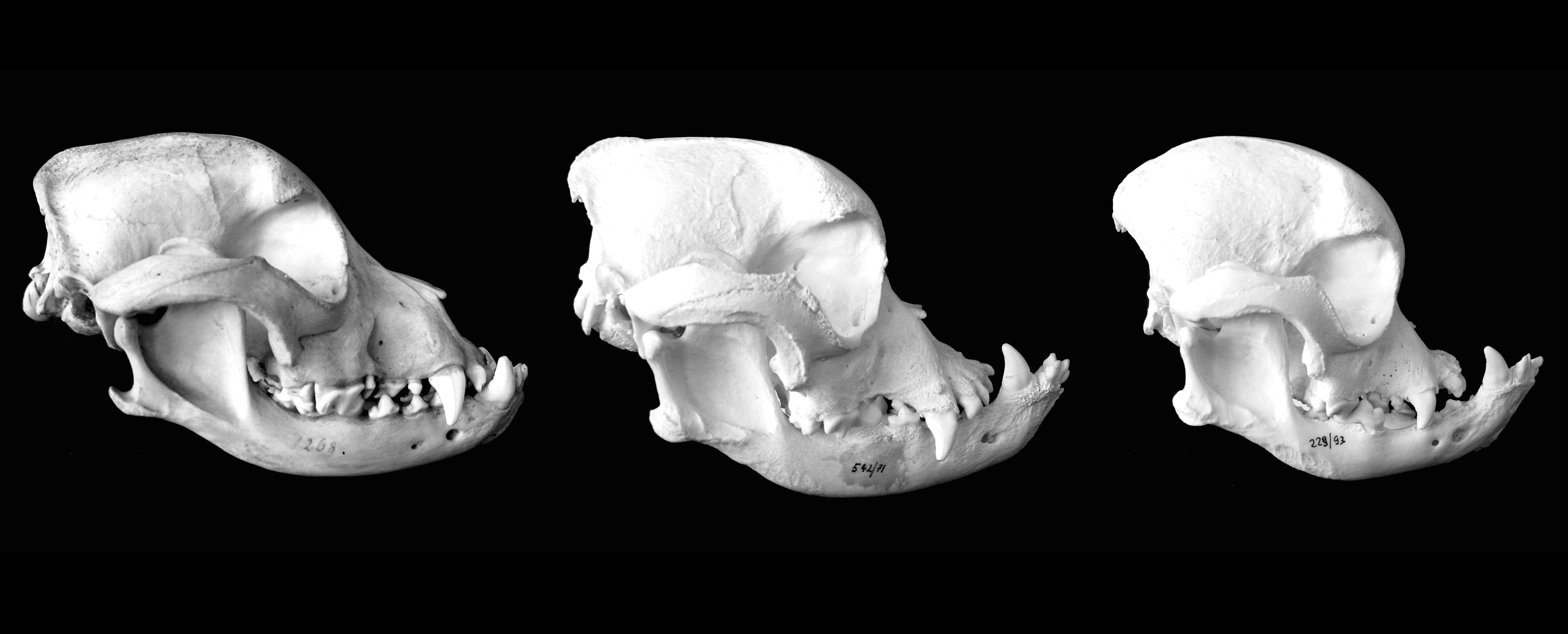
English Bulldog: Left: 1900–1920. Middle: Switzerland-Champion *1963 †1971. Right: Female *1985 †1993.

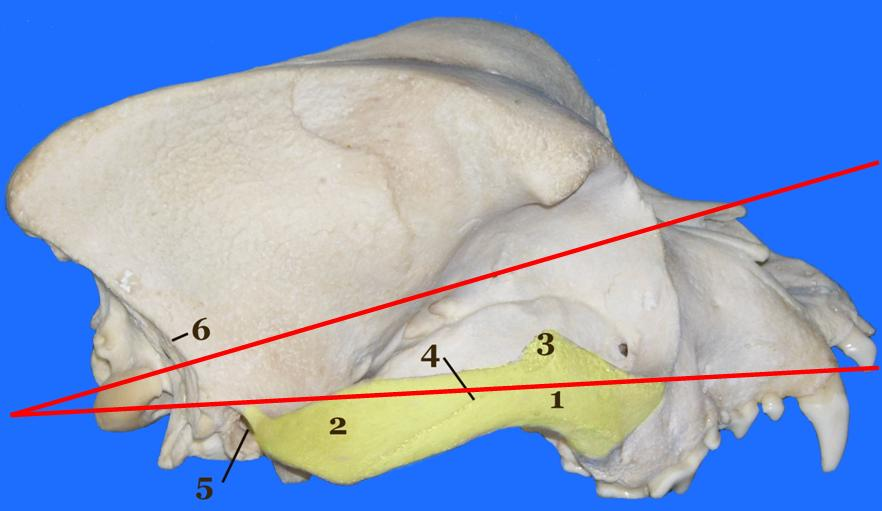
Craniofacial angle of a Boxer

A brachycephalic skull is relatively broad and short (typically with the breadth at least 80% of the length). Dog breeds such as the pug are sometimes classified as "extreme brachycephalic". Because of health issues brachycephaly is regarded in some countries as "qualzucht", which literally translates to "torture breeding" as it often leads to brachycephalic airway obstructive syndrome.

==== List of brachycephalic dogs ====
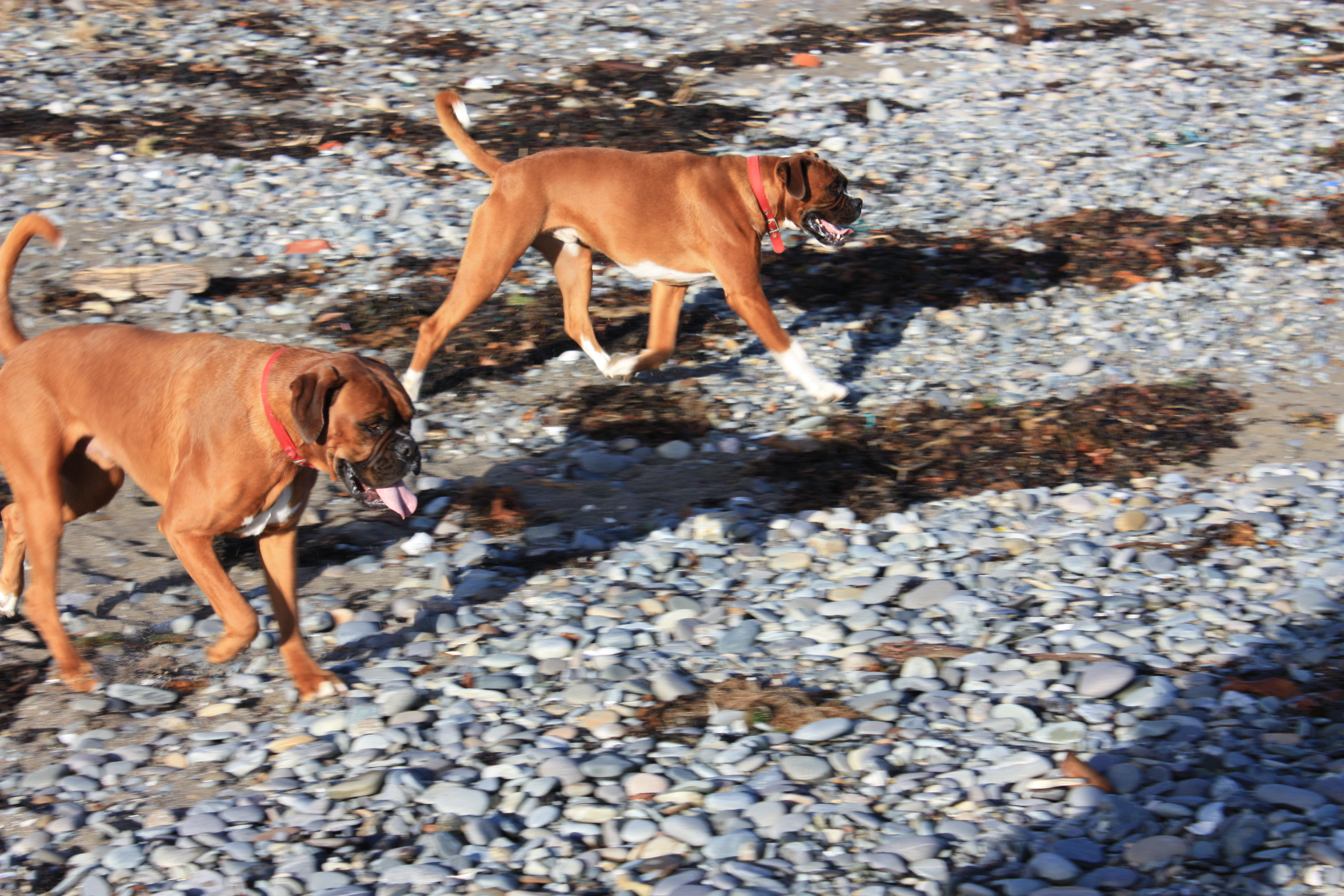
Breeds with less extreme brachycephalia, such as the Boxer, have less compromised thermoregulation and thus are more tolerant of vigorous exercise and heat.

- Affenpinscher
- American Bulldog
- American Bully
- Bernese Mountain Dog
- Boston Terrier
- Boxer
- Brussels Griffon
- Bulldog
- Bullmastiff
- Cane Corso
- Cavalier King Charles Spaniel
- Apple-headed Chihuahua
- Chow Chow
- Dogo Argentino
- Dogue de Bordeaux
- English Mastiff
- English Bulldog
- Fila Brasileiro
- French Bulldog
- Japanese Chin
- King Charles Spaniel
- Lhasa Apso
- Lowchen
- Neapolitan Mastiff
- Newfoundland
- Olde English Bulldogge
- Pekingese
- Perro de Presa Canario
- Pit bull
- Pug
- Pyrenean Mastiff
- Rottweiler
- Shar-Pei
- Shih Tzu
- St. Bernard
- Tibetan Spaniel
- Tosa

==== List of brachycephalic cats ====
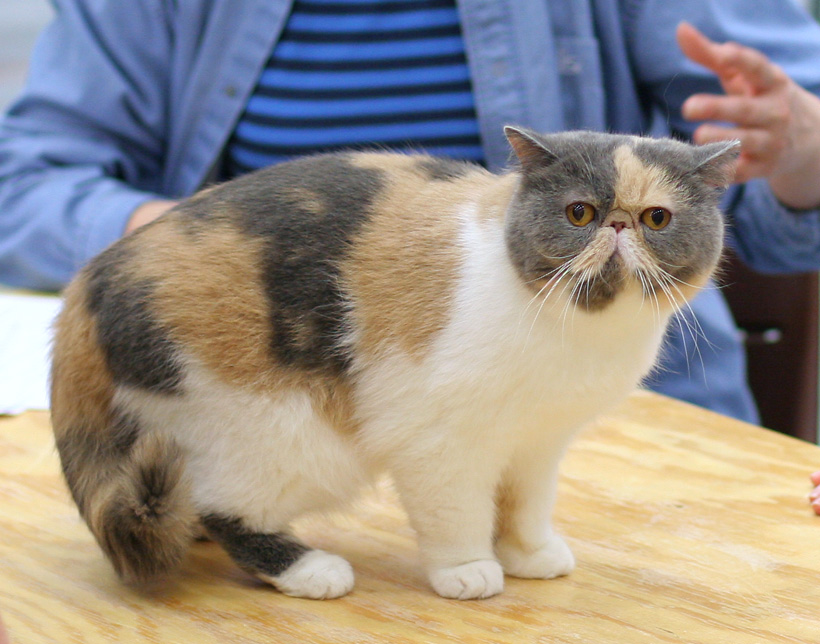
An Exotic Shorthair

- British Shorthair
- Burmese cat
- Exotic Shorthair
- Himalayan cat
- Persian cat
- Scottish Fold
- White tiger

==== List of brachycephalic pigs ====
- Middle White
- Neijiang

==== List of brachycephalic rabbits ====
- Lionhead rabbit
- Lop rabbit
- Netherland Dwarf rabbit
- Dwarf Papillon rabbit
- Dwarf Hotot rabbit
- Jersey Wooly rabbit
- American Fuzzylop rabbit

==== Other ====
- Alligator
- Australian Lowline
- brachycephalic Arabian horse
- Elephant
- European bison
- Giant panda
- Niata cattle
- Otter
- Raccoon dog
- Ross seal
- Sloth
- Spectacled bear
- Sun bear
- Tortoise
- Walrus
- Wombat

=== Mesaticephalic animals ===
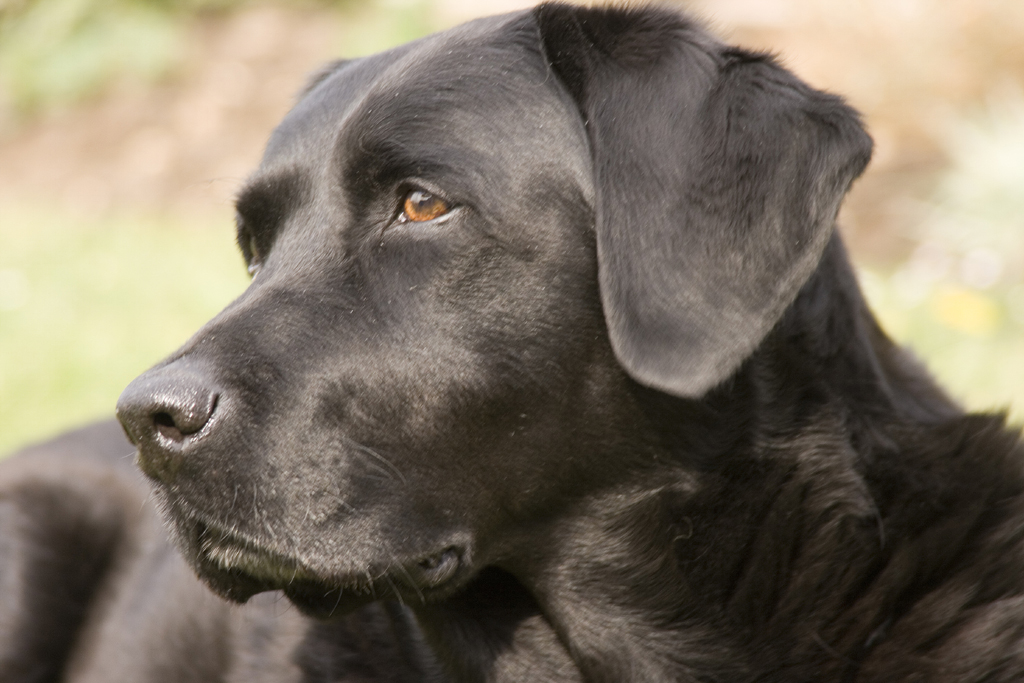
Mesocephalic Labrador Retriever

A mesaticephalic skull is of intermediate length and width. Mesaticephalic skulls are not markedly brachycephalic or dolichocephalic. When dealing with animals, especially dogs, the more appropriate and commonly used term is not "mesocephalic", but rather "mesaticephalic", which is a ratio of head to nasal cavity. The breeds below exemplify this category.

==== List of mesaticephalic canids ====
Note: Almost all canidae are mesaticephalic ("medium-headed")

- African Wild Dog
- Airedale Terrier
- Alaskan Malamute
- almost all spaniels
  - Field Spaniel
- almost all terriers
  - American Pit Bull Terrier (some lines do have mesaticephalic faces)
  - Bedlington Terrier
  - Cesky Terrier
  - Irish Terrier
  - Kerry Blue Terrier
  - Russian Black Terrier
  - Scottish Terrier
  - Sealyham Terrier
  - Welsh Terrier
- American Foxhound
- Appenzeller Sennenhund
- Australian Cattle Dog
- Australian Shepherd
- Basset Hound
- Beagle
- Bearded Collie
- Beauceron
- Belgian Sheepdog
- Black and Tan Coonhound
- Bloodhound
- Border Collie
- Chesapeake Bay Retriever
- Chinook
- Coyote
- Curly-Coated Retriever
- Dalmatian
- Dhole
- Dingo
- English Foxhound
- Flat-Coated Retriever
- German Shepherd Dog
- German Shorthaired Pointer
- German Wirehaired Pointer
- Golden Retriever
- Irish Setter
- Komondor
- Labrador Retriever
- Mudi
- Puli
- Serbian Hound
- Schnauzer
- Siberian Husky
- Vizsla
- Weimaraner
- Wirehaired Vizsla
- Wolf

==== List of mesaticephalic cats ====
Note: Almost all domestic felines are mesaticephalic

- Abyssinian
- American Shorthair
- American Bobtail
- Bengal cat
- Birman
- Bombay cat
- Burmese cat
- Chartreux
- Chausie
- Cheetah
- Colorpoint Shorthair
- Cymric cat
- Egyptian Mau
- Felid hybrids
- Felis, or small cats
- Maine Coon
- Manx
- Mountain Lion
- Munchkin cat
- Norwegian forest cat
- Ocicat
- Pallas's cat
- Ragdoll
- Russian Blue
- Russian White, Black and Tabby
- Selkirk Rex
- Siberian cat
- Somali
- Toyger
- Turkish Angora
- Turkish Van

==== List of mesaticephalic rabbits ====
- Dutch rabbit
- Mini Rex
- Polish rabbit
- New Zealand rabbit
- American Sable

==== Other ====
- Aardwolf
- American black bear
- Brown bear
- Brown hyena
- Crocodile
- Fur seal
- Guinea pig
- Hyrax
- Leopard seal
- Raccoon
- Sea lion
- Spotted hyena
- Striped hyena
- Tasmanian devil

=== Dolichocephalic animals ===
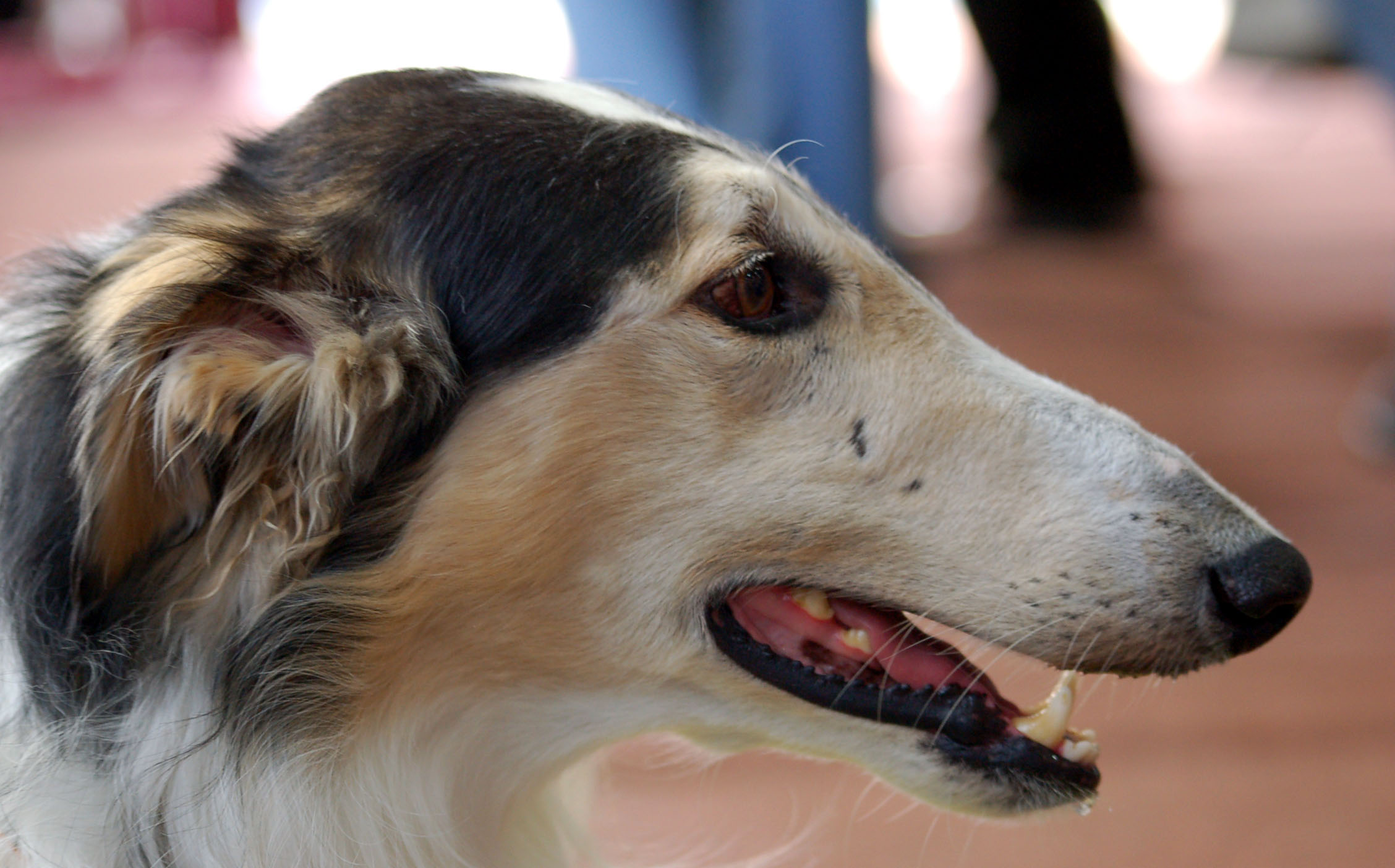
Dolichocephalic Borzoi

A dolichocephalic skull is relatively long-headed (typically with the breadth less than 80% or 75% of the length).

Note: Almost all representatives of the infraphylum Gnathostomata (with rare exceptions) are dolichocephalic.

==== List of dolichocephalic canines ====
- Afghan Hound
- American Eskimo Dog
- Azawakh
- Basenji
- Bichon Frisé
- Borzoi
- Bull Terrier
- Cardigan Welsh Corgi
- pear- and deer-headed Chihuahuas
- Chinese Crested
- Dachshund
- Doberman Pinscher
- Finnish Lapphund
- Finnish Spitz
- Fox Terrier
- Galgo Español
- German Spitz
- Great Dane
- Greyhound
- Irish Wolfhound
- Italian Greyhound
- Kangaroo hound
- Kanni
- Khalag Tazi
- Long dog
- Lurcher
- Manchester Terrier
- Miniature Bull Terrier
- Miniature Pinscher
- most spitz, except for the Chow Chow
- Pembroke Welsh Corgi
- Peruvian Inca Orchid
- Pharaoh Hound
- Pomeranian
- Poodle (Miniature and Toy)
- Poodle (Standard)
- Rampur Greyhound
- Rough Collie
- Saluki
- Samoyed
- Scottish Deerhound
- Shetland Sheepdog
- Silken Windhound
- Sloughi
- Smooth Collie
- Taigan
- Whippet
- Xoloitzcuintle

==== List of dolichocephalic felines ====
- Balinese
- Devon Rex
- Donskoy
- Jaguar
- Javanese
- Leopard
- Lion
- Ocelot
- Oriental Bicolor and Tricolor
- Oriental Longhair
- Oriental Shorthair
- Panthera hybrid
- Peterbald
- Sabertooth cats
- Savannah
- Siamese
- Snow leopard
- Sphynx
- Tiger

==== List of dolichocephalic leporids ====
- English Spot
- English Lop
- Belgian Hare
- All true hares

==== Other ====
- Baboon
- Bontebok
- Cow
- Dinosaur (including birds)
- Dolphin
- Domestic horse
- Donkey
- Gharial
- Grevy's zebra
- Hartebeest
- Kangaroo
- Mule
- Onager
- Plains zebra
- Polar bear
- Sloth bear
- Thylacine
- Warthog
- Whale
- Wild boar
- Wildebeest

== See also ==
- Cephalic index in cats and dogs
- Craniometry
- Phrenology
- Human skull
