= Florida white =

Florida white(s), or Florida White(s) may refer to:

- White people within the demographics of Florida, in general; (may be rendered white or White)
  - White Southerners, as a longer-term historical group, in Florida
  - Florida cracker subculture even more narrowly
- Florida white butterfly – the species Appias drusilla, sometimes also called the tropical white butterfly; in the family Pieridae, with a range from Florida to Brazil (sometimes capitalized White, especially in lepidopterology journals)
- Florida White rabbit – an albino breed of domesticated rabbit; originally produced for laboratories and as meat animals, now common in the pet trade

== See also ==
- Florida White & Blue – one of several informal names for the football team of the University of Florida in Lake City (a predecessor team and institution of the Florida Gators and modern University of Florida)
- Florida White House (disambiguation) – informal term for any of several US presidents' residences within the state
