= Dwarf rabbit =

Breed of rabbit

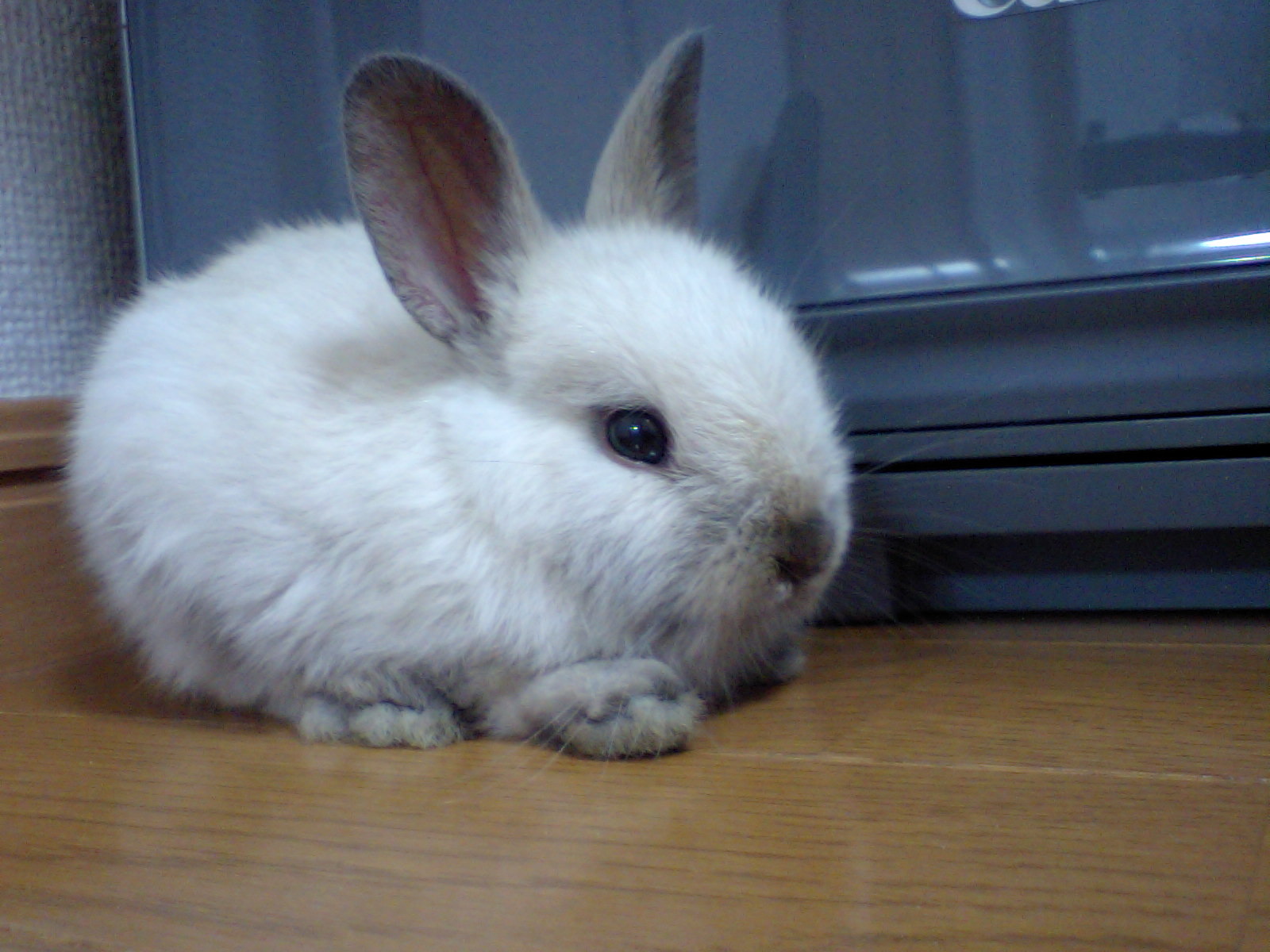
A dwarf rabbit (Netherland Dwarf breed)

Dwarf rabbit refers either (formally) to a rabbit with the dwarfing gene, or (informally) to any small breed of domestic rabbit or specimen thereof, or (colloquially) to any small rabbit. Dwarfism is a genetic condition that may occur in humans and in many animals, including rabbits. True dwarfism is often associated with a cluster of physical abnormalities, including pituitary dwarfism. The process of dwarfing is used to selectively breed for smaller stature with each generation. Small stature is a characteristic of neoteny, which may account (in part) for the attraction of dwarf animals.

== Small rabbits ==
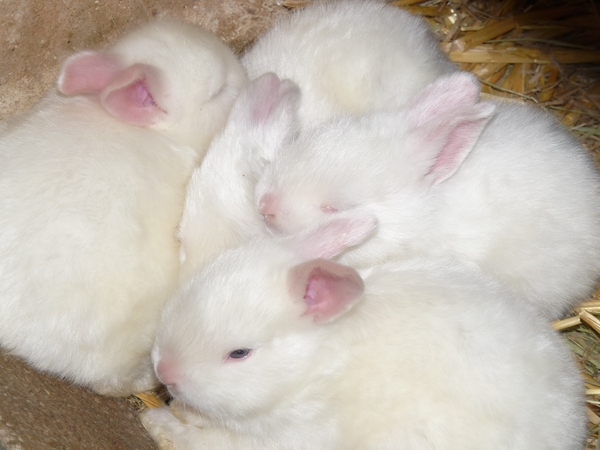
Baby Mini Satin rabbits Blue-eyed white - Satin coat

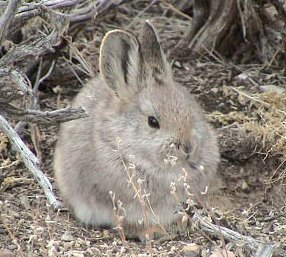
Pygmy rabbit (Sylvilagus idahoensis) 375–500 grams (0.827–1.102 lb)

The Netherland Dwarf is the smallest of the domestic rabbits. The American Rabbit Breeders Association (ARBA) accepts a weight range of 1.1–3.5 lb (0.50–1.59 kg), but 2.5 lb (1.1 kg) is the maximum allowed by the British Rabbit Council (BRC). The small stature of the Netherland Dwarf was initially the result of the dwarfing gene: dw. Its short neck and rounded face are additional features of neoteny.

Many small rabbit breeds have the dwarfing gene, but the Polish and the Britannia Petite are among those that do not. They have attained their small stature solely through selective breeding of successively smaller generations (a process called dwarfing).

Some small rabbits (often mixed breeds) are a false dwarf, a rabbit that did not inherit the dwarfing gene.

One of the smallest species of wild rabbit is the Marsh rabbit (Sylvilagus palustris), an excellent swimmer that weighs 2.2–2.6 lb (1.00–1.18 kg).

== Smallest rabbit breeds ==
The following table includes rabbit breeds currently recognized by ARBA or by the BRC that have a maximum weight of 4 lb (1.8 kg). Also included is a small breed from Germany, the Teddy Dwarf.

Domestic rabbit breeds <4 lb (1.8 kg)
| Breed name | Image | Weight | Ear type |
|---|---|---|---|
| Netherland Dwarf | | 1.1–2.5 lb (0.50–1.13 kg) | erect |
| Britannia Petite [US] | | 1.5–2.5 lb (0.68–1.13 kg) | erect |
| Teddy Dwarf; Also called: Teddyzwerg | | 1.75–3.75 lb (0.79–1.70 kg) | erect |
| Dwarf Hotot | | 2–3 lb (0.91–1.36 kg) | erect |
| Jersey Wooly | | 2.5–3.5 lb (1.1–1.6 kg) | erect |
| Polish [US] | | 2.5–3.5 lb (1.1–1.6 kg) | erect |
| Lionhead | | 1.36–1.7 lb (0.62–0.77 kg) | erect |
| Miniature Lion Lop | | 1.5–1.6 lb (0.68–0.73 kg) | lop |
| Miniature Lop [UK/NL] | | 3.4–3.8 lb (1.5–1.7 kg) | lop |
| Miniature Cashmere Lop | | 3.5 lb (1.6 kg) | lop |
| American Fuzzy Lop | | 3.5–4.0 lb (1.6–1.8 kg) | lop |
| Plush Lop (Miniature) | | 1.7–1.8 lb (0.77–0.82 kg) | lop |

== See also ==
- Cuniculture
- House rabbit
- Lethal dwarfism in rabbits
- Lop rabbit
