= Lionhead rabbit =

Breed of domestic rabbit

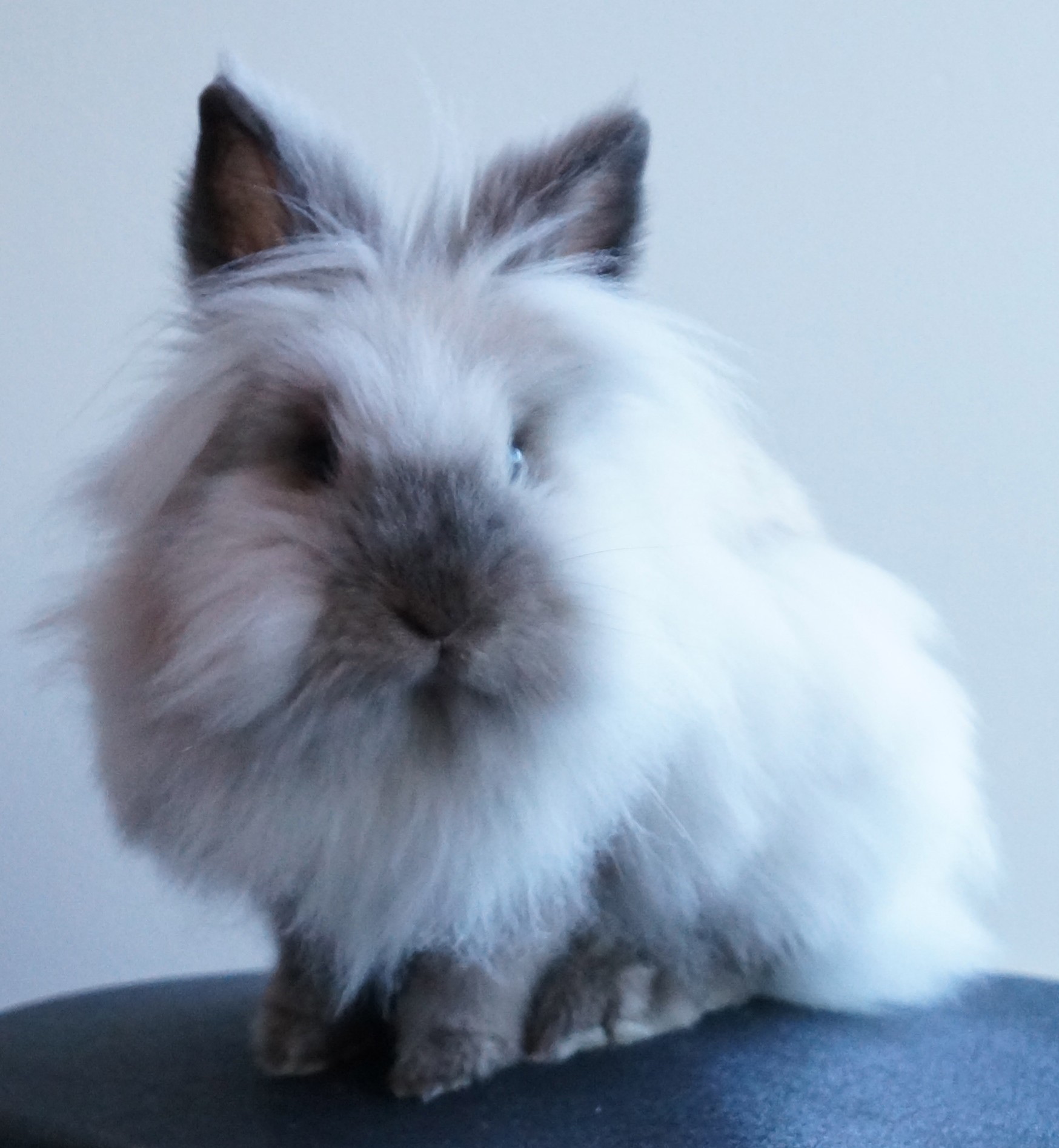
The most eye-catching factor of a lionhead rabbit is the fluffy mane around its head. Pictured is a double mane sable point lionhead rabbit.

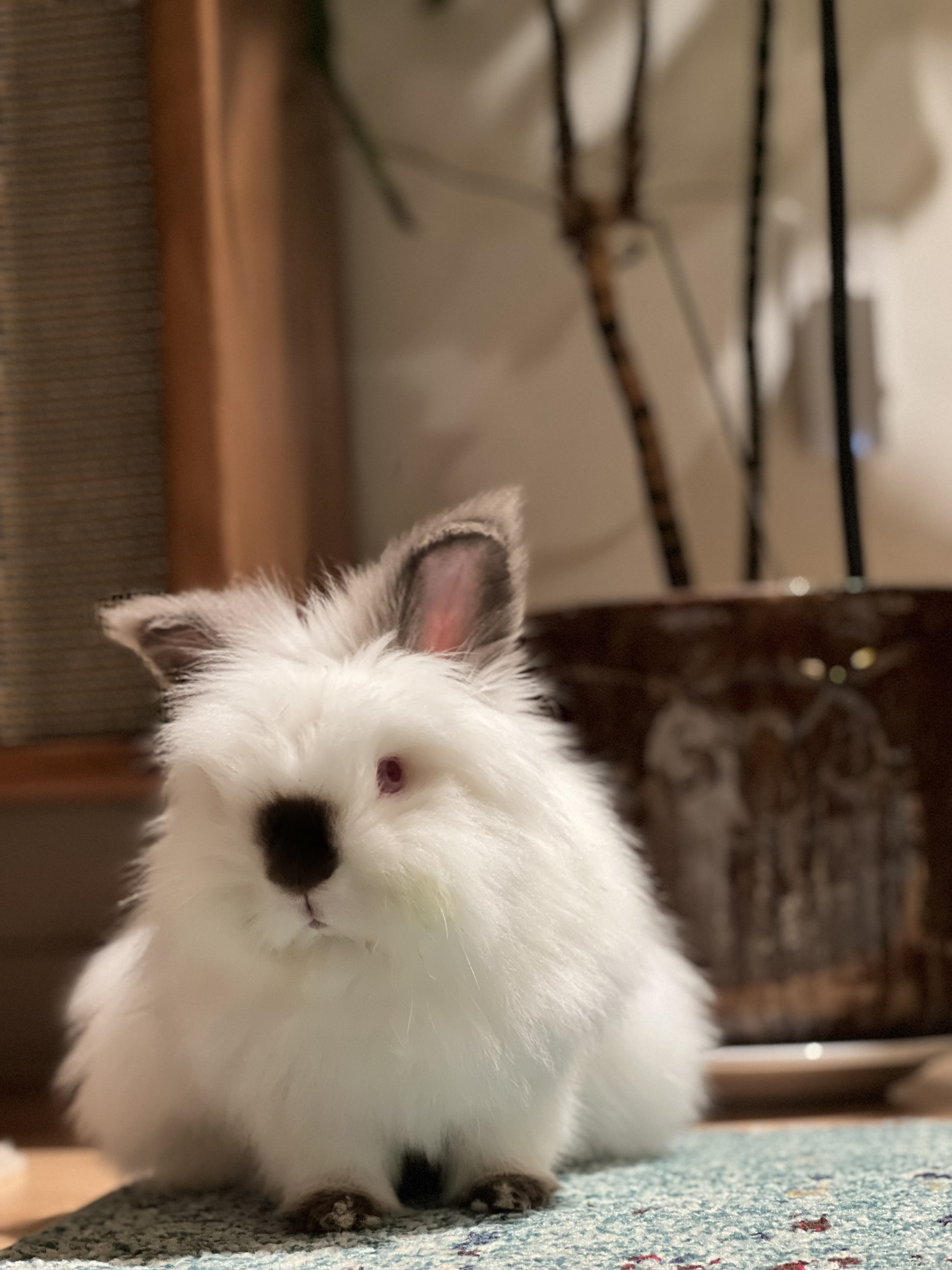
A photo of a white Lionhead Rabbit with a black nose

Lionhead is a breed of domestic rabbit recognized by the British Rabbit Council (BRC) and by the American Rabbit Breeders Association (ARBA). The Lionhead rabbit has a wool mane encircling the head, reminiscent of a male lion as its name implies, as well as a skirt of wool circling the flank of the rabbit. Other Lionhead characteristics include a high head mount, compact upright body type, short well-furred 2- to 3 1/2-inch ears, a fur saddle on their backs, and a weight of 2.5 to 3.75 pounds. Accepted varieties include: REW (Ruby-Eyed White), black, tort (black, blue, lilac, chocolate), chocolate, seal, Siamese Sable, and Smoke Pearl.

== History ==
The Lionhead rabbit originated in France and Belgium; although it is not recognized by the French Federation of Cuniculture. It is reported to have been produced by breeders trying to breed a long-coated dwarf rabbit by crossing a miniature Swiss Fox and a Netherland dwarf. This resulted in a genetic mutation causing wool to appear around the head and on the flanks. This gene has come to be known as the "mane" gene. There are many other reports similar to this, for example, that the lionhead has been bred from a Netherland Dwarf and a Jersey Wooly, but none have been substantiated, since the mane gene is separate from the gene that creates wool coats in wooled rabbits. The Lionhead rabbit continued to gain popularity in Europe, and Lionheads found their way to the United States in the late 1990s.

In the United Kingdom, the BRC has recognized the Lionhead breed since 2002.

In 2013 the Lionhead was accepted as a recognized breed by ARBA in two varieties: Tortoise and Ruby-Eyed White. As of 1 February 2014, Lionheads have been eligible to compete for Best in Show and to receive legs toward Grand Champion.

The North American Lionhead Rabbit Club (NALRC) holds its annual Lionhead Exhibition Specialty show in Columbus, Ohio. Typically, the Lionhead breed is represented by approximately 300-500 entries and 50-80 exhibitors from all over the United States and Canada.

== Mane types ==
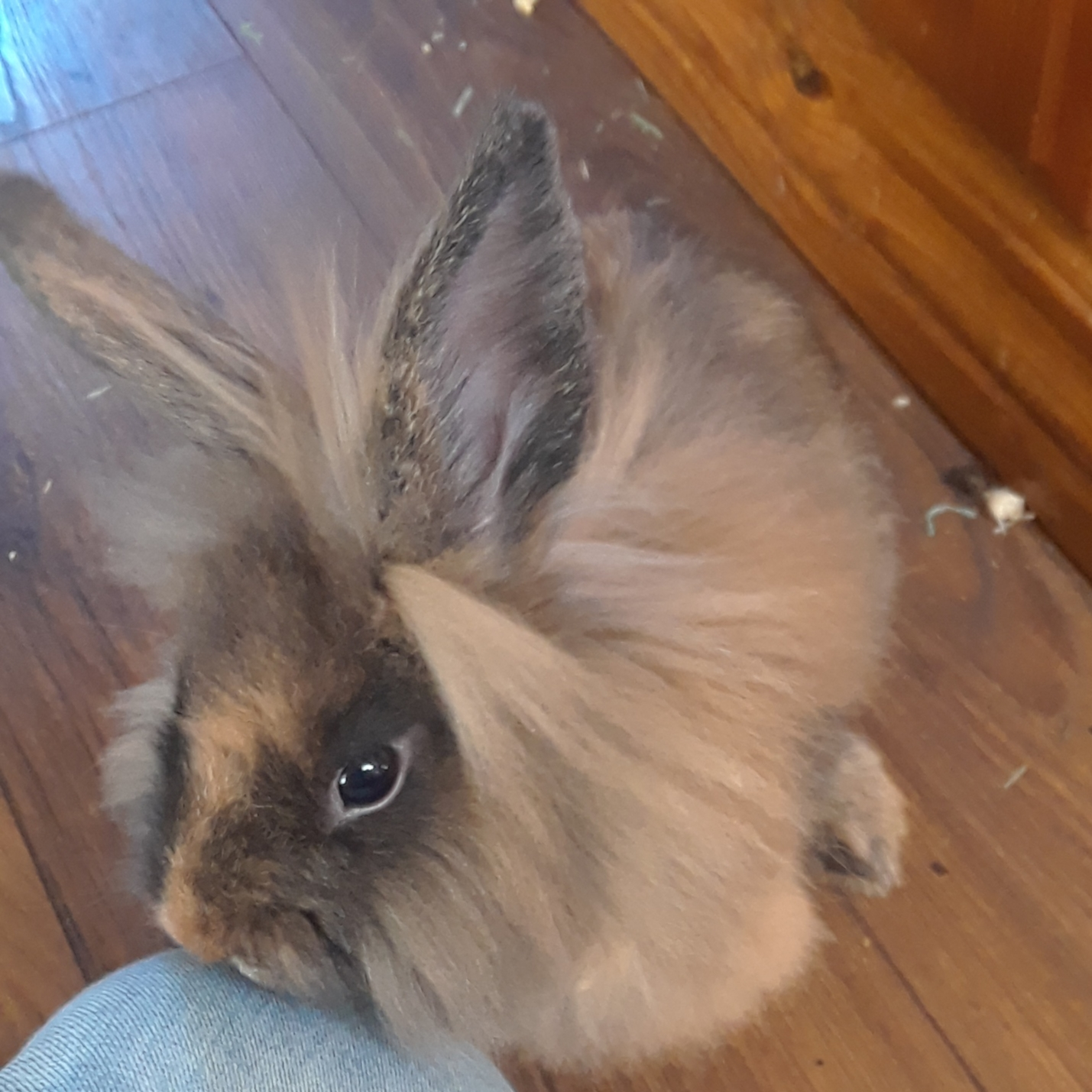
A young Lionhead mix rabbit

Typically, the mane is thick, woolly and soft with evident "crimping". Depending on the number of genes a Lionhead gets from each parent, it can have a double mane (two mane genes) or a single mane (one mane gene). A double mane Lionhead will have a noticeable V form around their skirt/flanks, while a single mane will look like a common rabbit directly after birth. The only way to determine double vs single-maned Lionheads is at birth. If they have a "V" shaped flank, they are double. If not, they are single. Past then, many factors contribute to how much mane each individual actually ends up having including chewing on the mane by themselves or others and matts.

=== Single maned ===
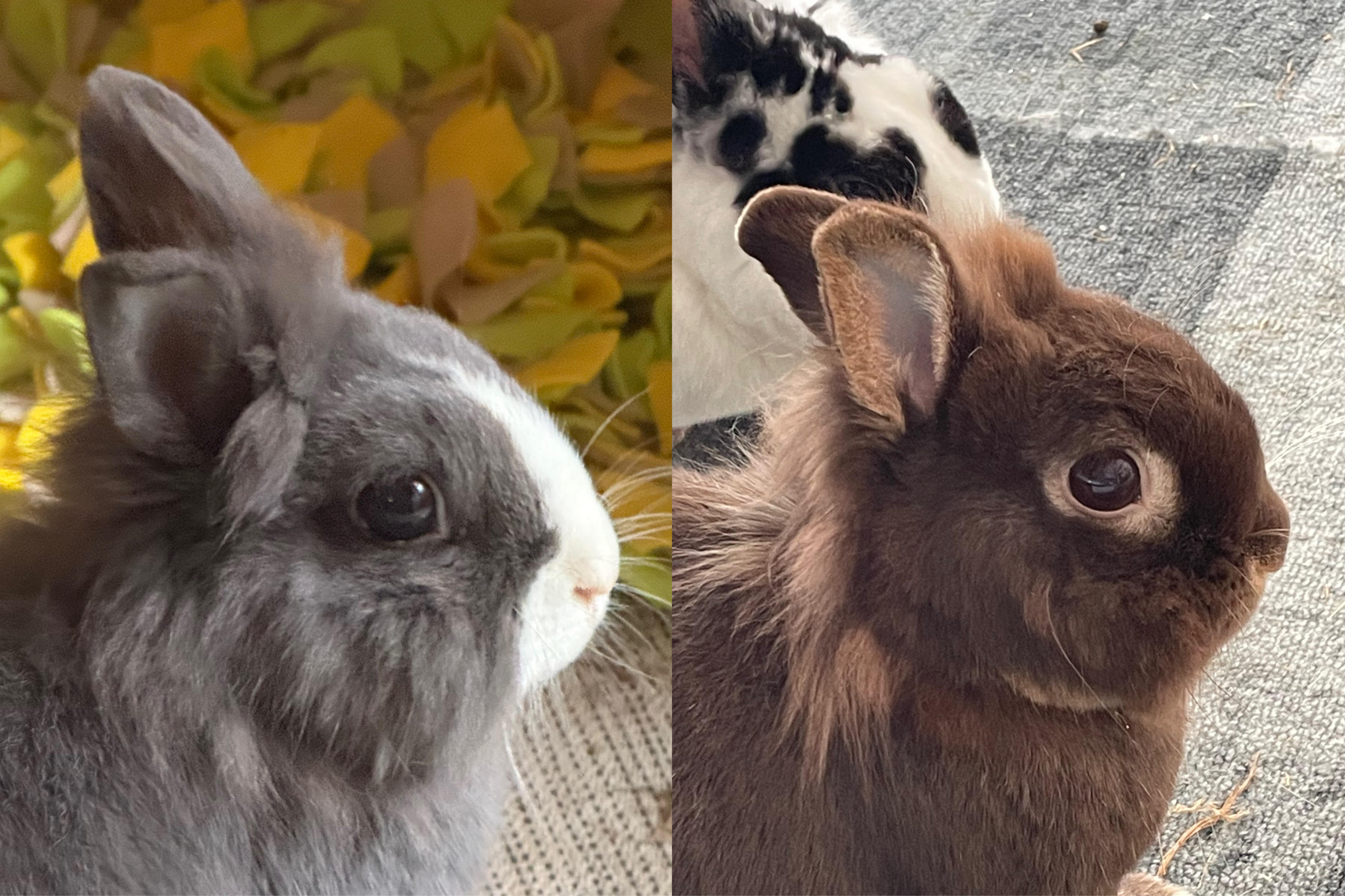
Two single maned Lionheads showing different breed influences, namely Dutch rabbit on the left, and Netherlands Dwarf rabbit on the right.

Single mane Lionhead rabbits only have one copy of the mane gene. These Lionheads typically do not hold a mane for their entire lifetime, if it develops at all. They have a mane that can be around its head, ears, chin and sometimes on the chest and rump. The mane may be wispy and thin and may disappear on some rabbits altogether as they mature.

Single maned Lionheads are usually the product of a Purebred Double mane Lionhead being bred to a rabbit of another breed in order to strengthen a particular characteristic, or to introduce a particular color into the Lionhead breed. Kits born without a copy of the mane gene are called "no maned."

=== Temperament and bonding ===
In most cases the Lionhead is a friendly and well mannered pet, although they can be skittish if they don't feel safe. It is possible to train a Lionhead as they are intelligent creatures. They can comprehend certain orders such as, come, play, and eat. Clicker training is now becoming popular. Lionhead rabbits can be litter trained, and make suitable house rabbits. These rabbits can be aggressive and prone to attacks when they feel threatened or scared.

== See also ==
- List of rabbit breeds
