= Silver Marten rabbit =

Breed of rabbit

Black Silver Marten

The Silver Marten is a breed of domestic rabbit. Although they are raised to compete in pet shows and agricultural shows, they are also regarded as "loveable and charming" pets.

== Description ==
The Silver Marten is a medium-sized rabbit that weighs between 6.5 and 8.5 lbs. when fully grown. They are hardy and have fur that is described as soft "with a beautiful polished look to it". While more timid than some larger breeds of rabbit, they are still considered an excellent pet. The Silver Marten is playful, enjoys romping around, and likes playthings it can toss around its cage.

== History ==
Early breeders of Chinchilla rabbits, a breed listed as critical on the American Livestock Breeds Conservancy Conservation Priority List, attempted to improve Chinchilla rabbits' color and pattern by introducing black and tan bloodlines. These genes later manifested as black "sports" described as "strange little black rabbits" as well as similar silver rabbits among standard Chinchilla rabbit litters. These oddities bred true and were named as a separate breed, the "Silver Marten", in 1924.

In 1927, a working standard for black and chocolate varieties was established by the American Rabbit Breeders' Association and the first Silver Marten Club was chartered. A blue variety of this breed was accepted in 1933. The sable variety, the last to be approved, was accepted in 1993.

== Varieties ==
- Black Silver Marten is the most popular variety of the breed. Specimens should be jet black color, its fur being black as far down the hair as possible, with contrasting silver markings that are shape and defined. A Black Silver Marten should have dark brown eyes and an underside of dark slate blue.
- Blue Silver Marten is the second most popular breed. Their color should be an even dark "blue" everywhere. Their eyes should be bluish gray. Sharp markings in the blue variety are often slower to fully develop than in the Blue Silver Marten.
- Chocolate Silver Martens should be a rich, dark brown color "like semi-sweet rather than milk chocolate candy" and brown eyes. Their bellies are the same color but lighter, with pigment only at the tips of the fur. Breeders say that their fur has a tendency to fade over time, especially if given much sunlight.
- Sable Silver Martens, the last variety of the breed to be approved, are the least common. They should be medium sepia brown "on the saddle, shading evenly down the sides to a lighter color". The rabbit's ears, face, tail, outside of the feet, and lower legs should be very dark sepia brown, nearly black, that provides a distinct contrast to the color of the body. Correctly colored sables must be a silvery color at birth, but as they age they take on a blotchy appearance. The coat typically darkens throughout the rabbit's lifetime, each successive molt reducing the contrast with the points.

Silver Marten are a compatible breed for introducing color into Dwarf Rabbit bloodlines.

== See also ==
- List of rabbit breeds
