= Florida White rabbit =

Breed of rabbit

The Florida White is a relatively small breed of rabbit. They are all white in color with no other markings, and have Albino red or pink eyes. They are a recognized American Rabbit Breeders Association (ARBA) breed.

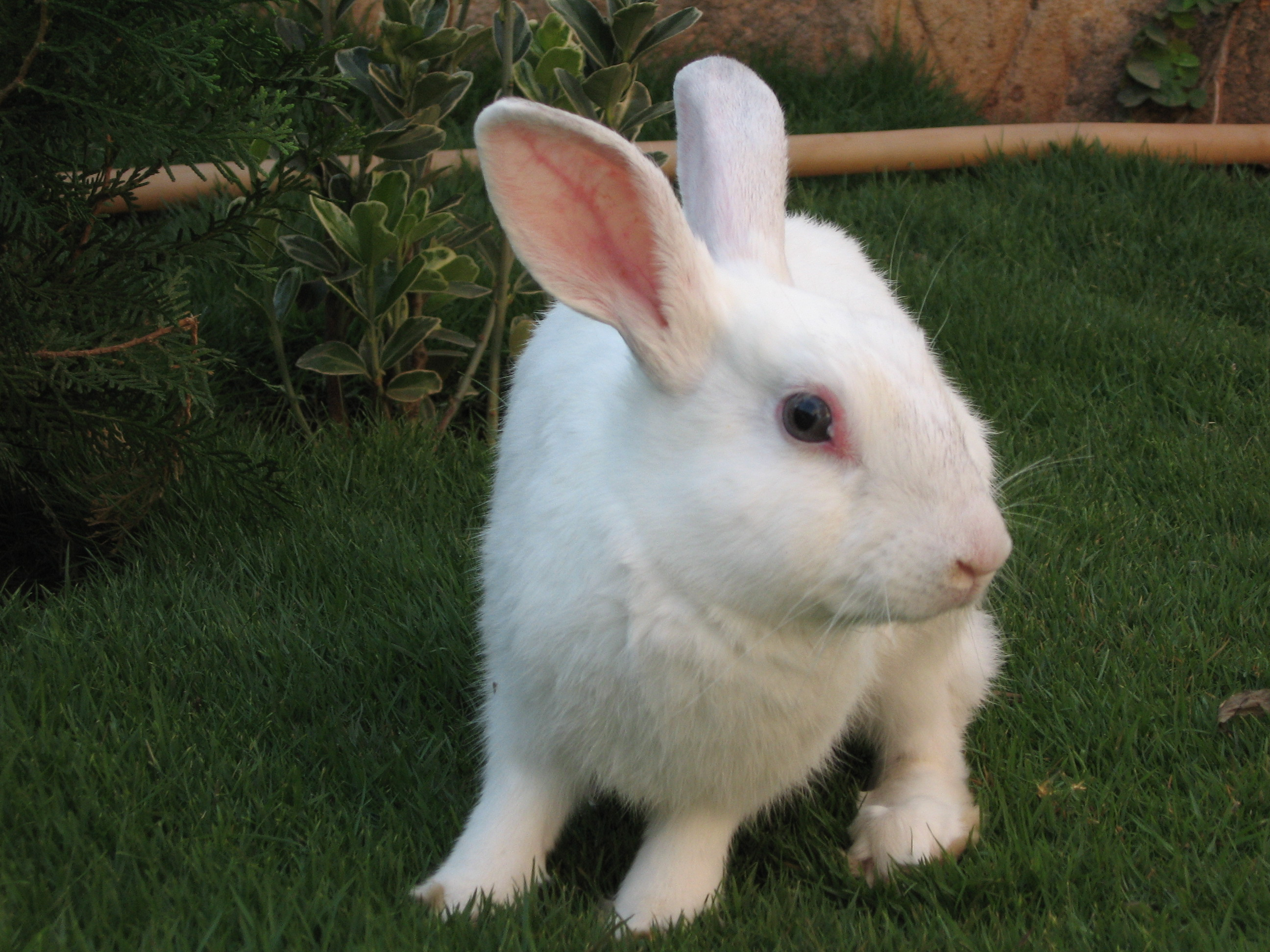
Florida White next to a bush

== History of the breed ==
The Florida White rabbit was accepted as a breed by the ARBA in 1967. The breed originator was ARBA Judge Orville Miliken. He crossed an albino Dutch, an albino Polish and a small but "typie" (sic) New Zealand white and through progressive selection and line breeding produced a strain of compact animals.

The Florida White was developed to provide a smaller rabbit for owners use and provide a rabbit with good production and a favorable dress-out ratio for the personal consumption home breeder of today.

They have a compact body with firm flesh, small bones, small heads and small feet, excellent speed and running conversion, and a nearly 65% meat-to-bone ratio. This means there is very little problems in processing.

The Florida White is also an excellent show animal. The Florida White Standard of Perfection, which is available from the ARBA, describes the point system used to judge the Florida White. The number one consideration in showing the Florida White is the body or type which carries 65 points, though the condition of the rabbit which would include firm flesh and fur, carries 35 points.

The fur is white with good density and texture, and they have a compact, short neck, and small head. The ideal senior weight for the breed is 5 pounds, with an acceptable range from 4-6 pounds, while the junior weighs 2.25-4.5 pounds.

Florida Whites are generally docile, good-natured, gentle and relaxed rabbits. This breed is generally hardy and healthy. They have an average lifespan of 5 to 8 years.

== See also ==
- Domestic rabbit
- List of rabbit breeds
