= Florida White House (disambiguation) =

Florida White House may refer to:

- Nixon's Florida White House, a compound in Key Biscayne, Florida, used by US President Richard Nixon
- Harry S. Truman Little White House, the winter residence of US President Truman for 175 days during 11 visits
- Mar-a-Lago, a resort and National Historic Landmark in Palm Beach, Florida, owned by Donald Trump since 1985 and used by him frequently during his US presidency

== See also ==
- List of residences of presidents of the United States
