= Jersey Wooly =

Breed of rabbit

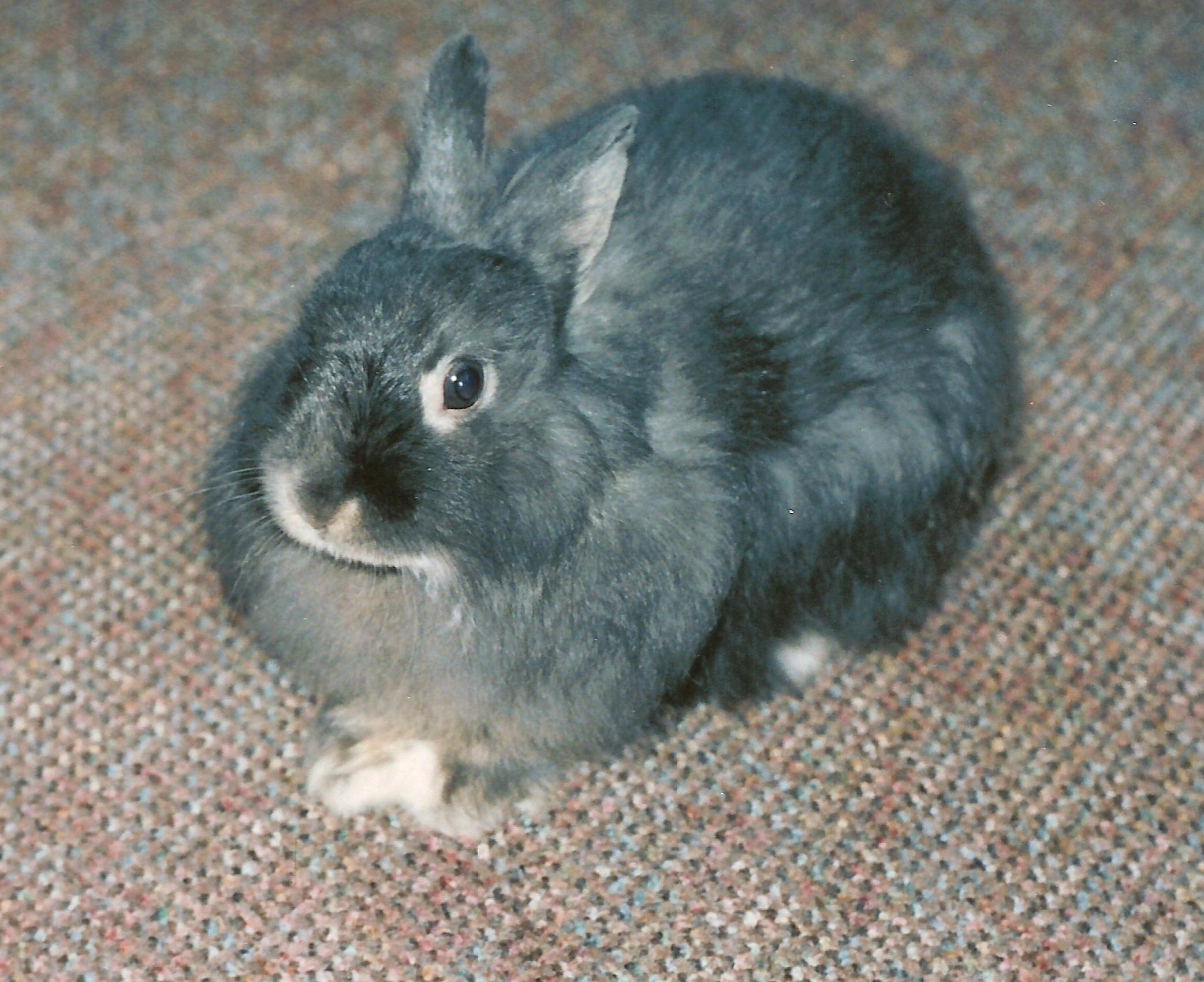
Pet Jersey Wooly rabbit

The Jersey Wooly is a breed of domestic rabbit weighing about 3 pounds with a bold head and wool fur on their body.

== Origins ==
Bonnie Seeley of High Bridge, New Jersey bred the Jersey Wooly starting in the 1970s from a Chinchilla buck and a black Silver Marten doe with a dwarfing gene. A Blue rabbit doe, without the dwarfing gene, was also involved in the breeding process. These early rabbits maintained the oblong body shape of the French Angora. By 1981, Seeley was mating the rabbits to Netherland Dwarfs, which produced the more petit representatives of the breed that would make their first appearance at the 1984 American Rabbit Breeders Association (ARBA) Convention in Orlando, Florida. The breed was recognized by the ARBA in 1988 at the Madison, Wisconsin, convention.

A separate breed of Jersey Wooly was under development in New Zealand as of 2004 and was pending the approval of the Rabbit Council of New Zealand.

== Appearance and personality ==
A full grown Jersey Wooly weighs 1–1.5 kg (2.5–3.5 pounds) with 3 pounds being considered ideal. They have a compact body type. The ears are small and erect, standing about 2 1/2 inches long. 3 inch ears are the maximum length allowed for exhibition stock per the ARBA's Standard of Perfection. When showing a Jersey Wooly, the head and ears have the most points. The head is bold and squarish which led the breed to being affectionately referred to as the "Mug Head." These rabbits are very affectionate and playful and most Jersey Woolys have very friendly personalities. As pets, they range from laid-back lap bunnies to outgoing explorers.

The ease of care of the rabbit's coat is a point of popularity for the Jersey Wooly among small breeds.

== Lifespan ==
The average life span of a Jersey Wooly can depend on many factors, including genetics and care. It is not uncommon for a Jersey Wooly to live 7-10+ years when properly cared for. There is a common myth that those who have had litters die sooner, but this has not been scientifically proven. Many rabbit breeders have healthy Jersey Woolys who have had multiple litters live just as long as pet Jersey Woolys who have never had babies. It is also believed that neutering and spaying these rabbits will add years to their life span. Without neutering or spaying, rabbits can develop cancer and tumors that are life-threatening. A competent, experienced exotics veterinarian is the best way to minimize surgical complications.

== See also ==
- American Rabbit Breeders Association
- List of rabbit breeds
- National Jersey Wooly Rabbit Club
- M an' M Rabbitry
