= Australian Lowline =

Australian breed of cattle

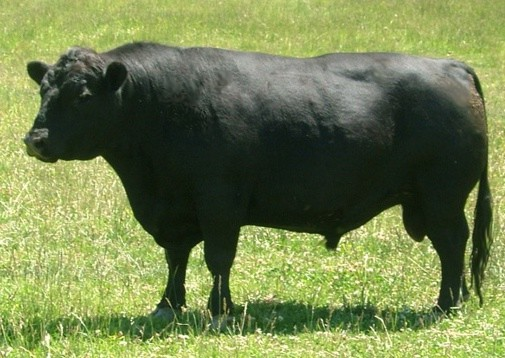
- Bull
- Conservation status: FAO (2007): no data; DAD-IS (2026): at risk/endangered
- Other names: Lowline; Lowline Angus
- Country of origin: Australia
- Standard: Australian Lowline Cattle Association
- Use: beef

Traits
- Weight: Male: 400 kg; Female: 323 kg
- Height: Male: 110 cm; Female: 100 cm
- Coat: solid black, occasionally solid red
- Horn status: polled
- Cattle; Bos (primigenius) taurus

The Australian Lowline is a modern Australian breed of small, polled beef cattle. It was the result of a selective breeding experiment using black Aberdeen Angus cattle at the Agricultural Research Centre of the Department of Agriculture of New South Wales at Trangie. It is among the smallest breeds of cattle, but is not a dwarf breed.

== History ==
In 1929 the Department of Agriculture of New South Wales started an Aberdeen Angus herd at the Agricultural Research Centre at Trangie with stock imported from Canada. Various additions to the herd were made, from Canada, from the United States, from the United Kingdom and from other herds in Australia, until the herd-book was closed in 1964. From about this time, various research projects were conducted at Trangie. In 1974 an investigation was begun of the correlation between growth rate and profitability, and of whether feed conversion efficiency was higher in large or in small animals fed on grass.

In the study, three separate herds were established: one of animals with a high rate of growth in their first year, one with animals that had shown low growth, and one randomly selected as a control group. These were called the High Line, the Low Line and the Control Line respectively. The Low Line herd started with 85 cows and some young bulls, and was closed to additions of other stock from 1974; it eventually numbered more than 400 head. To exclude possible effects of climate from the study, some stock was reared at Glen Innes in northern New South Wales and at Hamilton, Victoria. The experiment ran for nineteen years, by the end of which the Low Line animals were on average some 30% smaller than the High Line group.

When the experiment ended in the early 1990s, the Lowline stock was auctioned off. A breeders' association, the Australian Lowline Cattle Association, was formed in 1992, and the first herd-book was published in 1993; it listed 150 cows and 36 bulls.

Australia is the only country which reports Lowline cattle to DAD-IS; the breeders' association has members in Canada, New Zealand, the United Kingdom and the United States.

== Characteristics ==
The Australian Lowline is among the smallest of cattle breeds, but is not affected by dwarfism. Height is about 60% of that of the normal Aberdeen Angus breed, or about 110 cm for bulls and 100 cm for cows. Calves average about 22 kg at birth, but may weigh as little as 14 kg. The coat is usually solid black, but may also be solid red; some white colouring in the area of the scrotum or udder is tolerated. The cattle are naturally polled and are quiet-tempered. They adapt well to varying climatic conditions. Cows calve easily and provide plenty of milk to their young.

Compared to larger cattle, the Lowline does less damage to pasture land, and does not need such high or strong fencing.

== Use ==
The Australian Lowline is reared for beef. The meat is tender; the killing-out percentage is high.
