= Netherland Dwarf rabbit =

Breed of rabbit

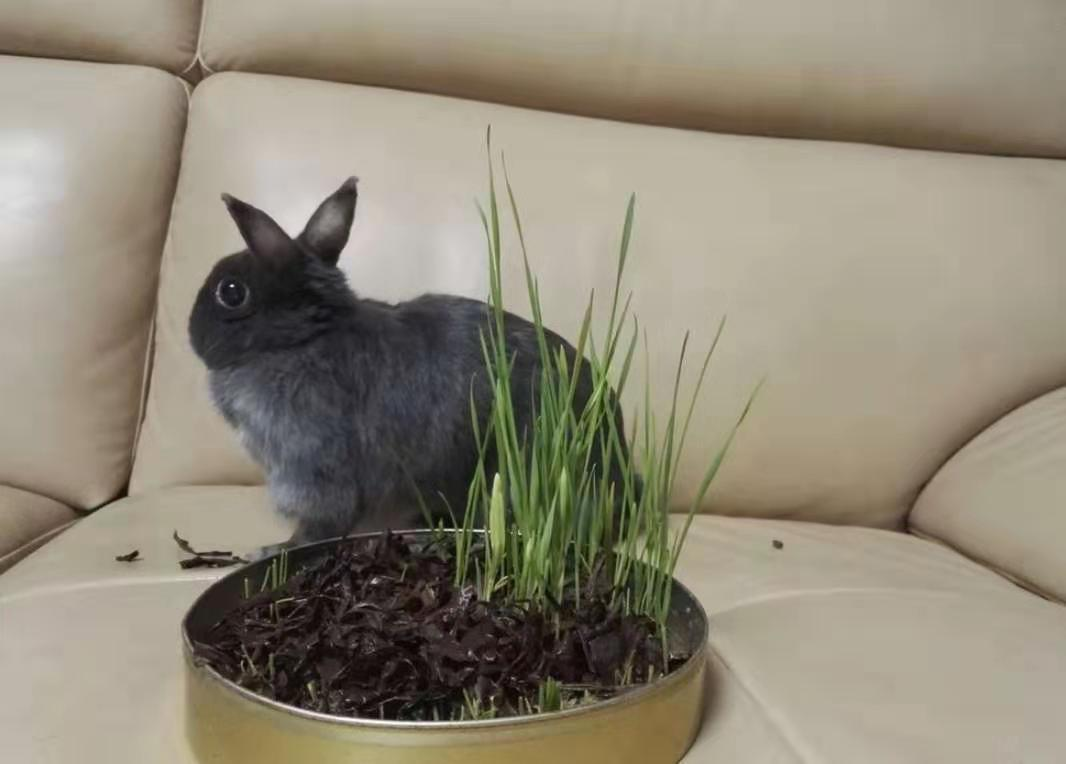
- Country of origin: Netherlands
- Distribution: Worldwide

Traits
- Weight: 1.1–2.5 pounds (0.50–1.13 kg)
- Coat: Short, Fine
- Lifespan: 7-10 years

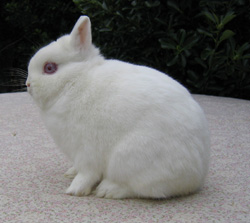
A Netherland Dwarf rabbit; note the short ears, brachycephalic head and cobby body. Ruby-eyed white colour variety

The Netherland Dwarf is a breed of domestic rabbit that originated in the Netherlands. Weighing 1.1–2.5 pounds (0.50–1.13 kg), the Netherland Dwarf is one of the smallest rabbit breeds. Its popularity as a pet or show rabbit may stem from its neotenic appearance. The Netherland Dwarf is recognised by both the American Rabbit Breeders Association (ARBA) and the British Rabbit Council (BRC). The Netherland Dwarf is often confused with the Polish breed of rabbit, but the latter has longer ears, a non-brachycephalic head and less cobbiness. There are also different groups within the breed, such as: true dwarfs, false dwarfs and a group with a nickname "Peanuts". True dwarfs have one allele for dwarfism out of the two which makes it smaller than a false dwarf, true dwarfs are the ideal Netherland dwarf. False dwarfs have zero alleles for dwarfism out of the two which makes them larger than usual. Peanuts have two alleles for dwarfism, which can happen if two true dwarfs breed together. This causes the rabbit to be abnormally small and often die as in nearly all cases they can not drink their mother's milk.

== History ==
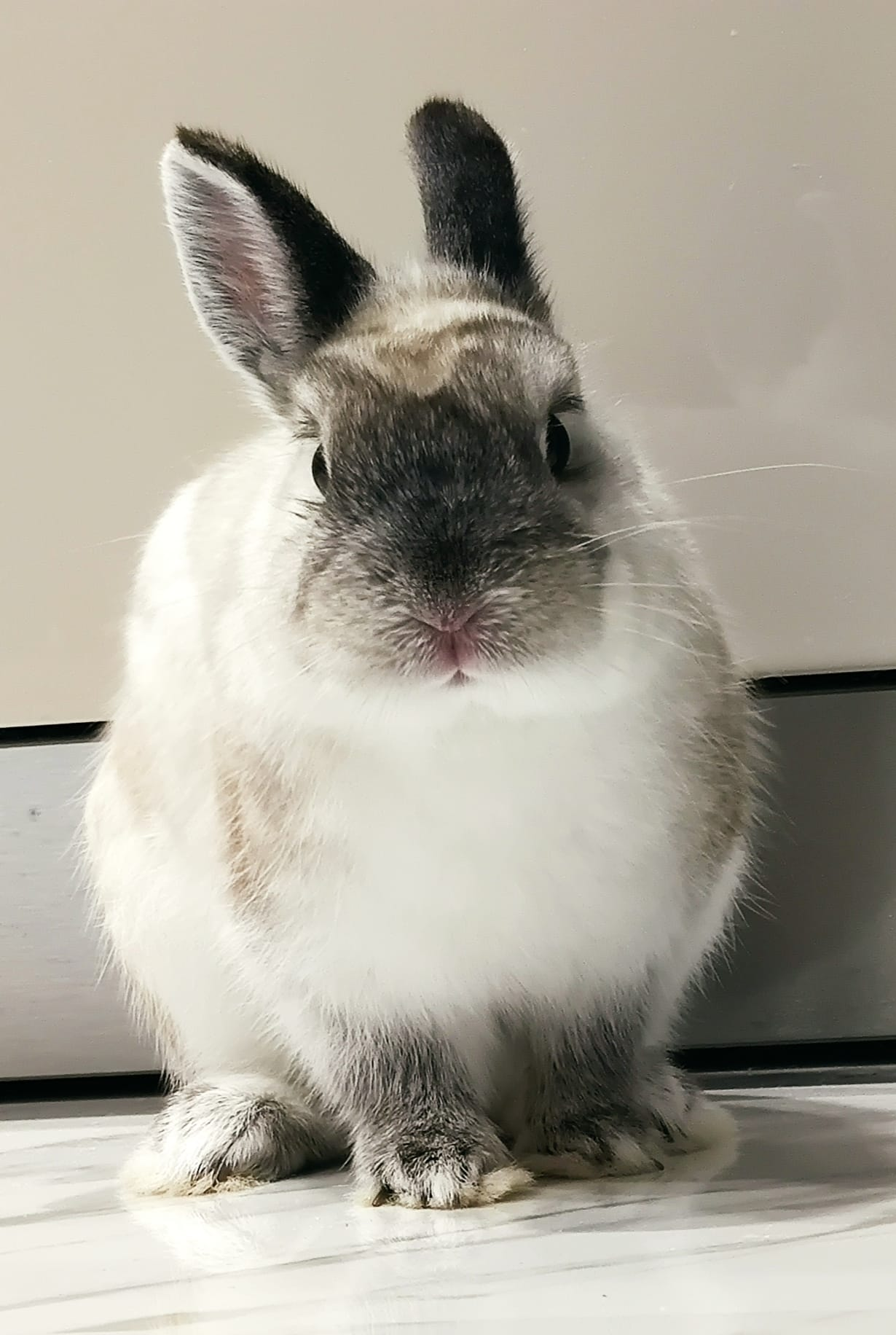
An adult Netherland Dwarf rabbit in Sable Point colour.

The Netherland Dwarf breed was first produced in the Netherlands in the early 20th century. Small Polish rabbits were bred with smaller wild rabbits; after several generations the resulting animal was a very small domestic rabbit available in a wide variety of colours and patterns. Netherland Dwarfs were first imported into the United Kingdom in 1948. In the 1960s and 1970s the United States imported its first Netherland Dwarf rabbits. The breed was accepted by the American Rabbit Breeders Association in 1969 using a modification of the British standard.

Early dwarfs, even into the 1970s and 1980s, had fearful and sometimes aggressive temperaments. This was a result of breeders selecting wild breeding animals for their size. The first dwarf rabbits behaved more like these wild rabbits than domestic animals and were not good pets. However, through generations of selective breeding, the modern Netherland Dwarf has become a gentle, friendly pet rabbit, though it still can retain a more energetic disposition than larger breeds.

11-week-old Netherland Dwarf rabbit. (Vienna Marked Black Otter)

== Appearance ==
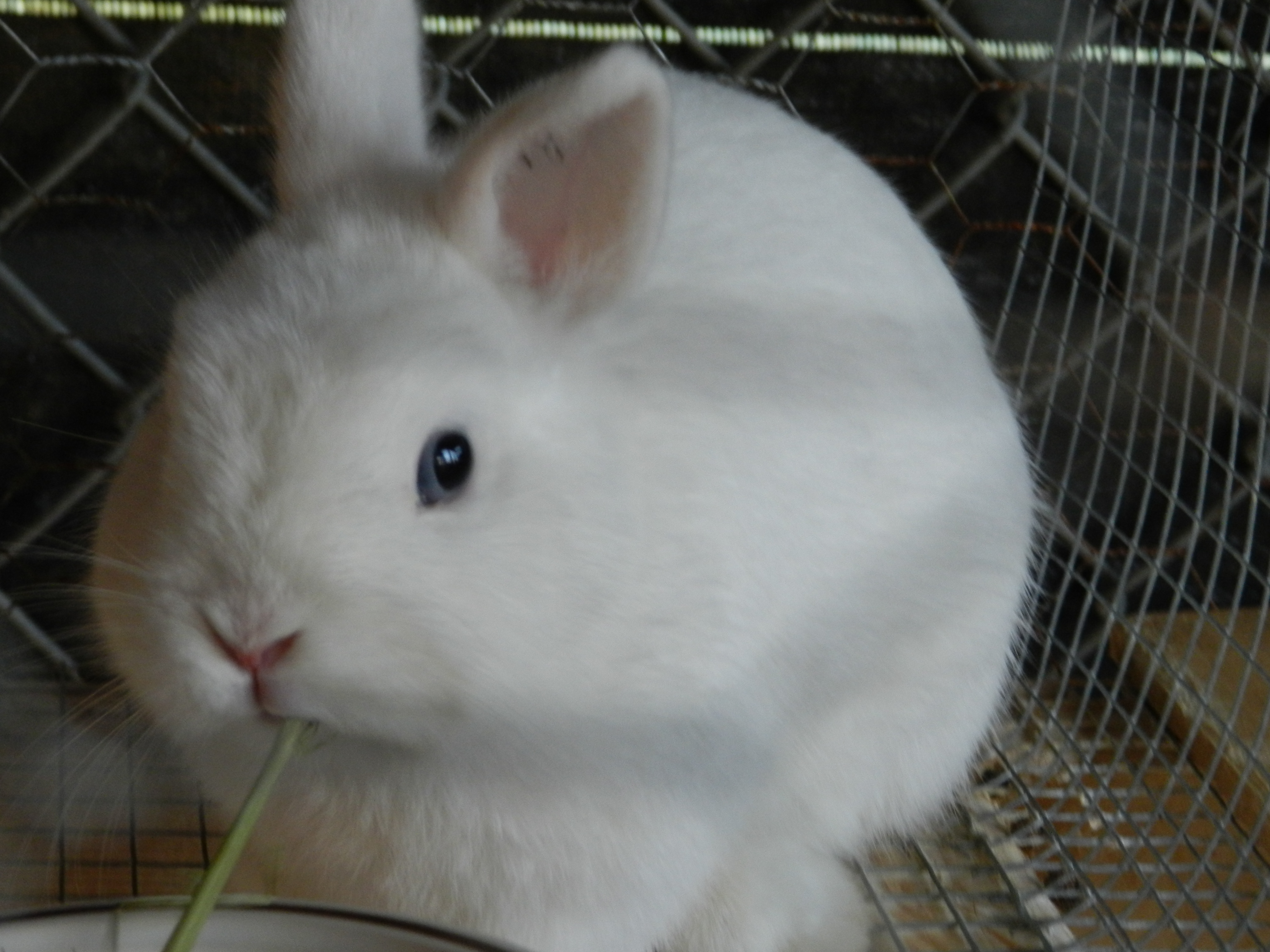
Young blue-eyed-white Netherland Dwarf eating timothy hay.

The Netherland Dwarf's head and eyes are disproportionately large with respect to its short-coupled and stout ("cobby") body. Its ears are notably short and carried high on the head and its face is rounded and brachycephalic. These neotenic features, a result of dwarfism, cause the Netherland Dwarf to retain an infantile appearance even into adulthood.

1½ year old red-eyed-white (REW) Netherland Dwarf.

The Netherland Dwarf has been bred in a wide variety of colours including: Ruby Eyed White, Blue Eyed White, Black, Blue, Chocolate, Lilac, Red, Siamese Sable, Siamese Smoke, Sealpoint, Sable Point, Blue Point, Chocolate Point, Tortoiseshell, Agouti, Red Agouti, Opal, Cinnamon, Lynx, Chinchilla, Squirrel, Tan, Marten Sable, Marten Smoke, Black Otter, Blue Otter, Chocolate Otter, Lilac Otter, Fox, Orange, Fawn, Hotot, Himalayan, Harlequin, Magpie, Broken, Butterfly and Mantle EMD.

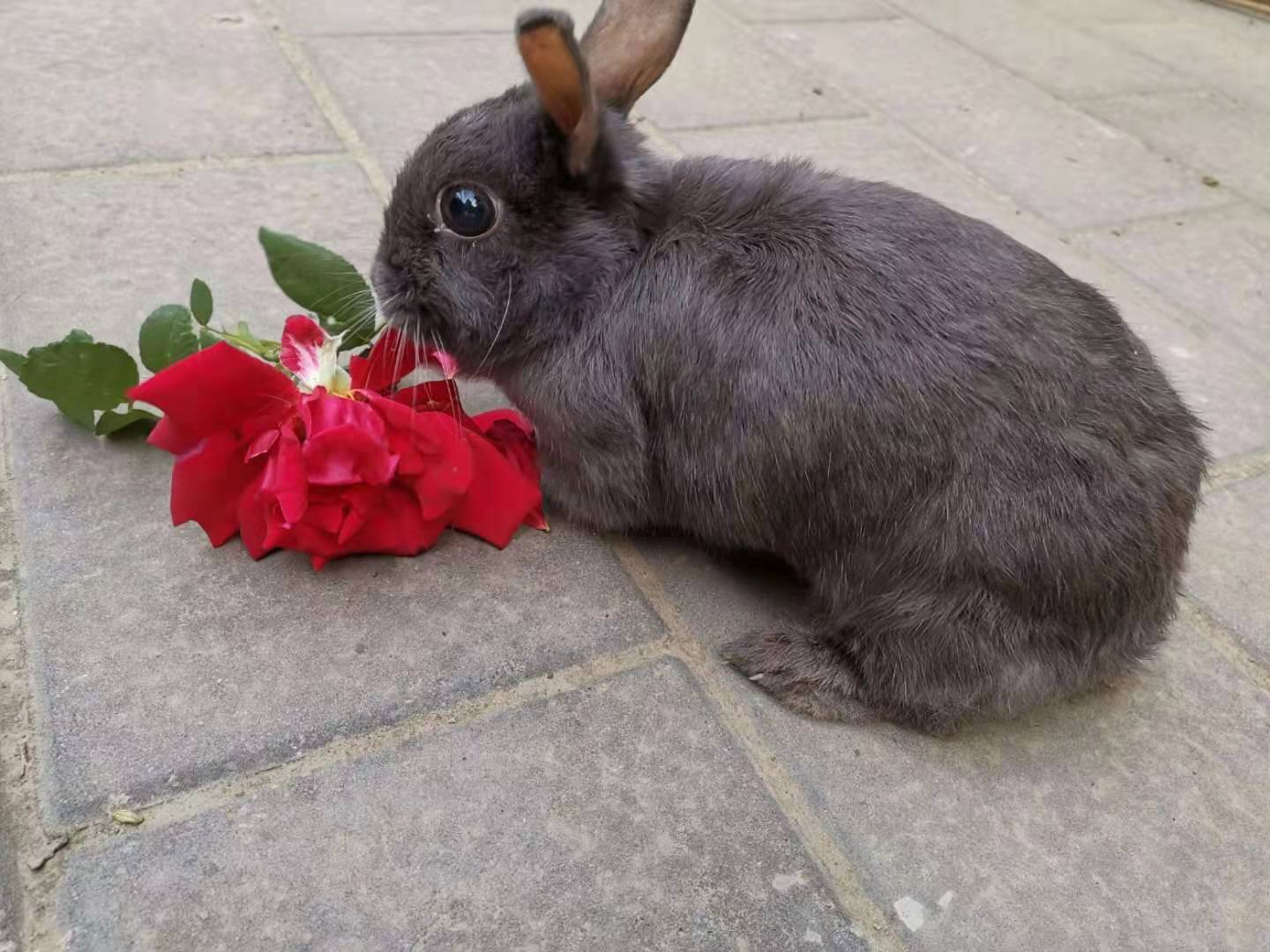
A 7 year old Netherland Dwarf.

== As pets ==
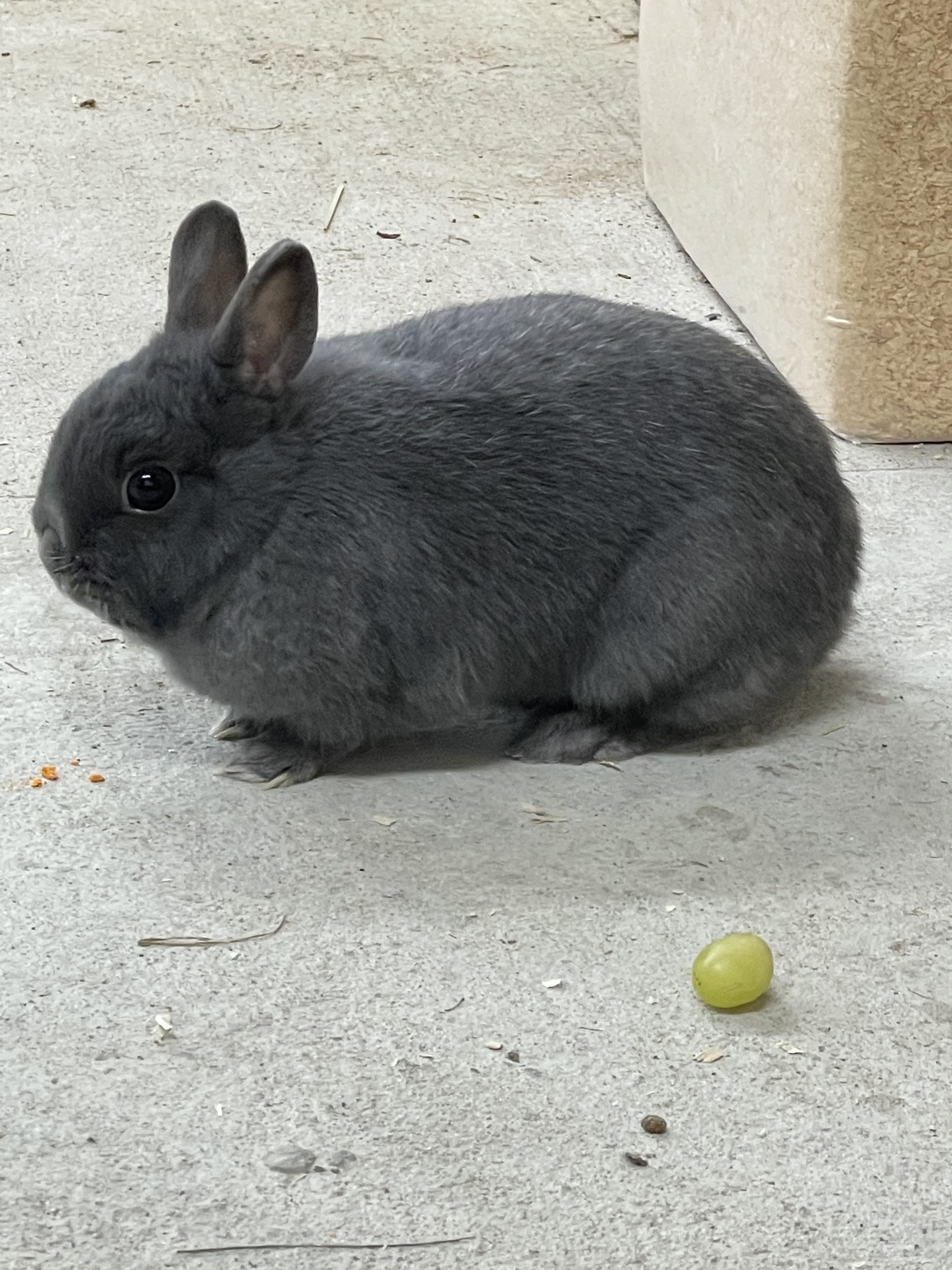
A grey Netherland Dwarf rabbit, 2 years old

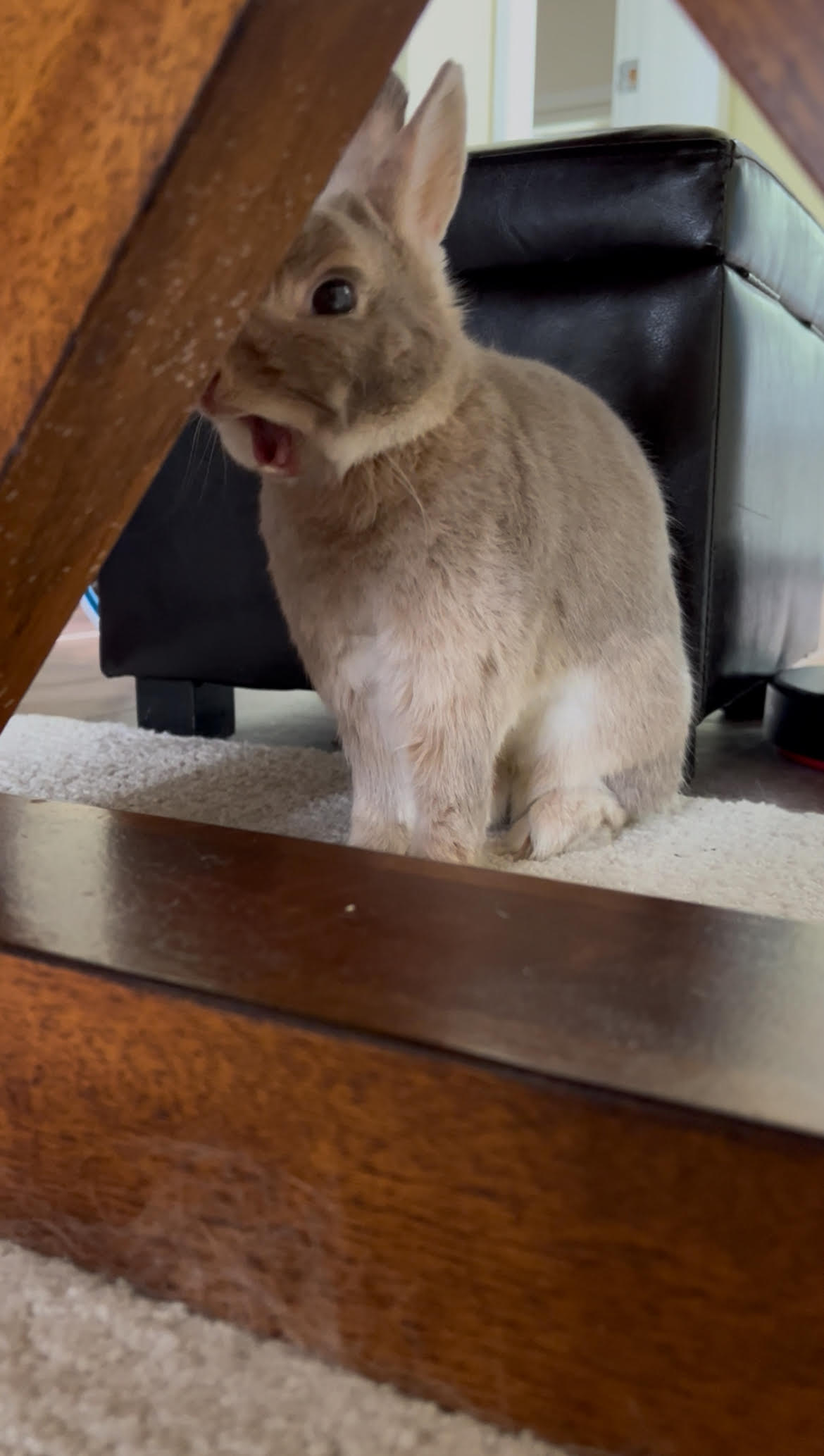
A 10 years old Netherland Dwarf rabbit yawning

Due to their size and overall disposition, Netherlands Dwarfs often do not make good pets for children although suitability will vary between individual rabbits. Small children, who may play with or pick up the rabbit to cuddle it, are generally not suited to the animal; dwarf rabbits do not like to be picked up or held tightly, and may bite, scratch or struggle wildly if the child does so. This often leads to accidents if the child drops them out of fright, which can then lead to injuries due to the fragile nature of rabbit bones. Larger breeds of rabbits are instead recommended for children, because they have fewer issues with temperament. However, it's possible for dwarf rabbits to learn to enjoy being held and cuddled, if properly trained as a baby with patience and care.

Dwarf rabbits can make excellent pets for adults. They thrive in a quiet, stable environment with plenty of human interaction. They are trainable, quiet and clean. Grooming needs are minimal, but rabbits will typically enjoy a daily brushing. Time is needed to bond with the rabbit and to build trust, because dwarf breeds are often more nervous and more aloof than larger breeds. However, when the rabbit has bonded with their owner, they make affectionate pets.

The expected lifespan of domesticated Netherland Dwarfs is 7–10 years.

== Behaviour ==
Netherland Dwarf rabbits can be litter-trained, as they have a natural tendency to choose the same spot for their droppings, and a much higher intelligence than most rabbits, making it easier to litter train them.

Netherland Dwarfs can be skittish, wild and/or of a disagreeable nature. This is a leftover stereotype from the beginnings of the breed. This has changed through selective breeding; however, they are skittish and aloof. They are extremely active and energetic, requiring the same amount of exercise as other breeds of rabbit. They also have a higher tendency towards nervousness and stress. As with any species, disposition will vary from individual to individual.

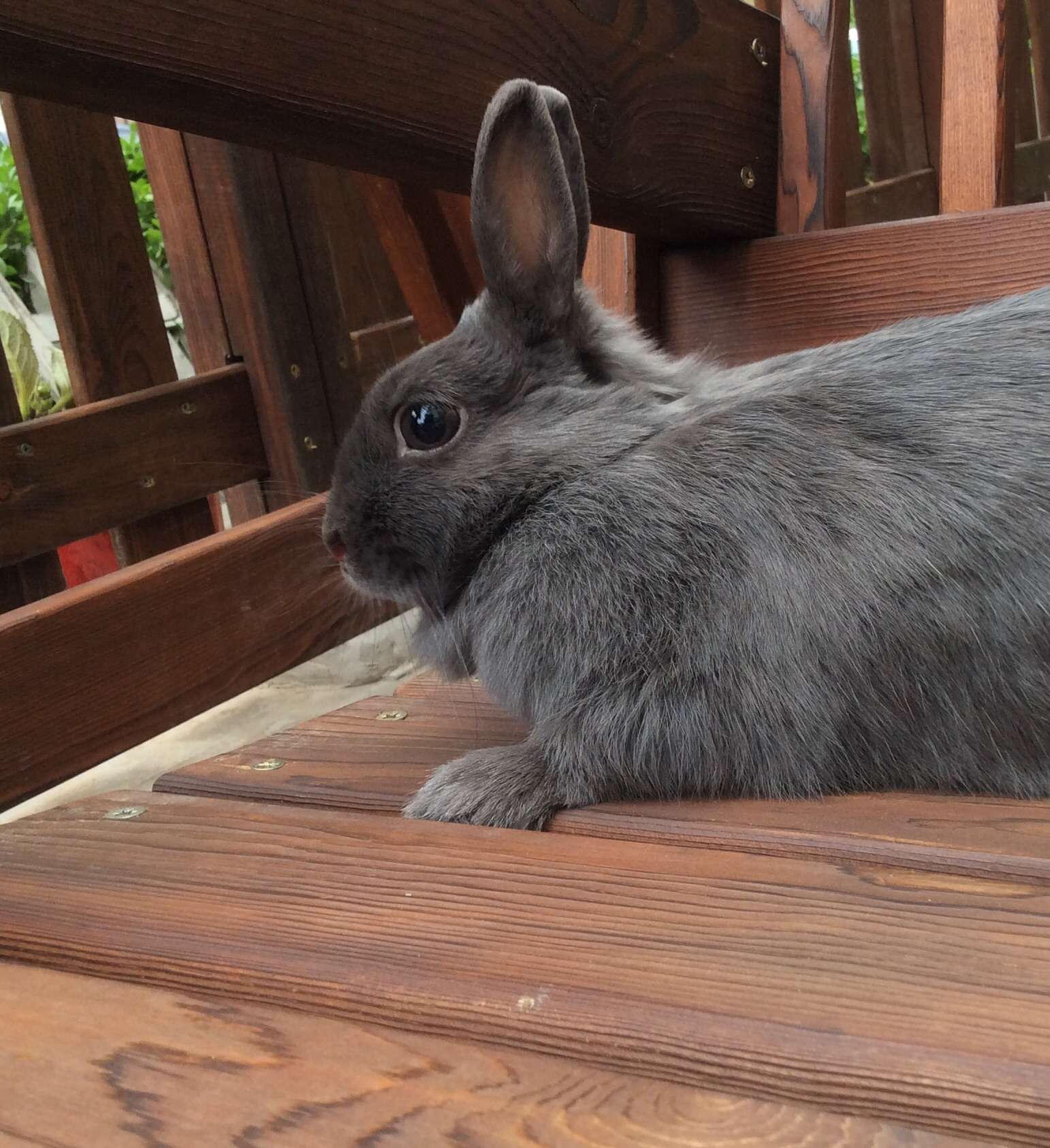
A Netherland Dwarf rabbit on swing

== Diet ==
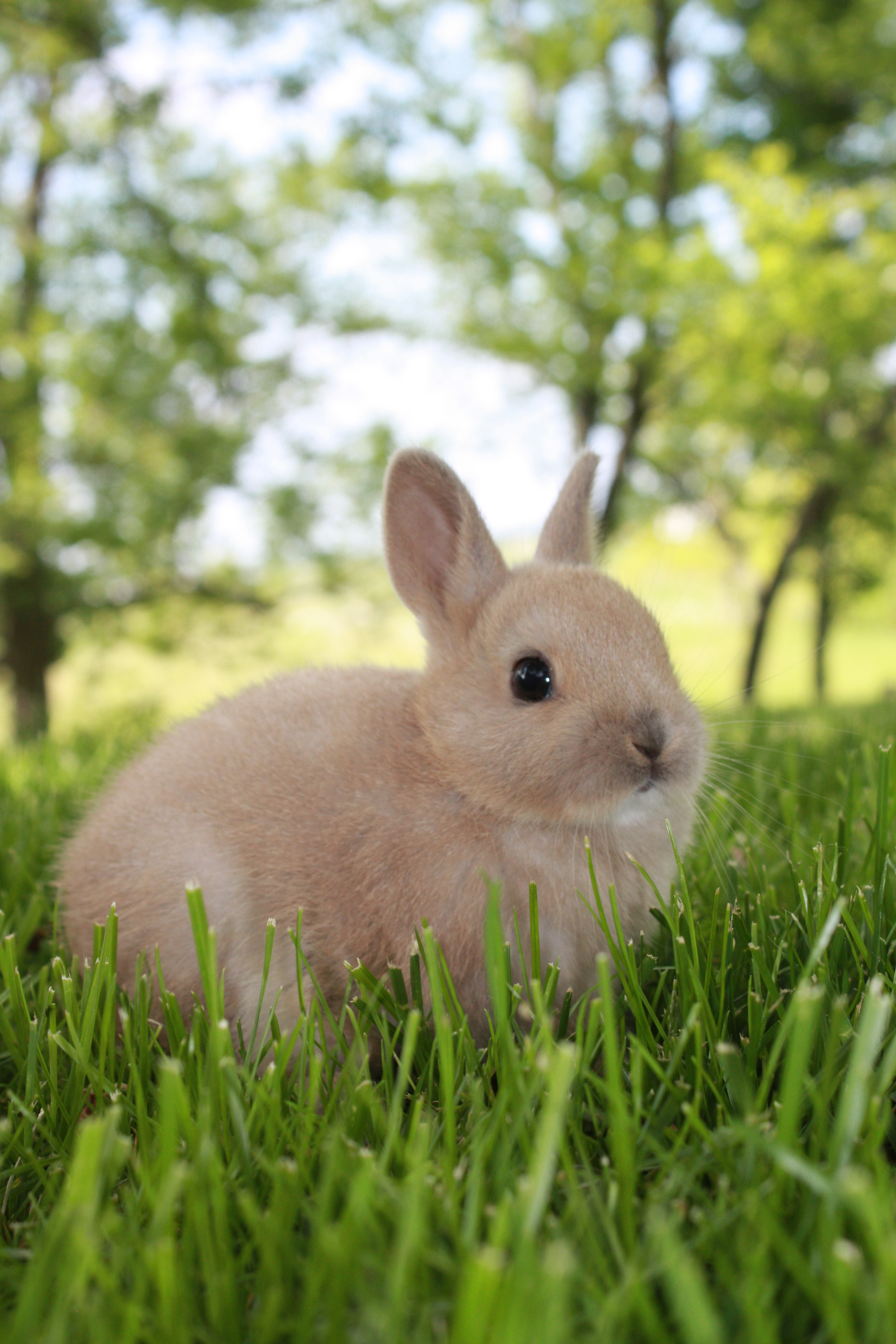
A 4-week-old Netherlands Dwarf rabbit.

The diet of a Netherlands Dwarf consists of an unlimited supply of hay, vegetables and good quality pellets. Root vegetables and fruit, which are high in sugar, are not considered suitable for forming a major part of the rabbit's diet, and should be given sparingly in small quantities.

Pellets should be fed in proportion to the adult rabbit's body weight, with 1/8 cup per pound of body weight recommended; juvenile rabbits, in contrast, are recommended to be fed an unlimited quantity of pellets. Vegetables, in particular dark, leafy greens, are also recommended in proportion to the rabbit's body weight, at 2 cups or more per 6 pounds of body weight. Alfalfa pellets are recommended for juvenile animals, with pellets gradually replaced with other hays and pellets as the rabbit ages, and food curtailed in proportion to the rabbit's weight.

== Dwarf breeds ==
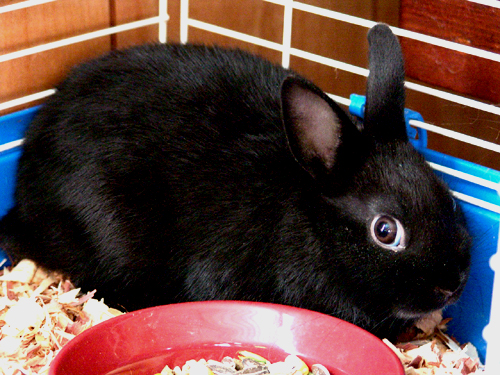
An adult female Netherland Dwarf, Black Self.

Rabbit breeds derived from breeding larger rabbits with the Netherland Dwarf (or any rabbit with a dwarf gene) are known as dwarf breeds. Most smaller breeds, like the Mini Rex, the Jersey Wooly, and the Holland Lop, are results of such breedings. Generally dwarf breeds are slightly larger than the typical Netherland Dwarf, not growing larger than 4–5 lb (1.8–2.3 kg). Most have shortened faces compared to larger rabbits, and some even preserve the rounded head, large eyes or small ears of the Netherland Dwarf. These features make them look little. Specifically, the Netherland Dwarf body should be round, compact and equally broad from front to back.

Dwarf rabbits also have short legs and a large head in relation to the body. Their foreheads are broad and they have well-developed muzzles. Furthermore, the eyes are large and prominent. Their ears are erect and close together, reaching between one and three inches in length. They have to be shorter than 2.5 in (64 mm) per ARBA rules; if not, this is a disqualification from competition in the Netherland Dwarf breed. Dwarf rabbits typically weigh 2–2.5 lb (0.91–1.13 kg) according to ARBA.

== Breeding ==
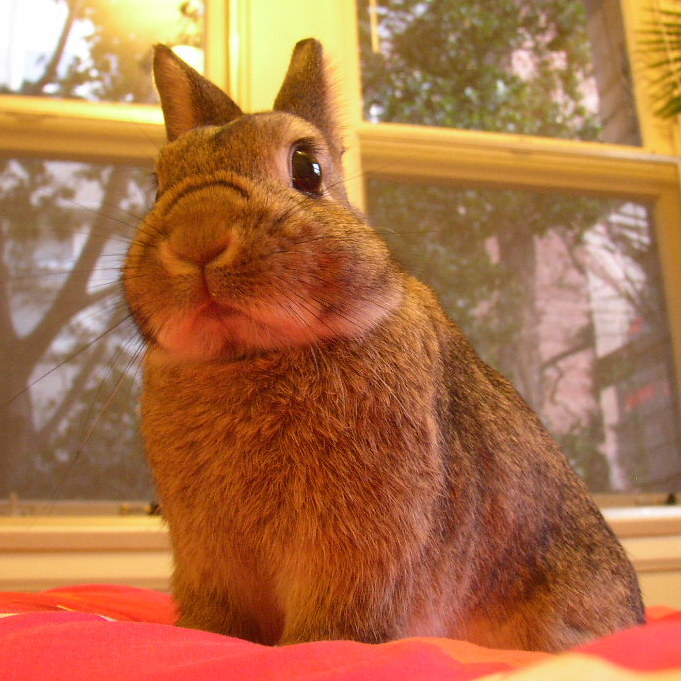
A one-year-old Chestnut (Agouti) Netherland Dwarf

The dwarf gene (symbol Dw) was discovered in the United States during the beginning of the 20th century. When two "true dwarfs" (both buck and doe) are bred, the genetic pattern which makes them "true dwarfs" (Dwdw) ensures that 25 percentage of their offspring will inherit the lethal genetic combination dwdw. These offspring, often called "peanuts" by rabbit breeders, fail to thrive and most die within 1–3 days of birth. The reasons behind the lethal nature of the dwdw combination is unknown, but it is believed to cause underdeveloped digestive tracts in rabbits. The condition is 100% fatal, although if fed by hand every hour and kept warm, it is possible for a peanut to survive for up to three weeks, even though it will be handicapped for its entire short life. Many ethical breeders humanely euthanise peanuts upon finding them soon after birth. Peanuts are easily distinguished from non-peanuts; they have extremely pinched hindquarters, a bulbous head and their ears are often set further back than normal (sometimes almost onto the neck).

If two true dwarfs are bred, the statistical result will be 25% fatal 25% false, and 50% true. The actual numbers of true/false/peanuts in a real litter varies. "False Dwarfs" tend to have longer bodies, longer/larger ears, longer faces, and are mostly heavier than the 2.5 lb (1.1 kg) maximum weight for showing. While false dwarfs (referred to as BUDs by breeders, meaning "big ugly doe") do not make good show rabbits, does from a good background are vital to a breeder's programme. They have the same "good genes" as a true dwarf and are capable mothers, possibly even having larger and more successful litters than true dwarfs. False Dwarfs are also unable to produce peanuts. Their litters will be 50% false dwarfs and 50% true dwarfs if they are bred to a true dwarf buck. False dwarfs are easily judged for quality as the traits are generally the same, only bigger. Ear thickness/shape, fullness of hindquarter, topline and other traits are the same.

It is common practice among Netherland Dwarf breeders to breed a proven show quality true dwarf buck to a quality false dwarf doe. This eliminates the chance of peanuts and yields quality offspring. The chances of false dwarfs is higher, but those offspring generally go toward breeding (some false dwarf bucks have proven themselves valuable to a breeding programme) or are sold as pets. Usually false dwarf bucks are not kept by breeders.

== See also ==
- Dwarf rabbit
- List of rabbit breeds
