= Polish rabbit =

Breed of rabbit

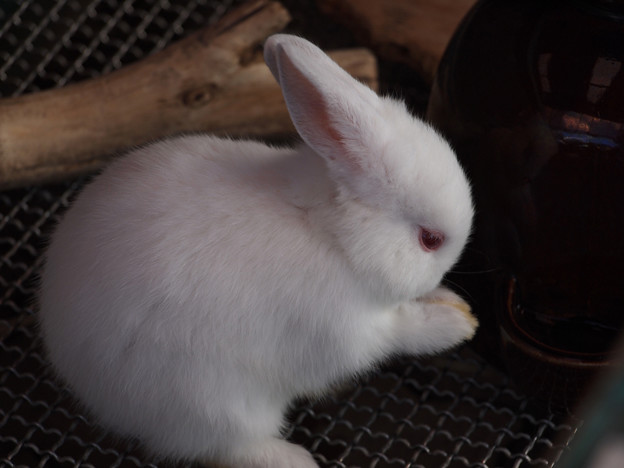
A Polish breed rabbit (The breed named Polish in the UK is named Britannia Petite in the USA.) Ruby eyed white color variety

The Polish rabbit is a compact breed of domestic rabbit, most often bred by fanciers (as opposed to hobbyists) and commonly exhibited in rabbit shows. Despite its name, the Polish rabbit likely originated in England, not Poland. The breed known in the UK as Polish is known in the US as Britannia Petite.; the breed known in the US as Polish is unknown in the UK.

== Appearance ==
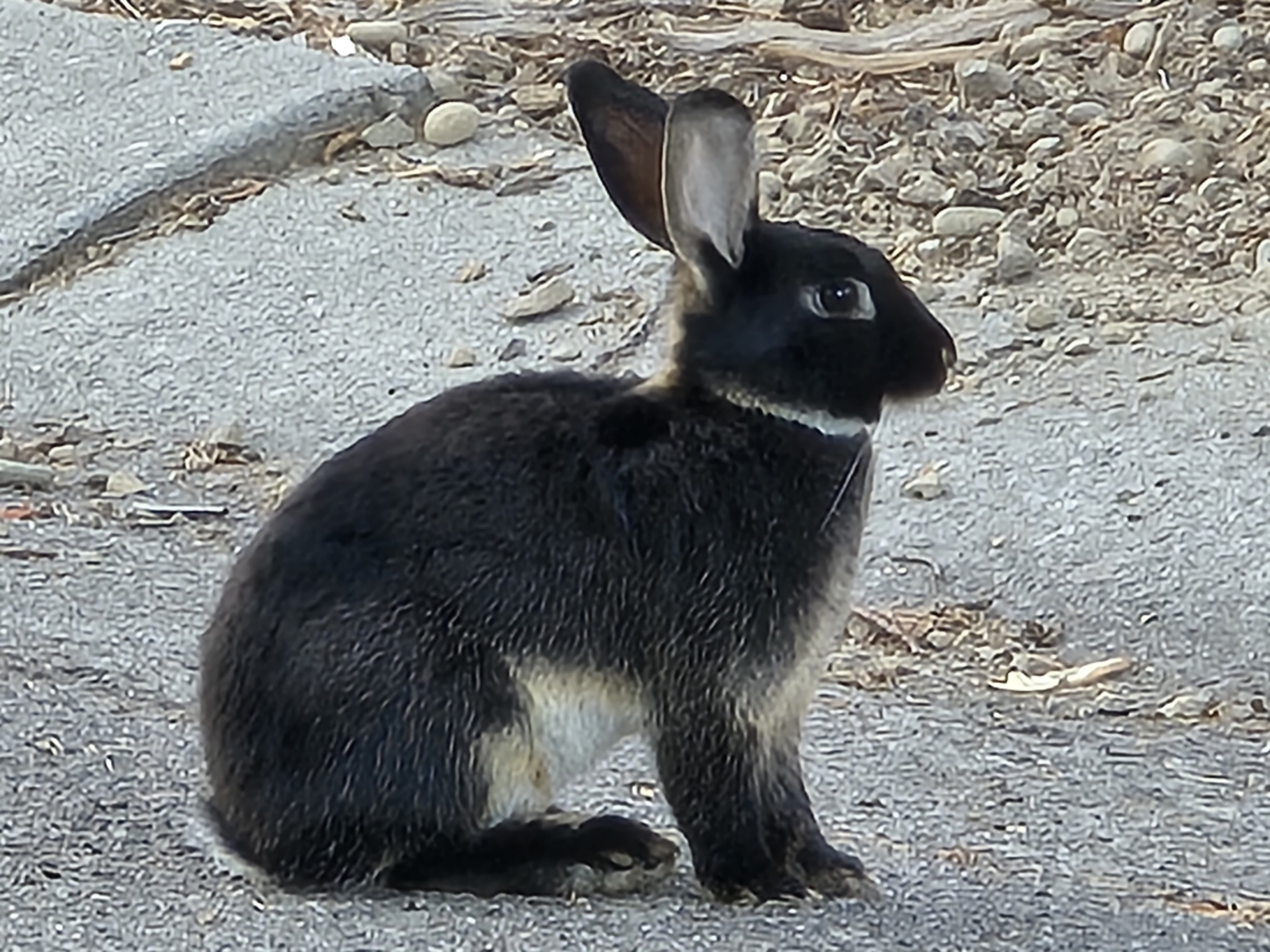
A Britannia Petite (a/k/a Polish) rabbit in the black color variety

Today, the Polish rabbit in the US is used as a fancy exhibition breed and as a pet. Polish rabbits are small, with short ears that touch each other all the way from the base to the tip. This breed has a short head with full cheeks and bold eyes. Due to its small size, the Polish rabbit is often confused with the Netherland Dwarf, although the Polish is a little larger and its head is not rounded. There are many other differences between the two breeds, such as coat structure, body type and colors. The accepted weight a 6-months-or-older Polish rabbit in the US is 2½ to 3½ pounds, with the ideal weight being 2½ pounds.

Until the 1950s, most Polish rabbits in the US were white with either red eyes or blue eyes. The ruby-eyed white is a true albino. The blue-eyed white has the Vienna breed's white gene and is not a true albino. Since the 1950s, colored Polish varieties have been recognized by rabbit clubs. In 1957, the American Rabbit Breeders' Association recognized a black as well as a chocolate color in Polish rabbits. In 1982, the blue variety was recognized, and in 1998 the broken variety was approved.

== Care ==
Despite their small size, Polish rabbits need space in cage and barn facilities. They are generally advised to keep indoors in areas populated by predators such as raccoons or coyotes, as is typical for dwarf rabbits.

=== Feeding ===
It is vital that rabbits have access to unlimited fresh hay to ensure good dental health, gastrointestinal health, urinary tract health, weight control and for environmental enrichment. The nutritional needs of the Polish rabbit are similar to those in other dwarf breeds.

The condition of the rabbit is tested by running one's hand over the rabbit’s back. A firm layer of flesh over the ribs and spine together with the ribs and spine should be felt, indicating proper nutrition. A prominent spine indicates undernutrition and is corrected by increasing the feed. The inability to feel the spine indicates overnutrition and likewise, the amount of feed is decreased.

=== Health concerns ===
As with other rabbits, Polish rabbits do not do well in high temperatures, but can withstand low temperatures if they are kept dry and out of drafts. They are prone to hairball obstructions and matted coats if not cared for properly. Other health concerns include ear mites, Pasturella, respiratory disease, dental problems, urinary bladder stones and fractured backs. The health issues associated with polish rabbits are similar to those in related dwarf breeds.

The average life span of a Polish rabbit is 5 to 8 years, with an average of 6; longer lifespans have been reported in neutered and spayed rabbits. The spaying of female rabbits after 9 months of age can be difficult, but unspayed and unneutered rabbits are at much higher risk of reproductive cancers. Female rabbits are ideally spayed at 6 months of age or before.

== See also ==
- Rabbit
- Domestic rabbit
- List of rabbit breeds
