= Cunicularium =

Animal husbandry practice

A cunicularium is an establishment of animal husbandry dedicated to the raising of rabbits for meat and fur. This enterprise is known as cuniculture.

== Etymology ==
The term was coined in mediaeval Latin as cunicularium (plural cunicularia), from Classical Latin cunicularis "pertaining to the rabbit", itself from cuniculus, from which the English "cony" (the European rabbit Oryctolagus cuniculus) derives. The Latin is taken from the Greek κύνικλος kúniklos (kýniklos) (compare modern Greek κουνέλι kouneli). The earliest known use of this word is in Polybius:

ho de kuniklos porrôthen men horômenos einai dokei lagôs mikros, hotan d' eis tas cheiras labêi tis, megalên echei diaphoran kai kata tên epiphaneian kai kata tên brôsin: The rabbit indeed at a distance looks like a small hare; but when taken in the hand, it is found to be widely different both in appearance and in the taste of its flesh; and it also lives generally underground.

An etymology has been proposed for the Greek word deriving it from a word meaning "burrow"; but it is more probable that evolution was to "(rabbit) hole" from "rabbit", rather than the reverse. It is most likely that the word is ultimately borrowed from the Iberian language.

== History ==
=== Ancient history ===
Polybius first described the cony at about the time that Ancient Greece fell under the sway of the Romans. However, the cony was introduced to the Romans from Iberia, as they quickly developed a taste for laurices after their conquest of Hispania. Rabbits are described by Pliny the Elder in his Naturalis Historia in the 1st century. The Romans are known to have raised rabbits in stone pens, probably to facilitate the harvesting of laurices. However, they seemingly did not use the term cunicularium; and the industry apparently collapsed as the Roman Empire fell.

=== Early Middle Ages ===
With the rise of monasticism several centuries later, a renewed interest in cunicularia arose, in part because they were productively and easily implemented within the monastic economic context. It was during this period that the cunicularium became established.

=== Late Middle Ages ===
Cunicularium was borrowed into Middle English as conygere, conyger, giving rise to numerous later variants such as conygarye, conyrie, and conygree.

== Difference between a warren and a cunicularium ==
Although the words have become nearly synonymous in modern English, the two institutions followed parallel, but separate paths in their development. The common, or domestic warren developed out of the free warren hunting franchise. This was because only by creating a close, or enclosed area for the freeholder's domestic stock of rabbits, could that person claim ownership of the rabbits in it. A domestic rabbit which escaped into a nearby free warren could not be claimed as property, even if the freeholder held title to the soil over which the warren extended, unless that individual also possessed the royal warrant of them, or unless it had escaped from a close. Such a close was called a "cony-garth". A rabbit escaped from the cony-garth was the property of the freeholder.

Note that in the following quote from a medieval law forbidding commoners the means to hunt, warrens are still distinct from connigries.

That divers artificers, labourers, servants, and grooms, keep greyhounds and other dogs, and on the holidays, when good Christian people be at church hearing devine service, they go hunting in parks, warrens, and connigries of lords and others, to the very great destruction of the same; and sometimes under such colour they make their assemblies, conferences, and conspiracies to rise, and disobey their allegiance.
