= Warren (burrow) =

Network of rabbit burrows

A warren is a network of interconnected burrows dug by rabbits. Domestic warrens are artificial, enclosed establishments of animal husbandry dedicated to the raising of rabbits for meat and fur. The term "warren" evolved from the medieval Anglo-Norman concept of free warren—essentially, the equivalent of a hunting license for small game in a given area of woodland.

== Architecture of the domestic warren ==
The cunicularia of the monasteries may have more closely resembled hutches or pens, than the open enclosures with specialized structures which the domestic warren eventually became. Such an enclosure or close was called a cony-garth, or sometimes conegar, coneygree or "bury" (from "burrow").

=== Moat and pale ===
To keep the rabbits from escaping, domestic warrens were usually provided with a fairly substantive moat, or ditch filled with water. Rabbits generally do not swim and avoid water. A pale, or fence, was provided to exclude predators.

=== Pillow mounds ===
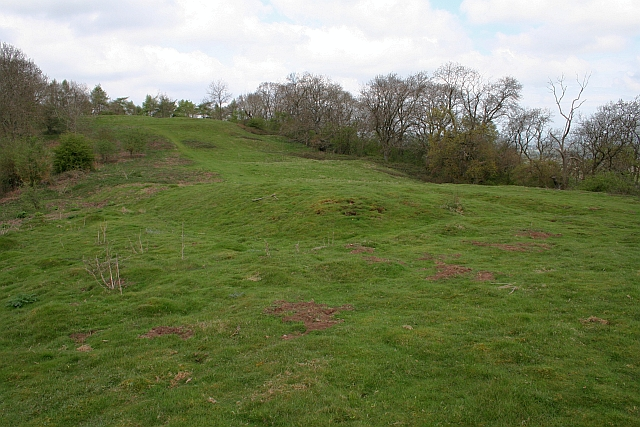
A modern view of a medieval pillow mound at Stoke Poges, England

The most characteristic structure of the "cony-garth" ("rabbit-yard") is the pillow mound. These were "pillow-like", oblong mounds with flat tops, frequently described as being "cigar-shaped", and sometimes arranged like the letter ⟨E⟩ or into more extensive, interconnected rows. Often these were provided with pre-built, stone-lined tunnels. The preferred orientation was on a gentle slope, with the arms extending downhill, to facilitate drainage. The soil needed to be soft, to accommodate further burrowing.

This type of architecture and animal husbandry has become obsolete, but numerous pillow mounds are still to be found in Britain, some of them maintained by English Heritage, with the greatest density being found on Dartmoor.

== Further evolution of the term ==
Ultimately, the term "warren" was generalized to include wild burrows. According to the 1911 Encyclopædia Britannica:

The word thus became used of a piece of ground preserved for these beasts of warren. It is now applied loosely to any piece of ground, whether preserved or not, where rabbits breed.

The use is further extended to any system of burrows, e.g., "prairie dog warren". By 1649, the term was applied to inferior, crowded human accommodations and meant "cluster of densely populated living spaces" (OED). Contemporarily, the leading use seems to be in the stock phrase "warren of cubicles" in the workplace.
