= Free warren =

Type of franchise or privilege conveyed by a sovereign in medieval England

A free warren—often simply warren—is a type of franchise or privilege conveyed by a sovereign in medieval England to an English subject, promising to hold them harmless for killing game of certain species within a stipulated area, usually a wood or small forest. The sovereign involved might be either the monarch or a marcher lord.

== Law ==
The grant of free warren could be as a gift, or in exchange for consideration, and might be later alienated by the grantee. The stipulated area might be coextensive with the frank-tenement of the grantee, or it might be discontinuous or even at a considerable remove from the grantee's holdings. The right of free warren did not extend automatically to the freeholder of the soil.

Although the rights of free warren are usually discussed in the context of forest law, the only law which applied within the warren was common law. Thus, even though the warrant ultimately derived from the sovereign, the only statutes applied to poachers in a warren were the common-law crimes of theft and trespass.

The privilege of free warren was a reciprocal relationship. The grantee of the warren was granted an exemption from the law (under which all game in the realm was property of the sovereign), but the grantee owed the sovereign the stewardship and protection of the game from all others who might wish to hunt it.

== Etymology ==
Modern English warren ← ME warrene, warreine ← ONF warrenne ← Germanic present participle of *warian "to take care; to cause to care (for)" ← causative of *waran "to care" ← *war "care". Doublet of guarantor. Related to OHG werien (i.e. *wärian) "to defend, protect", and also to English "a-ware, wary".

== Free warren and domestic warren ==
The original use of free warren was as a legal term. However, as the franchise defined both a set of species and a geographic extent, the natural semantic extensions arose, namely for the individual animals as a group, or for the land they inhabited. As it became pragmatically necessary for freeholders not holding a free warren to enclose their breeding establishments, these "closed warrens" or domestic warrens began also to be designated simply as "warrens" (use recorded in 1378; OED). In 1649 the metaphoric use as "cluster of densely populated living spaces" is recorded.

== Warren and warden ==
The Mediaeval Latin form of the word warenna was used in legal documents such as Magna Carta. In addition, the office of warden is used for the overseer of a warren:

(V.) But the warden, as long as he hath the custody of the lands, shall keep up and maintain the houses, parks, warrens, ponds, mills, and other things belonging to them, out of their issues;

The warden of a Royal forest was often the castellan or constable of the nearest royal castle; over time the less exalted title of warrener evolved for the custodian of the lowest of the hunting franchises, the warren.

== Warren and warrant ==
The adjective free in free warren does not refer to the lack of enclosure surrounding the precincts of the warren, but rather to the fact the "liberty" of hunting derives from a warrant of the sovereign. That is,

The term "warrant" occurs very early in constitutional documents: it is found in the Assize of Clarendon and the Assize of the Forest, both in the reign of Henry II., but in neither case in its modern meaning. The original meaning seems to have been more akin to guarantee (q.v.), warranty or security; and to some extent the term implies something in the nature of a guarantee or representation by the person issuing the warrant that the person who acts on it can do so without incurring any legal penalty.

All of the terms warrant, warrantor, and warranty are used in Henry II of England's Assize of the Forest (a.k.a. Assize of Woodstock) in 1184:

Article 2. Item, he has commanded that no one shall have bows, arrows, dogs, or hounds in his forests, unless [such person] has the warrant of the king or of some other man who can [lawfully] be his warrantor.

Article 9. Item, the king forbids all clergymen to commit any offences touching his venison or his forests. He strictly orders his foresters that, if they find such men committing offences, they shall not hesitate to lay hands on those men in order to hold them and put them under attachment; he himself will give full warranty.

== Beasts of warren ==
The permission to take game was limited to certain types of animals. Generally, the killing of vermin (defined as predators and other beasts not fit for the table) was not regulated. This definition was flexible, however, depending on whether the animal was thought to provide good sport, as wolves, foxes, badgers, or bears. In practice, vermin could only be killed on the commons or waste, since none but the grantee was permitted to have instruments of the hunt within the warren.

=== Manwood ===
The most cited authority on forest law, John Manwood, cites these beasts of warren:

"The beasts and fouls of Warren are these, The Hare, the Cony, the Pheasant, and the Partridge, and none other are accompted beasts or fouls of Warren."

However, Manwood is mistaken in his assignments, since the roe deer was transferred to "beast of warren" from "beast of the forest" in the fourteenth century. Roe deer are still found within woodlands named "Warren" in contemporary England. The 1911 Encyclopedia adds roe, woodcock, quail, rail and heron to Manwood's list. On the other hand, grouse are not birds of warren. Fox, wolf, cat, badger, and squirrel are sometimes also added.

Sometimes domestic swine are mistakenly thought to be beasts of warren, due the right of pannage.

== Bibliography ==
- ARTFL Project: Webster Dictionary, 1913, p *Blackstone, xxx. 9999. Commentaries on the Laws of England [http://www.yale.edu/lawweb/avalon/blackstone/bk2ch27.htm Online Version
- Manwood, John. 1598. A Treatise and Discourse of the Lawes of the Forrest Online Version
- Forests and Chases in England and Wales, c. 1500 to c. 1850 A Glossary of Terms and Definitions
- Craies, William Feilden (1911a). "Game Laws" . In Chisholm, Hugh (ed.). Encyclopædia Britannica. Vol. 11 (11th ed.). Cambridge University Press. pp. 440–441.
- Craies, William Feilden (1911b). "Warrant" . In Chisholm, Hugh (ed.). Encyclopædia Britannica. Vol. 28 (11th ed.). Cambridge University Press. pp. 327–327.
- Chisholm, Hugh, ed. (1911). "Forest Laws" . Encyclopædia Britannica. Vol. 10 (11th ed.). Cambridge University Press. pp. 644–645.
- Stubbs, William. 1900 Select Charters and Other Illustrations of English Constitutional History, p. 74. Oxford: The Clarendon Press.
- Magna Carta: A Commentary on the Great Charter of King John, with and Historical Introduction, by William Sharp McKechnie (Glasgow: Maclehose, 1914).
