= Laurices =

Rabbit fetus eaten as a meat dish

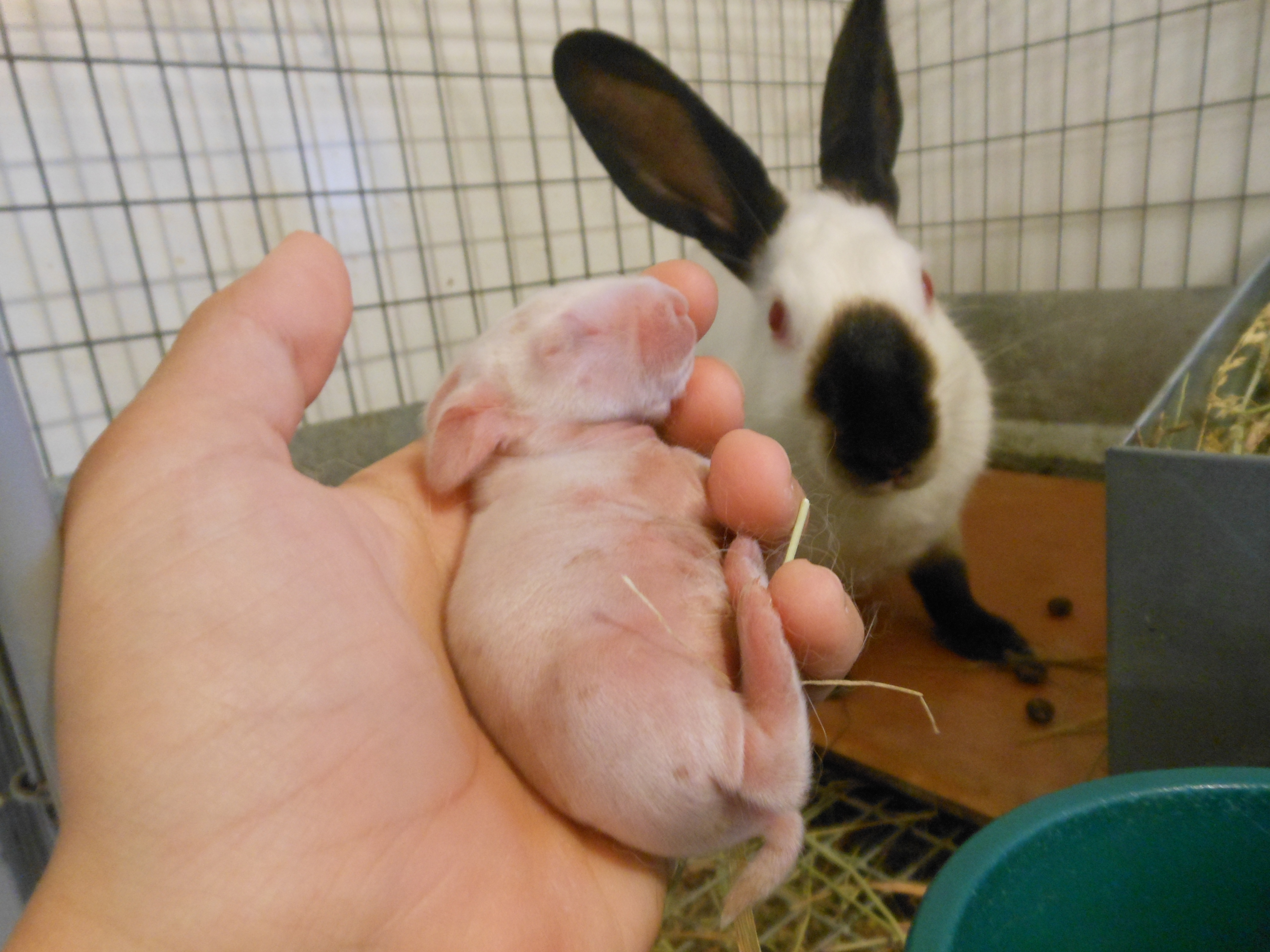
Newborn rabbits may be prepared as laurices.

Laurices are rabbit fetuses prepared without evisceration and consumed as a table delicacy. The word is the plural of the Latin word laurex (variant laurix, n. masc., pl. laurices; English singular occasionally laurice), assumed to have been borrowed from an Iberian source. The word is normally found in the plural number, since, due to their size, more than one would be served at a time. The rabbit was adopted by the Romans from Hispania, whence it spread over western Europe, as did likewise the custom of consuming laurices.

As the domestication of rabbits became established, the source of laurices was extended to newborns, because it became possible to harvest them without sacrificing the breeding doe, the time of birth being able to be monitored.

== Earliest historical mention ==
The first known mention of this gastronomic speciality is with Pliny the Elder (23—79) in his Naturalis Historia :

Leporum generis sunt et quos hispania cuniculos appellat, fecunditatis innumerae famemque baliarum insulis populatis messibus adferentis. - (fetus ventri exectos vel uberibus ablatos, non repurgatis interaneis, gratissimo in cibatu habent; laurices vocant).... There is also a species of hare, in Spain, which is called the rabbit; it is extremely prolific, and produces famine in the Balearic Islands, by destroying the harvests. The young ones, either when cut from out of the body of the mother, or taken from the breast, without having the entrails removed, are considered a most delicate food; they are then called laurices.

== Gregory of Tours ==
The consumption of laurices (called fetus cunicolorum) during the fast of Lent is mentioned by Gregory of Tours (ca. 538—594) in his Historia Francorum ("History of the Franks"), Book 5.4.

Next Roccolen marched on Tours Chilperic ... On his way back to his camp from the cathedral he was so ill that he could take no food that day. As a result his strength drained away. He set out for Poitiers. We were then in the holy month of Lent: and he kept on eating baby rabbits. He had earlier drawn up for the first day of March certain ordinances by which he planned to mulct and ruin the people of Poitiers. Twenty-four hours before that he died; and with him died his overweening arrogance.

Earlier in the passage, Roccolen appears in conflict with Gregory of Tours himself, and Roccolen is described by Gregory as being an impious rascal. Therefore, Gregory's mention of this practice can best be interpreted as condemnation.

== Myth ==
The common theory that Pope Gregory I (540 – 604) authorized the consumption of laurices during Lent and other fasts, declaring them to be a marine species, like fish or shellfish, is false. The myth derives, in fact, from a misreading of Gregory of Tours' Historia Francorum 5.4 (quoted above) and a confusion between Gregory of Tours and Pope Gregory, two contemporary but different authors with the same name. Furthermore, this myth has also led to the idea that the rabbit was domesticated circa 600 AD, which must similarly be rejected.

== Bibliography ==
- [BOS] Pliny the Elder. Bostock, John, Henry Thomas Riley eds. The Natural History, 2nd Ed., 1855. Book VIII: "The Nature Of The Terrestrial Animals", Chapter 81(55): "The Different Species Of Hares." Online version at Perseus.
- [MAY] Pliny the Elder, Naturalis Historia (ed. Karl Friedrich Theodor Mayhoff.) Lipsiae [Leipzig]: Teubner. 1906. Online version at Perseus.
- [LEW Lewis, Charlton T. and Charles Short, A Latin Dictionary. Oxford: Clarendon Press, 1879. Online version at Perseus.
- [ZEU] Zeuner, Frederick Everard. A History of Domesticated Animals. New York: Harper & Row. 1963.

== See also ==
- Balut (food) – Bird embryo eaten from egg shell
- Cuniculture – Agricultural raising and breeding of rabbits
- Kutti pi – Anglo-Indian dish made of goat fetus
