= Hapunan =

2024 survival horror video game

- Developer: Yikon Dev
- Publisher: Yikon Dev
- Director: Josef Yenko
- Writer: Josef Yenko
- Engine: Unity
- Platforms: Microsoft Windows, Android
- Release: December 2024
- Genre: Survival horror
- Mode: Single-player

Hapunan (lit.: "Dinner" or "Supper") is a Philippine-made first-person survival horror video game developed by Filipino indie developer Yikon Dev. The game was created using the Unity game engine. The plot focuses on Niko, a Filipino student who sells balut in his home barangay during the night, the time when a group of contract killers commit murders. The game became popular on social media platforms after its release in December 2024.

An extended and re-imagined version, titled Prologue, was released in 2026.

== Gameplay ==
Hapunan is a single-player psychological horror game played from the silent protagonist's first-person perspective. The total gameplay duration is approximately 30 to 40 minutes. The player controls a character named Niko. The player must perform tasks related to selling food, such as balut and chicharon. The game begins with a "job simulator" style before transitioning into horror elements. Players explore a dark environment and encounter various voiced non-player characters (NPCs). The game includes jump scares, including a specific character named "Madona".

== Summary ==
=== Original ===
In Barangay Sakdudol live a tricycle driver named Alvin, his wife Che, and their two sons-Niko and Nixon. The impoverished family of four live in a single-floor house made of light materials and can only afford to eat tuyo with rice. Despite studying full time, Niko sells balut and chicharon in the streets of the main barangay every night while his father works during the day.

The main barangay itself can only be accessed via a single gate serving as both entrance and exit; to work, Niko and his father must follow a railway track from their house and enter the gate.

Night 1

One night in November 2023, Che wakes Niko up to sell balut; Nixon is ill but getting better. While Niko and his mother are eating dinner and listening to the news on the family's radio, a broadcaster urges his listeners to be vigilant due to the return of the "Pay-to-Kill", a notorious gang of hired killers who attack during the night. Che explains that when she and Alvin were young, many inhabitants of Sakdudol were murdered by the Pay-to-Kill, with most of the perpetrators being paupers bribed by corrupt politicians into committing the crimes; the group originally dissolved when the police arrested its leader. Alvin soon comes home with a rotisserie chicken he has bought with his earnings and tells Niko to be safe. Saving the chicken for breakfast the following morning, Che commands Niko to sell his basket of balut and to come home as soon as he is done.

As his family sleeps for the night, Niko secures their house and briefly converses with their next door neighbor, Ashley, the two wishing each other a safe evening. While walking to the main barangay, Niko is surprised to see a lit cabin; he inspects it and finds nothing but a locked trapdoor. Remembering the broadcaster's warning, Niko continues on his way.

Niko eventually arrives in the main barangay and sells his products. Some of the customers are surprised to see Niko and ask him if he has a business permit needed to sell balut. Madona, a homeless resident of Sakdudol, appears to Niko, warning him not to come back as he freely gives her the last balut he has. Finding the gate locked, Niko meets the gatekeeper, Mang Berto, who orders him to ask for permission next time.

Confused and annoyed by the warnings, Niko goes home and sleeps.

Night 2

The following night, Niko is woken up by Nixon who has fully recovered. Instead of selling balut, Niko's mother tells him to go obtain his business permit before the barangay hall closes.

At the barangay hall, the captain gives Niko his business permit; when Niko complains of his customers' reactions, the barangay captain reveals that it is due to all the other vendors in Sakdudol being murdered by the Pay-to-Kill. The barangay captain even pays Niko ₱500.00 in exchange for the young man bringing packages into the hall, a job assigned to a tardy worker whom the captain angrily fires.

As Niko is about to go home, he is surprised to see Ashley, who says she wants to discuss something with the barangay captain.

Night 3

On the third night, Niko is about to head out with his latest batch of balut when he and his family hear on the radio that more people in Sakdudol have been killed. Fearing for their lives and their sons', Alvin and Che decide for the whole family to leave the barangay the next day; Alvin commands Niko to earn enough for the move.

On his way to the main barangay, Niko is shocked to see a figure entering the cabin but finds no one inside. When Niko sits in his usual spot, chaos erupts when the Pay-to-Kill appears. Chased by the killers, Niko enters the cabin's trapdoor.

Following an underground passageway, Niko finds his father who has conducted a list of suspects. But father and son are cornered by the barangay captain and Ashley, both in cahoots with the killers who are revealed to be corrupt police officers. Before the Pay-to-Kill could silence Niko and Alvin, the two are rescued by Mang Berto who shoots several of the killers dead, including Ashley and the captain; however, Mang Berto himself gets shot by an assassin whom Alvin shoots dead. Despite his injuries, Mang Berto orders Niko and Alvin to save their family before the killers get to them. Thanking Mang Berto, Niko and Alvin race home and have Nixon and Che hide in the dining room.

Hiding themselves behind the door, Niko and Alvin successfully shoot the rest of the would-be murderers dead.

Epilogue

Come December, Niko, his family, and Mang Berto are still living in Sakdudol, and all the remaining Pay-to-Kill members have been arrested because of the list provided by Alvin.

== Development ==
Hapunan was developed by Josef Nikolaus Yenko, also known by the alias "Yikon". Yenko was 21 years old at the time of the game's success. He began learning programming in 2016. The game was created using the Unity engine. Yenko developed the game on a low-specification laptop, which he referred to as a "potato PC". Due to hardware limitations, the Unity engine crashed frequently during development. Yenko created the 3D models directly within Unity instead of using external software like Blender.

The concept for the game originated during a bike ride with Yenko's father. His father suggested making the player a balut vendor to reflect Filipino culture. Yenko included details specific to Filipino households, such as plywood walls, tuyo (dried fish), and plastic water dispensers. He stated that he wanted to create a horror experience based on real-life fears rather than fictional locations like asylums.

== Release and reception ==
The game was released in December 2024. It is available on Itch.io for Windows and Android platforms. The developer warned users against unauthorized versions found on the Google Play Store or App Store. As of February 2025, the game had been downloaded over 200,000 times on Itch.io.

Hapunan received attention from internet content creators. American streamer CaseOh played the game, and his video received nearly three million views in three weeks. Other streamers, such as Kubz Scouts and Kristian PH, also posted gameplay videos that gained millions of views.

Critics noted the game's cultural accuracy. Esquire Philippines praised the game for its grounded realism and relatable protagonist. Spin.ph noted that while the graphics were "indie-esque", the character designs added to the creepiness. The graphics are comparable to the "low-poly photorealism of an N64 game", a positive Rock Paper Shotgun review writes. YugaTech described the game's twist regarding police corruption as a "clever subversion" of horror tropes.

The original version of Hapunan is the edition available for sale on Itch.io for $3.99, but new players can purchase it along with the Prologue for $7.99.
