= Kutti pi =

Anglo-Indian dish made of goat fetus

- Type: Curry
- Place of origin: India
- Main ingredients: Animal fetus

Kutti pi (pronounced 'cootie-pie') is a dish from Anglo-Indian cuisine, consisting of the flesh of an unborn fetus from an animal, usually goat. It is unique to the Anglo-Indian community, where it is considered a delicacy despite being abhorred as taboo by both parent cultures.

The flesh of a fetus is not regular table-fare in any culture, except balut, a common food in countries in Southeast Asia, which is a developing bird embryo (usually a duck or chicken) that is boiled and eaten from the shell. The non-Anglo-Indian butchers' markets make efficient use of all other portions of the animals, but since the fetus is considered taboo by most Indians, even when goat fetus is available, those who seek it may not be able to buy it without difficulty.
