= Cloven hoof =

Hoof split into two toes

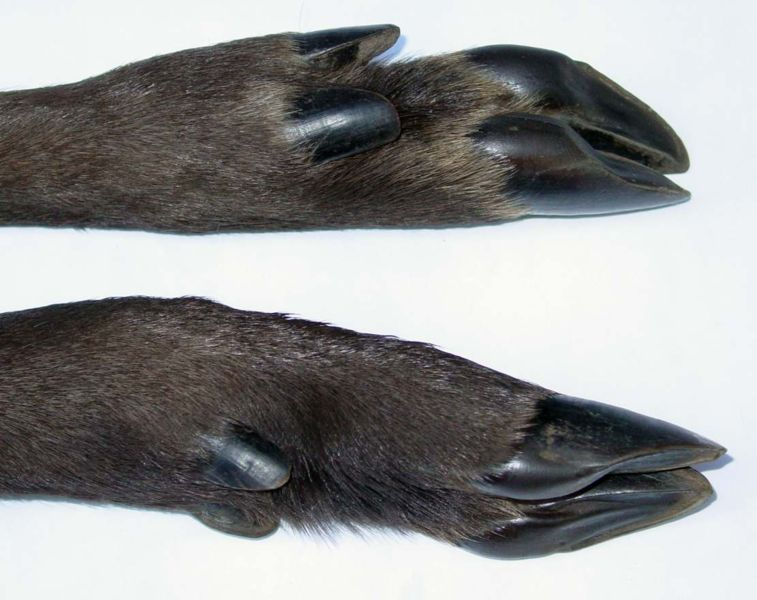
Cloven hooves of roe deer (Capreolus capreolus)

A cloven hoof, cleft hoof, divided hoof, or split hoof is a hoof split into two toes. Members of the mammalian order Artiodactyla that possess this type of hoof include pigs (suborder Suina), as well as cattle, deer, antelopes, gazelles, goats, and sheep (suborder Ruminantia).

The two digits of cloven-hooved animals are homologous to the third and fourth fingers of the hand. They are called claws and are named for their relative location on the foot: the outer, or lateral, claw and the inner, or medial claw. The space between the two claws is called the interdigital cleft; the area of skin is called the interdigital skin. The hard outer covering of the hoof is called the hoof wall or horn. It is a hard surface, similar to the human fingernail.

The almost finger-like dexterity available to cloven-hooved mammals such as mountain goats and wild sheep combined with a hard outer shell and soft and flexible inner pads provides grip for better traction in their sometimes rocky habitats.

== Evolution ==
It is speculated by paleontologists that during the Eocene period hooved marsh dwellers carried their body weight mainly on two of the middle toes, which grew to equal size, becoming the Artiodactyla or even-toed hooved animals. Before the end of the Eocene period the side toes of some had dwindled and practically disappeared (mainly in the form of a dewclaw) while the basal pieces or metapodium of the pair of supporting toes became fused together, thus producing the appearance of a cloven hoof.

The mammal with a cloven hoof is an even-toed ungulate of order Artiodactyla as opposed to the odd-toed ungulates of Perissidactyla, such as the horse, which have one toe, or the rhinoceros, which has three toes. The five-toed ancestors of the earliest Eocene had already developed feet that suggest odd-toed and even-toed descendants to the modern viewer. Even Phenacodus, the most generalized of the early mammals, has a foot in which the central toe is somewhat larger than the others and could be placed in the division of odd-toed ungulates, Perissidactyla.

== Jewish dietary laws ==
The distinction between cloven and uncloven hooves is highly relevant for dietary laws of Judaism (kashrut), as set forth in the Torah and the Talmud. Animals that both chew their cud (ruminate, i.e. regurgitate partly digested food from a specialised multi-chambered stomach back to the mouth to be chewed for a second time as part of their ordinary digestive process) and have split true cloven hooves (a hoof being hard or rubbery sole and a hard wall formed by a thick nail) are allowed (kosher, lit. "fit") for Jewish consumption. Those animals that have neither of these two characteristics, or only one of the characteristics, are considered unclean animals (treif, not fit for Jewish consumption) and Jews are forbidden to eat them.

This rule thus excludes the camel from the list of kosher animals because although the camel does ruminate it does not possess true "hooves" – it walks on soft toes which have little more than a nail merely giving an appearance of a "hoof". Similarly the pig, although it has cloven true hooves, does not ruminate. Other animals such as horses, dogs and cats exhibit neither characteristic and are thus also forbidden for Jewish consumption.
