= Food and drink prohibitions =

Prohibitions of consumption related to foods and drinks

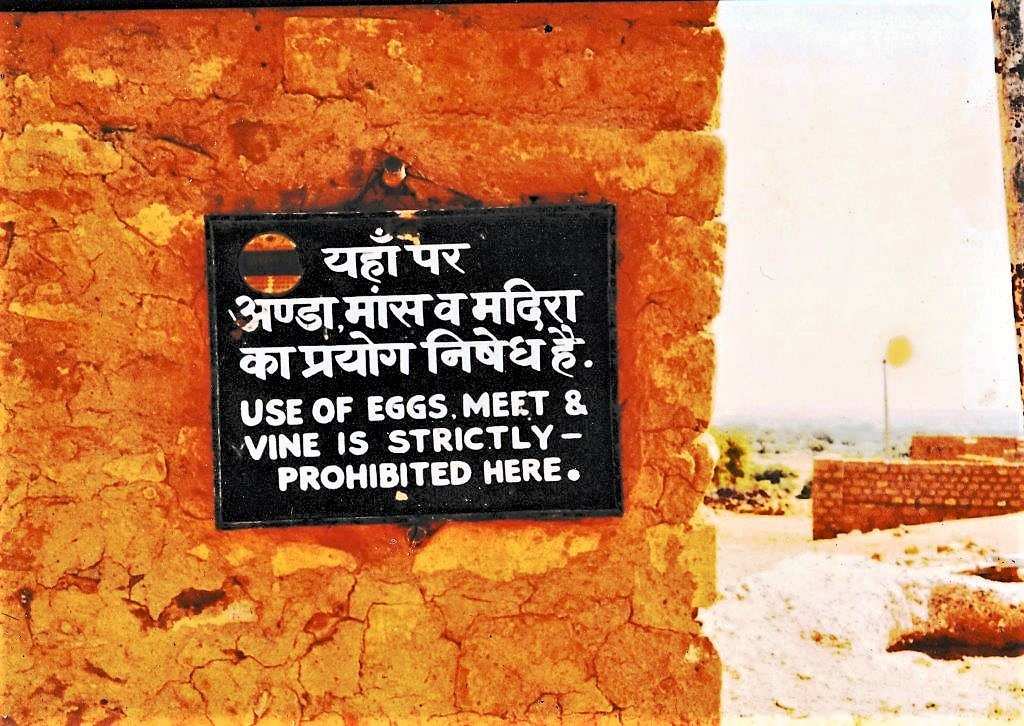
"Use of eggs, meet & vine [sic] is strictly-prohibited here." Jaisalmer, Rajasthan, India. 1993

Some people do not eat various specific foods and beverages in conformity with various religious, cultural, legal or other societal prohibitions. Many of these prohibitions constitute taboos. Many food taboos and other prohibitions forbid the meat of a particular animal, including mammals (such as rodents), reptiles, amphibians, fish, molluscs, crustaceans and insects, which may relate to a disgust response being more often associated with meats than plant-based foods. Some prohibitions are specific to a particular part or excretion of an animal, while others forgo the consumption of plants or fungi.

Some food prohibitions can be defined as a rule, codified by religion or otherwise, about which foods, or combinations of foods, may not be eaten and how animals are to be slaughtered or prepared. The origins of these prohibitions are varied. In some cases, they are thought to be a result of health considerations or other practical reasons; in others, they relate to human symbolic systems.

Some foods may be prohibited during weekdays, during certain religious periods (e.g., Lent), at certain stages of life (e.g., pregnancy), or to certain classes of people (e.g., priests), even if the food is otherwise permitted. On a comparative basis, what may be declared unfit for one group may be perfectly acceptable to another within the same culture or across different cultures. Food taboos usually seem to be intended to protect the human individual from harm, spiritually or physically, but there are numerous other reasons given within cultures for their existence. An ecological or medical background is apparent in many, including some that are seen as religious or spiritual in origin. Food taboos can help utilize a resource more effectively. However, when applied to only a subsection of a community, food taboos can lead to the monopolization of a food item by those exempted. A food taboo acknowledged by a particular group or tribe as part of their ways, aids in the cohesion of the group, helps that particular group to stand out and maintain its identity in the face of others and therefore creates a feeling of "belonging".

== Causes ==
Various religions forbid the consumption of certain types of food. For example, Judaism prescribes a set of rules, called kashrut, regarding what may and may not be eaten, and notably forbidding the mixing of meat with dairy products. Islam has similar laws, dividing foods into haram (forbidden) and halal (permitted). Jains often follow religious directives to observe vegetarianism. Some Hindus do not eat beef, and some Hindus, especially those from the upper castes, consider vegetarianism as ideal and practise forms of vegetarianism. In some cases, the process of preparation rather than the food itself comes under scrutiny. For instance, in early medieval Christianity, certain uncooked foods were of dubious status: a penitential ascribed to Bede outlined a mild penance for those who ate uncooked foods, and Saint Boniface wrote to Pope Zachary (in a letter preserved in the Boniface correspondence, no. 87) asking him how long bacon would have to be cured to be proper for consumption. The kapu system was used in Hawaii until 1819.

Aside from formal rules, there are cultural taboos against the consumption of some animals. Within a given society, some meats will be considered to be not for consumption that are outside the range of the generally accepted definition of a foodstuff. Novel meats, i.e. animal-derived food products not familiar to an individual or to a culture, generally provoke a disgust reaction, which may be expressed as a cultural taboo. For example, although dog meat is occasionally consumed by some people in East Asia, Indonesia, Switzerland and Nigeria, it is considered inappropriate as a food in many countries. Likewise, horse meat is rarely eaten in the English-speaking world, although it is part of the national cuisine of countries as widespread as Kazakhstan, Japan, Italy, and France.

Sometimes food prohibitions enter national or local law, as with the ban on cattle abattoirs in most of India, and horse slaughter in the United States. Even after reversion to Chinese rule, Hong Kong has not lifted its ban on supplying meat from dogs and cats, created during British rule.

Environmentalism, ethical consumerism and other activist movements are giving rise to new prohibitions and eating guidelines. A fairly recent addition to cultural food prohibitions is the meat and eggs of endangered species or animals that are otherwise protected by law or international treaty. Examples of such protected species include some species of whales, sea turtles, and migratory birds. Similarly, sustainable seafood advisory lists and certification discourage the consumption of certain seafoods due to unsustainable fishing. Organic certification prohibits certain synthetic chemical inputs during food production, or genetically modified organisms, irradiation, and the use of sewage sludge. The fair trade movement and certification discourage the consumption of food and other goods produced in exploitative working conditions. Other social movements generating taboos include local food and The 100-Mile Diet, both of which encourage abstinence from non-locally produced food, and veganism, in which adherents endeavour not to use or consume animal products of any kind.

== Prohibited foods ==
=== Amphibians ===
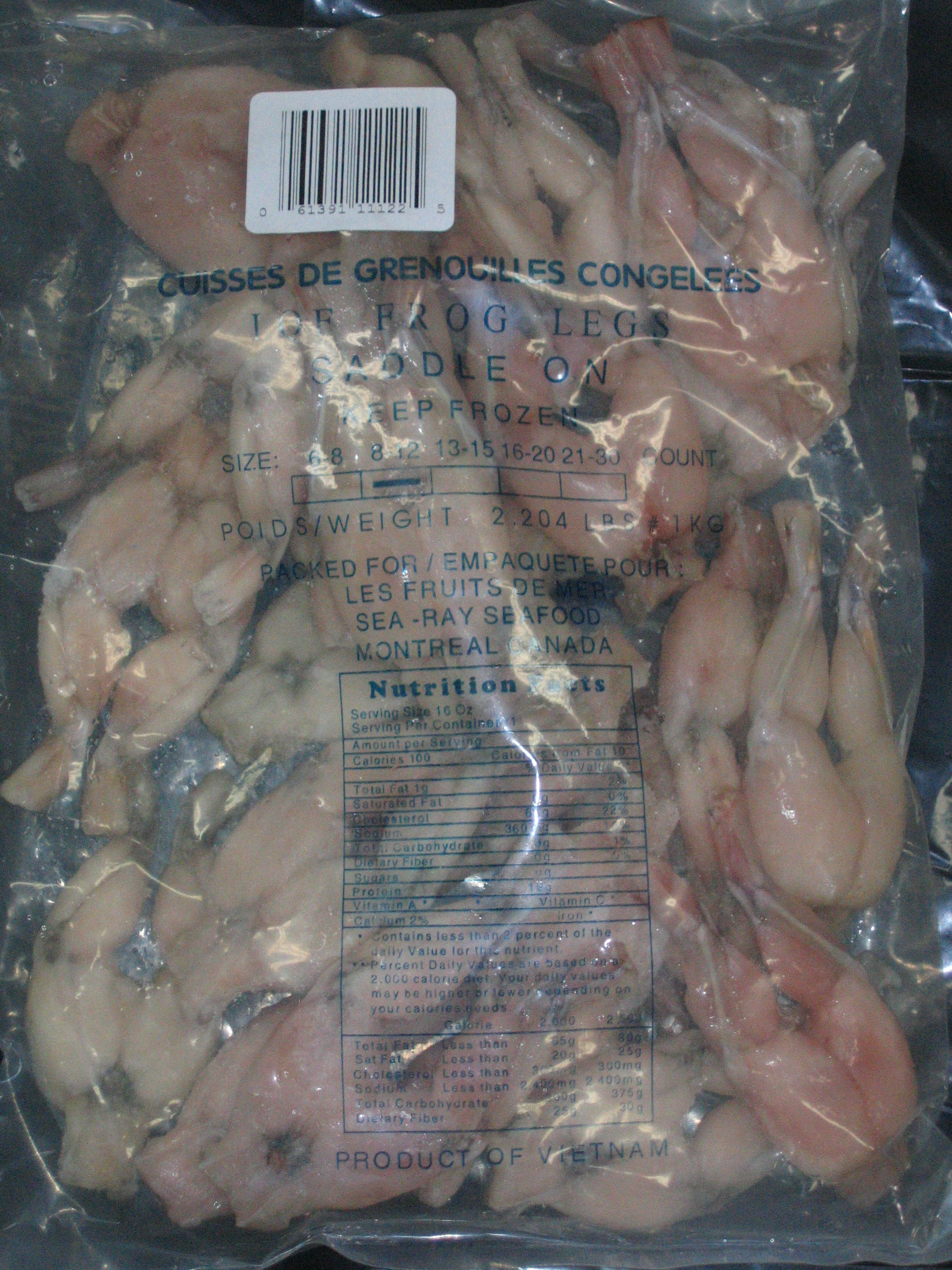
A bag of frog legs from Vietnam.

Judaism forbids the consumption of amphibians such as frogs. The restriction is described in Leviticus 11:29-30 and 42–43. Derivative chemical products from amphibians, as well as with other proscribed animals, must be avoided.

In other cultures, foods such as frog legs are treasured as delicacies, and the animals may be raised commercially in some circumstances. However, environmental concerns over the endangerment of frogs, even possibly pushing them into extinction, due to overconsumption has prompted legal action in nations such as France to limit their use in food. The French Ministry of Agriculture began taking measures to protect native frog species in 1976, and efforts have continued since. Mass commercial harvesting of the animals was banned in 1980, though international imports as well as private, individual hunting and cooking remain legal in many areas.

=== Bats ===
In Judaism, the Deuteronomic Code and Priestly Code explicitly prohibit the bat. Bat meat, like that of all predatory land animals, is haram (prohibited) in Islam.

=== Birds ===
The Torah (Leviticus 11:13) explicitly states that the eagle, vulture, and osprey are not to be eaten. A bird now commonly raised for meat in some areas, the ostrich, is explicitly banned as food in some interpretations of Leviticus 11:16. Rabbis have frequently inferred that traditions that explicitly prohibit birds of prey and natural scavengers create a distinction with other avian species; thus, eating chickens, ducks, geese, and turkeys is allowed.

In contrast, Islamic dietary rules permit the consumption of ostrich, while birds of prey (defined specifically as those who hunt with claws and talons) are forbidden, as in Judaism.

Scavengers and carrion-eaters such as vultures and crows are avoided as food in many cultures because they are perceived as carriers of disease and unclean, and associated with death. An exception is the rook, which was a recognised country dish, and which has, more recently, been served in a Scottish restaurant in London. In Western cultures today, most people regard songbirds as backyard wildlife rather than as food.

A balut is a developing bird embryo (usually a duck or chicken) that is boiled and eaten from the shell. Part of the Quran includes understanding and respecting the law that any animal products should not be eaten if the animal has not been slaughtered properly, making the animal or animal-product "maytah". Because balut is an egg containing a partly-developed embryo, Muslims believe this makes it "haram", or "forbidden".

The ortolan bunting developed as a more recent taboo food among French gourmets. The tiny birds were captured alive, force-fed, then drowned in Armagnac, "roasted whole and eaten that way, bones and all, while the diner draped his head with a linen napkin to preserve the precious aromas and, some believe, to hide from God."

=== Camels ===
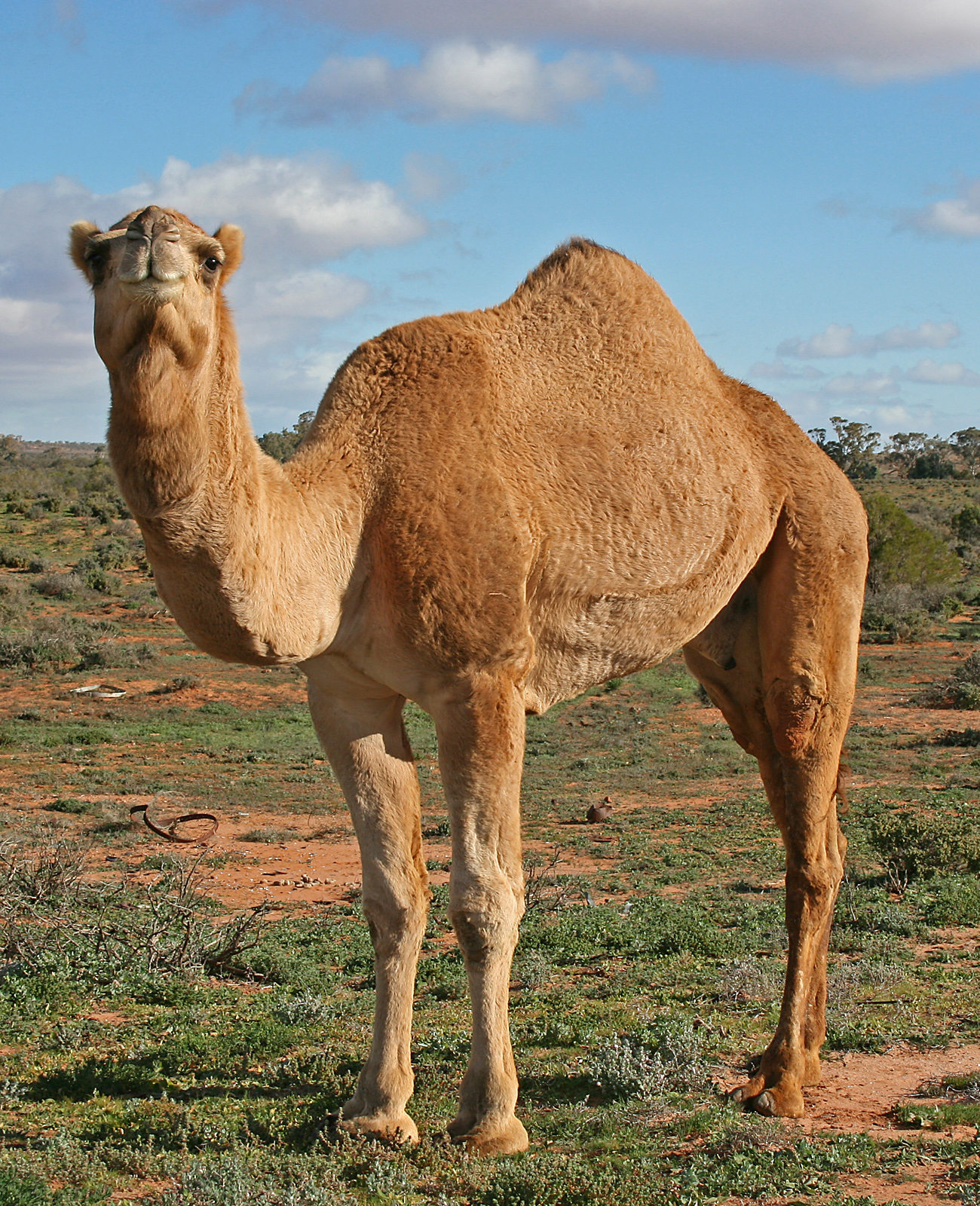
Dromedary camel

The eating of camels is prohibited by the Torah in Deuteronomy 14:7 and Leviticus 11:4. The Torah considers the camel unclean, even though it chews the cud, or regurgitates, the way bovines, sheep, goats, deer, antelope, and giraffes (all of which are kosher) do, because it does not meet the cloven hoof criterion. Like these animals, camels (and llamas) are ruminants with a multi-chambered stomach. Camels are even-toed ungulates, with feet split in two. However, a camel's feet form soft pads rather than hard hooves.

In Islam, the eating of camels is allowed, and is indeed traditional in the Islamic heartland in Saudi Arabia and the Arabian Peninsula.

=== Cattle ===
Cattle hold a traditional place as objects of reverence in countries such as India. Some Hindus, particularly Brahmins, are vegetarian and strictly abstain from eating meat. Most of those who do eat meat abstain from the consumption of beef, as the cow holds a sacred place in Hinduism. For example, tradition states that the goddess Kamadhenu manifests herself as a wish-granting divine cow, with such stories repeated over generations.

In contrast to cow slaughter, consumption of dairy products such as milk, yogurt, and particularly ghee (a form of butter) is highly common in India. Cow-derived products play a significant role in Hinduism with milk particularly being highly revered, often being used in holy ceremonies.

By Indian law, the slaughter of female cattle is banned in almost all Indian states except Kerala, West Bengal and the seven north eastern states. A person involved in either cow slaughter or its illegal transportation could be jailed in many states. Slaughter of cows is an extremely provocative issue for many Hindus.

Some Chinese Buddhists discourage the consumption of beef, although it is not considered taboo. However, for Sinhalese Buddhists, it is taboo and considered to be ungrateful to kill the animal whose milk and labour provides livelihoods to many Sinhalese people.

Burmese Buddhists also have a taboo against eating beef, because they consider cows as an animal responsible for working in the fields with human beings. However, it is not strictly considered taboo in cities such as Mandalay and Yangon.

In the town of Kudus on the Indonesian island of Java, there is also a taboo on eating beef, despite most people being Muslim, to avoid offending Hindus.

=== Chewing gum ===
A chewing gum sales ban has been in place since 1992 in Singapore. It is currently not illegal to chew gum in Singapore, merely to import it and sell it, with certain exceptions. Since 2004, an exception has existed for therapeutic, dental, and nicotine chewing gum, which can be bought from a doctor or registered pharmacist.

=== Chickens ===
Ibrahim ibn Yaqub, a Jewish traveler who visited Slavic territories in the 10th century, described the meat-eating habits of the ancestors of Poles. He saw that these Slavs did not eat chickens because they believed chicken causes a loss of strength and a red rash. Some who practice Slavic paganism will abide by this taboo to this day.

=== Crustaceans and other seafood ===
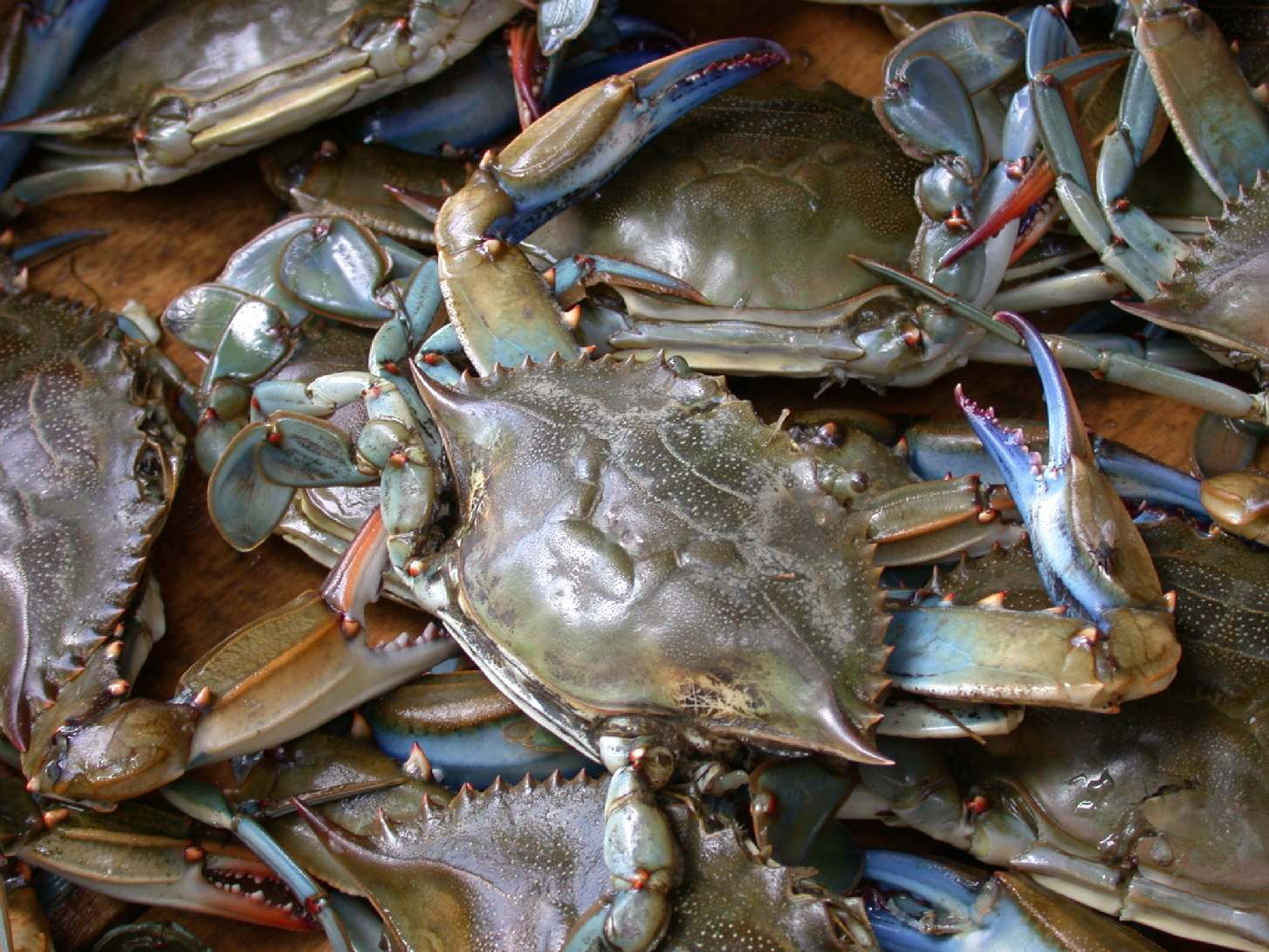
Blue crabs, Callinectes sapidus, for sale at a market in Piraeus.

Almost all types of non-piscine seafood, such as shellfish, lobster, shrimp or crayfish, are forbidden by Judaism because such animals live in water but do not have both fins and scales.

As a general rule, all seafood is permissible in the 3 madh'hab of Sunni Islam except Hanafi school of thought. The Ja'fari school of Islamic jurisprudence, which is followed by most Shia Muslims, prohibits non-piscine (lacking scales) seafood, with the exception of shrimp.

=== Honey ===
Honey is concentrated nectar and honeydew which has been regurgitated by bees. It is considered kosher even though honey bees are not, an apparent exception to the normal rule that products of an unclean animal are also unclean. This topic is covered in the Talmud and is explained to be permissible on the grounds that the bee does not originally make the first honey, the flower does, while the bees store and dehydrate the liquid into honey. This is different from royal jelly, which is produced by bees directly and is considered non-kosher.

Some vegans avoid honey as they would any other animal product.

=== Insects ===
In Judaism and Samaritanism, certain locusts could be kosher foods (Leviticus 11:22). Otherwise, insects are considered nonkosher. Kashrut also requires that practitioners check other foods carefully for insects.

In Islam, the eating of most insects is prohibited, but locusts are considered lawful food and do not require ritual slaughtering.

=== Dogs ===
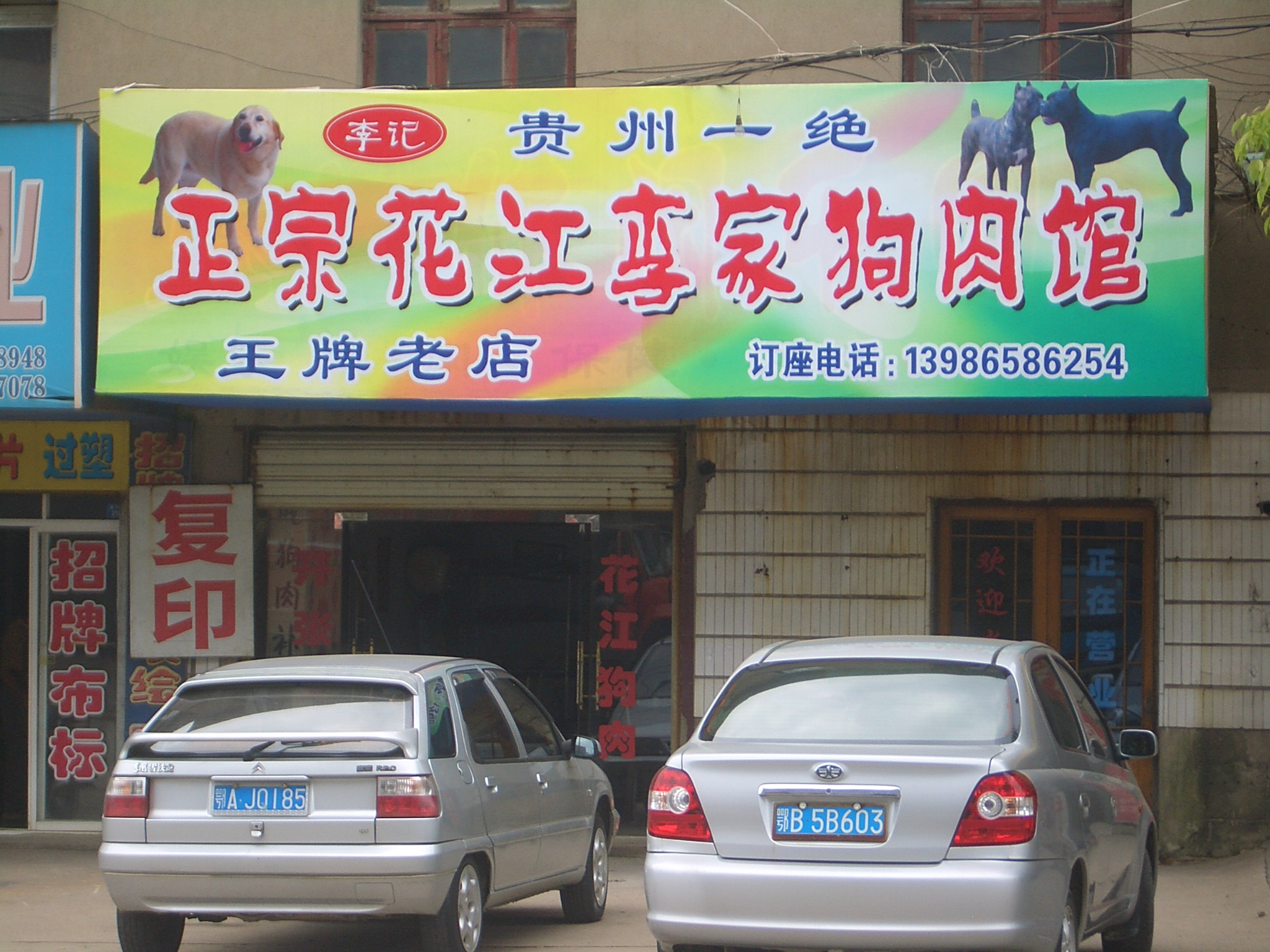
Dog meat advertised as a "Guizhou specialty" in Hubei, People's Republic of China.

In Western countries, eating dog meat is generally considered taboo, though that taboo has been broken under threat of starvation in the past. Dog meat has been eaten in every major German crisis at least since the time of Frederick the Great, and is commonly referred to as "blockade mutton". In the early 20th century, consumption of dog meat in Germany was common. Suspicions about the provenance of Frankfurter meat sold by German immigrants in the United States led to the coinage of the term 'hot dog'. In 1937, a meat inspection law targeting trichinella was introduced for pigs, dogs, boars, foxes, badgers, and other carnivores. Dog meat has been prohibited in Germany since 1986. In 2009 a scandal erupted when a farm near the Polish town of Częstochowa was discovered rearing dogs to be rendered down into smalec—‌lard.

In Switzerland, an article in 2012 by The Local reported the continued consumption of dogs within the nation. Speculation arose suggesting that farmers in the German-speaking cantons of Appenzell and St. Gallen were known to personally slaughter these animals.

According to the ancient Hindu scriptures (cf. Manusmṛti and medicinal texts like Sushruta Samhita), dog's meat was regarded as the most unclean (and rather poisonous) food possible. Dog's meat is also regarded as unclean under Jewish and Islamic dietary laws; therefore, consumption of dog meat is forbidden by both of those religious traditions.

In Irish mythology, legend recounts how Cú Chulainn, the great hero of Ulster whose name means Culann's Hound, was presented with a Morton's fork, forcing him to either break his geis (taboo) about eating dog meat or declining hospitality; Cú Chulainn chose to eat the meat, leading ultimately to his death.

In Mexico, in the pre-Columbian era, a hairless breed of dog named xoloitzcuintle was commonly eaten. After colonization, this custom stopped.

In East Asia, most countries rarely consume dog meat with the exception of China, Vietnam, North and South Korea either because of Islamic or Buddhist values or animal rights as in Taiwan. Manchus have a prohibition against the eating of dog meat, which is sometimes consumed by the Manchus' neighboring Northeastern Asian peoples. The Manchus also avoid the wearing of hats made of dog's fur. In addition to Manchus, Chinese Mongol, Miao, Muslims, Tibetan, Yao and Yi have a taboo against dog meat. In Indonesia, due to its majority Islamic population, consuming dog meat is prohibited, with exception of Christian Batak and Minahasan ethnic groups that traditionally consumed dog meat.

The Urapmin people of the New Guinea Highlands do not kill or eat dogs, unlike some neighboring tribes, nor do they let dogs breathe on their food.

=== Bears ===
Bears are not considered kosher animals in Judaism. Bear meat, like all predatory terrestrial animals, is forbidden by Islam.

=== Cats ===
There is a strong taboo against eating cats in many Western parts of the world, including most of the Americas and Europe. Cat meat is forbidden by Jewish and Islamic law as both religions forbid the eating of carnivores. Cats are commonly regarded as pets in Western countries, or as working animals, kept to control vermin, not as a food animal, and consumption of cats is thus seen as a barbaric act by a large part of the population in those countries.

In Switzerland, a 2012 report by The Local also highlighted the consumption of cats within the country.

=== Eggs ===
Consumption of eggs is permissible in all Abrahamic faiths.

Jains abstain from eating eggs. Many Hindu and Orthodox Sikh vegetarians also refrain from eating eggs.

An egg that naturally contains a spot of blood may not be eaten under Jewish and Islamic tradition, but eggs without any blood are commonly consumed (and are not considered to be meat, so may be eaten with dairy).

=== Elephants ===
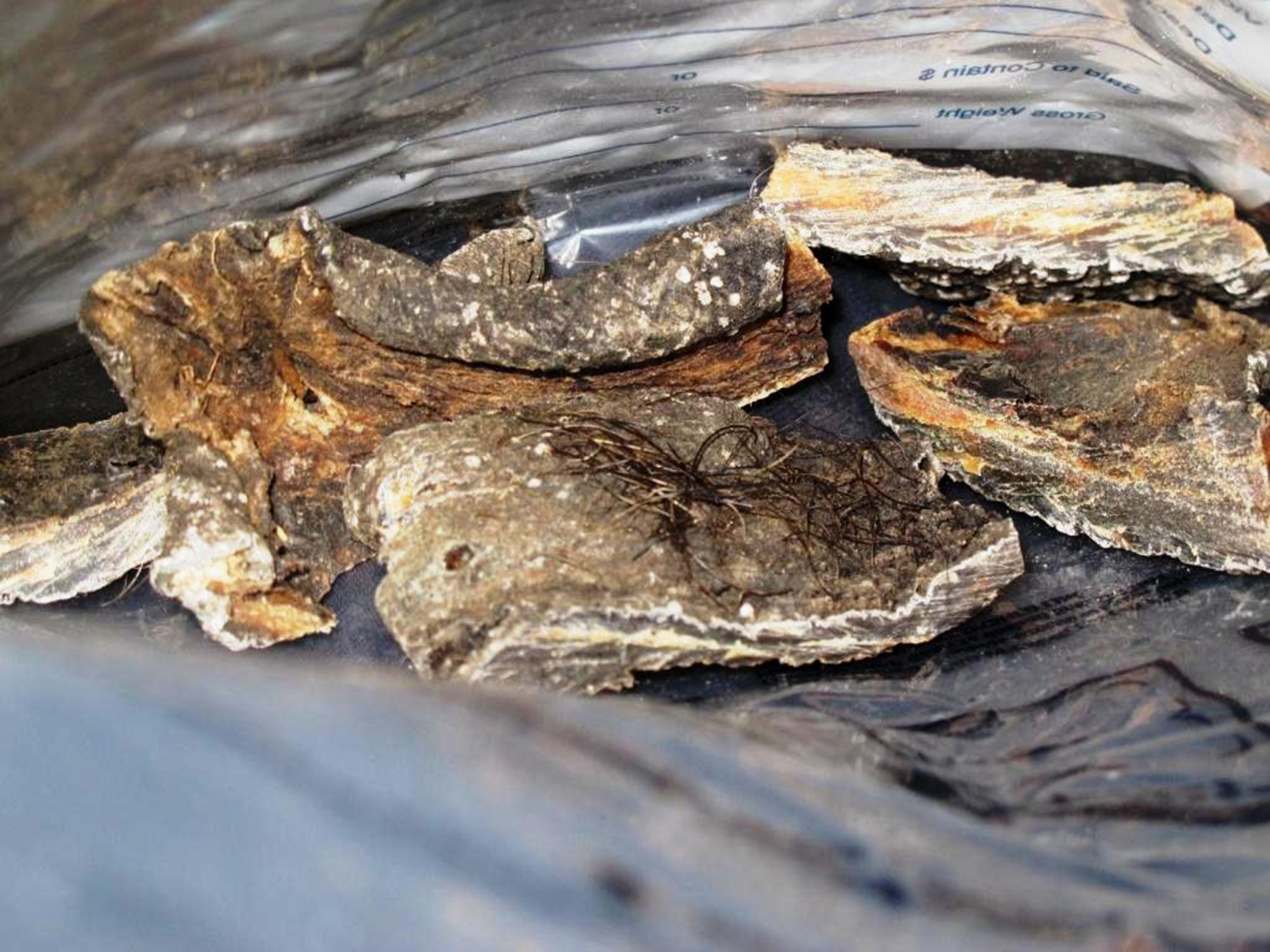
Elephant meat that was seized by U.S. Customs and Border Protection officers.

Buddhists are forbidden from eating elephant meat.

Elephant meat is also not considered kosher by Jewish dietary laws because elephants do not have cloven hooves and are not ruminants.

Some scholars of Islamic dietary laws have ruled that it is forbidden for Muslims to eat elephant because elephants fall under the prohibited category of fanged or predatory animals.

Hindus strictly avoid any contact with elephant meat due to the importance of the god Ganesha who is widely worshipped by Hindus.

The Kalika Purana distinguishes bali (sacrifice) and mahabali (great sacrifice) for the ritual killing of goats and elephants respectively, though the reference to humans in Shakti theology is symbolic and done in effigy in modern times.

=== Fish ===
Among the Somali people, most clans have a taboo against the consumption of fish, and do not intermarry with the few occupational clans that do eat it. A Somali nomad taunt is "Speak not to me with a mouth that eats fish."

There are taboos on eating fish among many upland pastoralists and agriculturalists (and even some coastal peoples) inhabiting parts of Ethiopia, Eritrea, Somalia, Kenya, and northern Tanzania. This is sometimes referred to as the "Cushitic fish-taboo", as Cushitic speakers are believed to have been responsible for the introduction of fish avoidance to East Africa, though not all Cushitic groups avoid fish. The zone of the fish taboo roughly coincides with the area where Cushitic languages are spoken, and as a general rule, speakers of Nilo-Saharan and Semitic languages do not have this taboo, and indeed many are watermen. The few Bantu and Nilotic groups in East Africa that do practice fish avoidance also reside in areas where Cushites appear to have lived in earlier times. Within East Africa, the fish taboo is found no further than Tanzania. This is attributed to the local presence of the tsetse fly and in areas beyond, which likely acted as a barrier to further southern migrations by wandering pastoralists, the principal fish-avoiders. Zambia and Mozambique's Bantus were therefore spared subjugation by pastoral groups, and they consequently nearly all consume fish.

There is also another center of fish avoidance in Southern Africa, among mainly Bantu speakers. It is not clear whether this disinclination developed independently or whether it was introduced. It is certain, however, that no avoidance of fish occurs among southern Africa's earliest inhabitants, the Khoisan. Nevertheless, since the Bantu of southern Africa also share various cultural traits with the pastoralists further north in East Africa, it is believed that, at an unknown date, the taboo against the consumption of fish was similarly introduced from East Africa by cattle-herding peoples who somehow managed to get their livestock past the aforementioned tsetse fly endemic regions.

Certain species of fish, such as the freshwater eel (Anguillidae) and all species of catfish, are also forbidden by Judaism. Although they live in water, they appear to have no scales (except under a microscope) (see Leviticus 11:10-13). Sunni Muslim laws are more flexible in this. Catfish and shark are generally seen as halal as they are special types of fish. Eel is generally considered permissible in the four Sunni madh'hab. The Ja'fari jurisprudence followed by most Shia Muslims forbids all species of fish that do not have scales, as well as all shell fish species except prawns.

Many tribes of the Southwestern United States, including the Navajo, Apache, and Zuñi, have a taboo against fish and other aquatic animals, including waterfowl.

The people of the Blackfoot Confederacy have a taboo against the consumption of fish (as well as birds including waterfowl, though the fish taboo has endured the most through generations). According to a lecture by Grant Manyheads of Blackfoot Crossing Historical Park, the Blackfoot's cuisine was based in a belief that only certain animals, those with four legs and hooves and which grazed on grass, were seen as "clean" and thus suitable for consumption. This meant that any other animals, including fish, birds (especially waterfowl), and clawed animals such as bears and dogs or wolves, were not considered suitable or clean enough to eat. However, this taboo was broken in times of need and starvation. Breaking the taboo was seen as an especially desperate act among the Blackfoot, but was not seen to carry any particular religious or spiritual repercussions, hence the allowance of breaking the taboo out of desperation.

Norse settlers in Greenland (10th–15th centuries AD) may have developed a taboo against fish consumption, as recounted in Jared Diamond's Collapse: How Societies Choose to Fail or Succeed. This is unusual, as Norsemen did not generally have a taboo against fish, Diamond noting that "Fish bones account for much less than 0.1% of animal bones recovered at Greenland Norse archeological sites, compared to between 50 and 95% at most contemporary Iceland, northern Norway, and Shetland sites." However, this has been disputed by archaeologists.

=== Foie gras ===
Foie gras, the fatty liver of geese that have been force-fed according to French law, has been the subject of controversy and prohibitions exist in different parts of the world. In July 2014, India banned the import of foie gras making it the first and only country in the world to do so, causing dismay among some of the nation's chefs. In Australia, the production of foie gras is currently forbidden, though it is legal to import it. In August 2003, Argentina banned foie gras production as it is considered a mistreatment or an act of cruelty to animals. In 2023 foie gras production was banned in the Flemish Region of Belgium.

=== Animal fetuses ===
Many countries observe this as a delicacy but it is a taboo in most countries. Fetuses of goats and sheep are a delicacy in Anglo-Indian culture, despite being taboo in both parent cultures (English and Indian). This Anglo-Indian dish is known as "kutti pi" (fetus bag).

=== Fungi ===
Vedic Brahmins, Gaudiya Vaishnavas, tantriks and some Buddhist priests abstain from fungi, which are eschewed as they grow at night.

In Sweden and most of Scandinavia mushrooms and fungi were traditionally not eaten due to strong associations with folklore. This began to change in the 17th century, when the French influenced upper class adopted mushrooms into their diet, and began to promote the consumption of mushrooms throughout the 19th and early 20th centuries, which has since lead to mushroom eating and collecting becoming normalised.

=== Guinea pig and related rodents ===
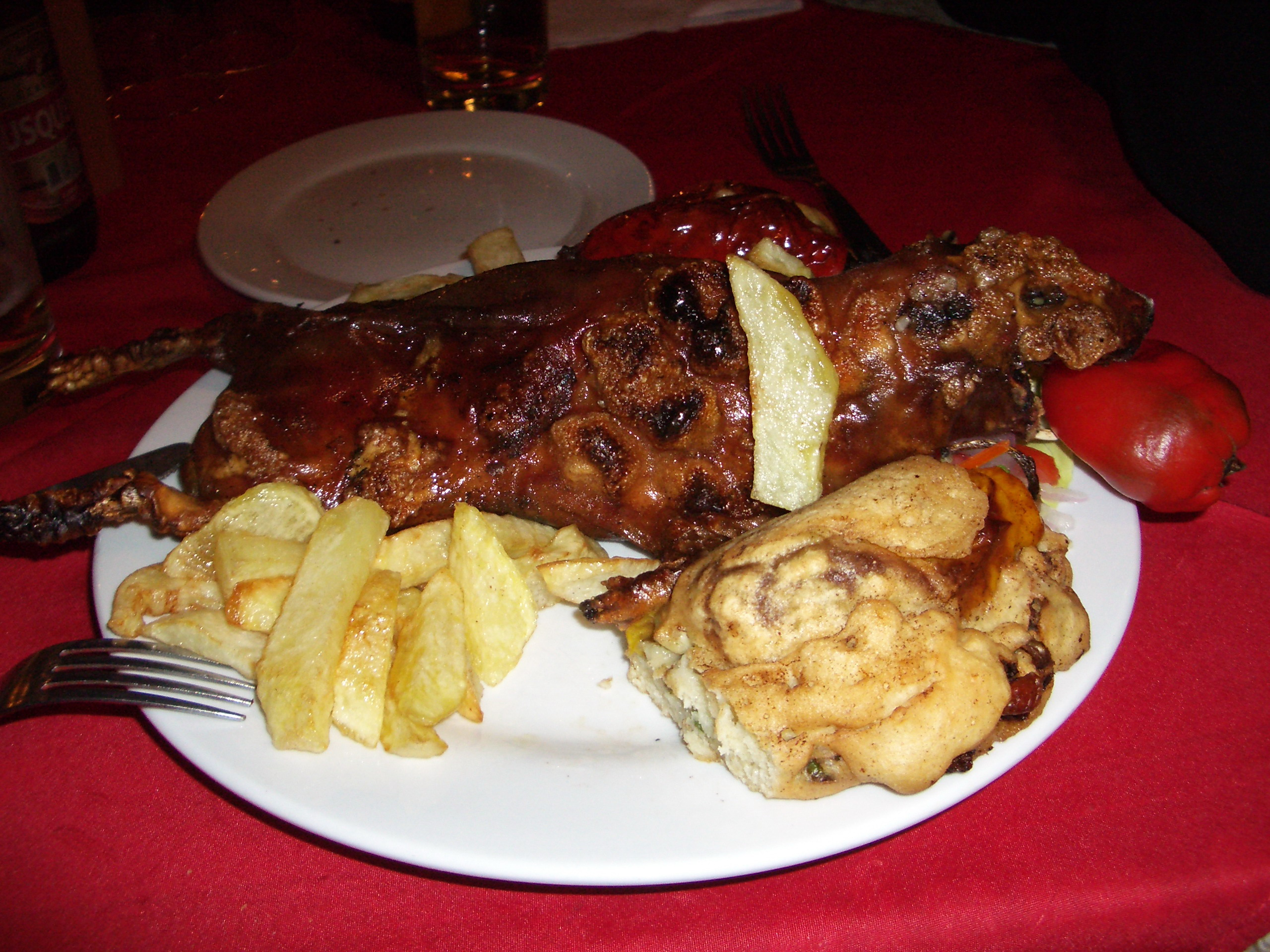
Roast guinea pig (Cavia porcellus) in Peru

Guinea pigs, or cuy, are commonly eaten in Peru, in the southwestern cities and villages of Colombia, and among some populations in the highlands of Ecuador, mostly in the Andes highlands. Cuyes can be found on the menu of restaurants in Lima and other cities in Peru, as well as in Pasto, Colombia. Guinea pig meat is exported to the United States and European nations. In 2004, the New York City Department of Parks and Recreation took legal action to stop vendors serving cuy at an Ecuadorian festival in Flushing Meadows Park. New York State allows the consumption of guinea pigs, but New York City prohibits it. Accusations of cultural persecution have since been leveled.

=== Giraffe ===
Although giraffes are technically considered kosher (since they chew their cuds and have split hooves), the more orthodox interpretation of Kashrut still forbids consumption of the meat, therefore marking the giraffe, despite with otherwise permissible characteristics, as non-kosher. The reason is the animal has no tradition of permissibility, meaning not allowed to be eaten, despite its signs of being a kosher animal. In addition, its large size and more aggressive behaviour puts a strain on logistics when performing shechita (ritual slaughtering). Their vulnerable status has also played a role in prohibition by many rabbis. The long neck of the giraffe being difficult to perform the slaughter is not the reason why giraffe is non-kosher, despite this sometimes being presumed.

=== Horse meat ===
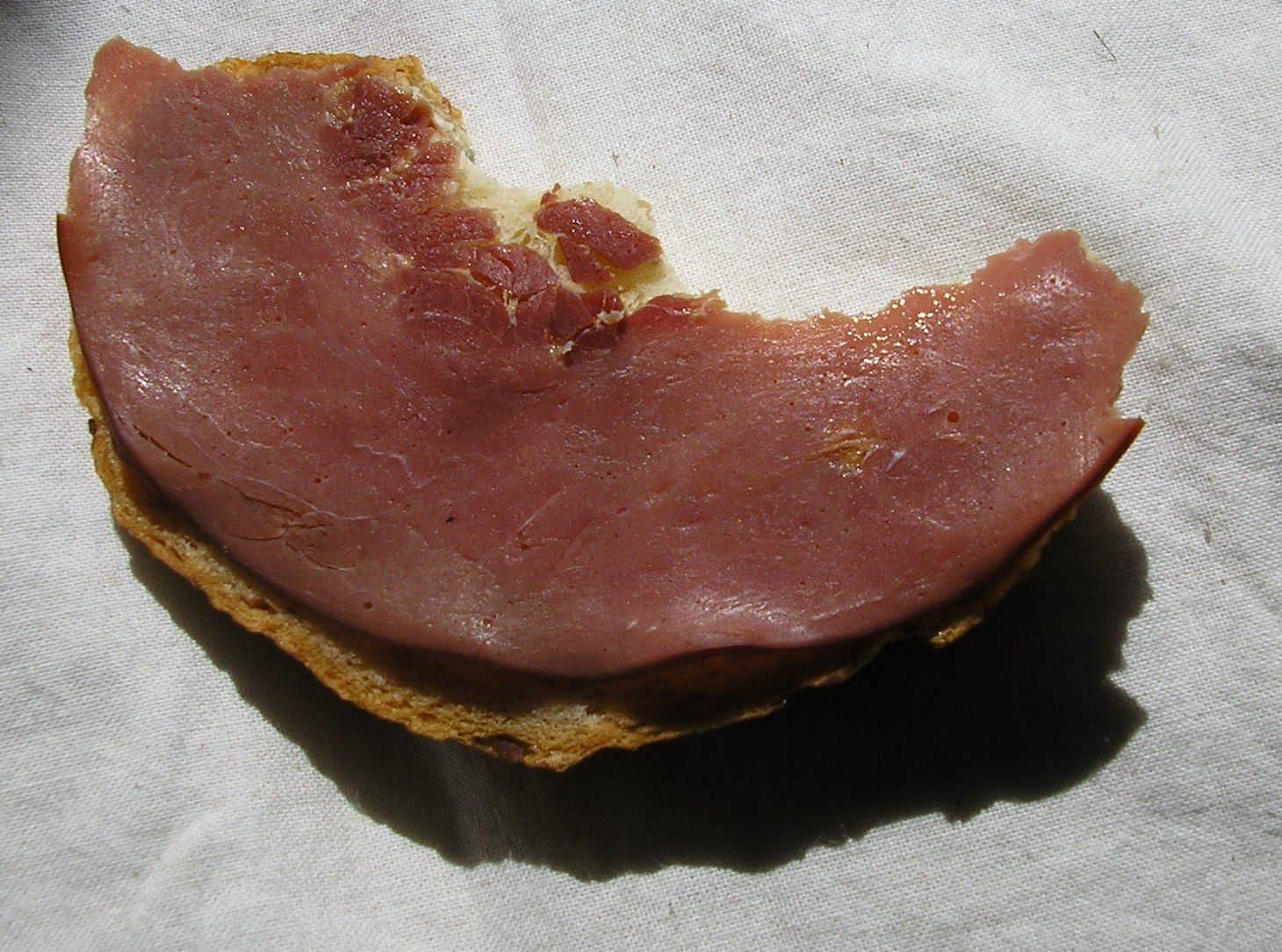
Smoked and salted horse meat on a sandwich.

Horse meat is part of the cuisine of many countries in Europe, but is taboo in some religions and many countries. It is forbidden by Jewish law, because the horse is not a ruminant, nor does it have cloven hooves. Similarly to dogs, eating horses was a taboo for the Castro culture in Northwestern Portugal, and it is still a counter-cultural practice in the region.

Horse meat is forbidden by some sects of Christianity. In 732 CE, Pope Gregory III instructed Saint Boniface to suppress the pagan practice of eating horses, calling it a "filthy and abominable custom". The Christianisation of Iceland in 1000 CE was achieved only when the Church promised that Icelanders could continue to eat horsemeat; once the Church had consolidated its power, the allowance was discontinued. Horsemeat is still popular in Iceland and is sold and consumed in the same way as beef, lamb and pork.

In Islam, opinions vary as to the permissibility of horse meat. Some cite a hadith forbidding it to Muslims, but others doubt its validity and authority. Wild horses and asses are generally seen as halal while domesticated donkeys are viewed as forbidden. Various Muslim cultures have differed in the attitude in eating the meat. Historically, Turks and Persians have eaten the meat, while in North Africa this is rare.

In Canada, horse meat is legal. Most Canadian horse meat is exported to Continental Europe or Japan. In the United States, sale and consumption of horse meat is illegal in California and Illinois. However, it was sold in the US during WW II, since beef was expensive, rationed and destined for the troops. The last horse meat slaughterhouse in the US was closed in 2007. Nevertheless, discarded leisure, sport and work horses are collected and sold at auctions. They are shipped across the country by transporters to the borders of Canada in the north and Mexico in the south to be sold to horse meat butchers. The issue of horse consumption in the UK and Ireland was raised in 2013 with regards to the 2013 horse meat contamination scandal.

Horse meat is generally avoided in the Balkans (though not in Slovenia), either due to the horse being considered a noble animal or because eating horse meat is associated with war-time famine. However, it has a small niche market in Serbia.

=== Humans ===
Of all the taboo meat, human flesh ranks as the most heavily proscribed. In recent times, humans have consumed the flesh of fellow humans in rituals and out of insanity, hatred, or overriding hunger – never as a common part of their diet, but it is thought that the practice was once widespread among all humans.

The Fore people of Papua New Guinea engaged in funerary cannibalism until the Australian government prohibited the practice in the late 1950s. Cannibalism was how the prion disease kuru spread, though the link was unproven until 1967.

The consumption of human flesh is forbidden by Hinduism, Islam, and Rabbinic Judaism.

=== Primates (apes, monkeys, etc.) ===
Monkey brains is a dish consisting of, at least partially, the brain of some species of monkey or ape. In Western popular culture, its consumption is repeatedly portrayed and debated, often in the context of portraying exotic cultures as exceptionally cruel, callous, and/or strange.

Monkeys are revered animals in India, largely because of the monkey god Hanuman. Many Hindus are vegetarian and do not eat any type of meat, including monkeys. Meat eating Indians also do not kill or eat monkeys. Killing and eating monkeys (or other animals which are considered wild) is both taboo and illegal in India.

In traditional Islamic dietary laws, the eating of monkeys is also forbidden.

In Malagasy culture, lemurs are considered to have souls (ambiroa) which can get revenge if mocked while alive or if killed in a cruel fashion. Because of this, lemurs, like many other elements of daily life, have been a source of taboos, known locally as fady, which can be based around stories with four basic principles. A village or region may believe that a certain type of lemur may be the ancestor of the clan. They may also believe that a lemur's spirit may get revenge. Alternatively, the animal may appear as a benefactor. Lemurs are also thought to impart their qualities, good or bad, onto human babies. In general, fady extend beyond a sense of the forbidden, but can include events that bring bad luck.

Primate species offered fresh and smoked in 2009 at a wildlife market by Liberia's Cavally River included chimpanzee (Pan troglodytes), Diana monkey (Cercopithecus diana), putty-nosed monkey (C. nictitans), lesser spot-nosed monkey (C. petaurista), Campbell's mona monkey (C. campbelli), sooty mangabey (Cercocebus atys), king colobus (Colobus polykomos), olive colobus (Procolobus verus), western red colobus (P. badius).

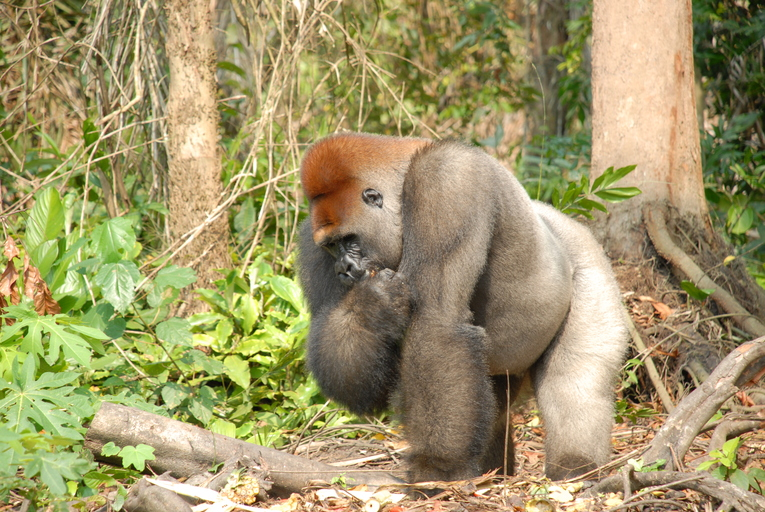
A gorilla in the Democratic Republic of the Congo, 2008

Between 1983 and 2002, the Gabon populations of western gorilla (Gorilla gorilla) and common chimpanzee (Pan troglodytes) were estimated to have declined by 56%. This decline was primarily caused by the commercial hunting, which was facilitated by the extended infrastructure for logging purposes.

In the late 1990s, fresh and smoked bonobo (Pan paniscus) carcasses were observed in Basankusu in the Province of Équateur in the Congo Basin.

Some people consider consumption of primates to be close to human cannibalism due to monkeys and apes being close relatives of human beings.

=== Kangaroo ===
Kangaroo meat has long been a significant part of some indigenous Australian diets. Kangaroo meat was legalised for human consumption in South Australia in 1980, though in other states it could only be sold as pet food until 1993. Kangaroos, along with most other native Australian animals, are protected under Australian law on a state and federal level, but licences to kill kangaroos can be acquired for hunting or culling purposes. Though kangaroo meat was once unpopular with modern Australians, it has become a lot more popular in recent years due to its reputation as a low-fat and low-emission meat, and can be found in most supermarkets.

Kangaroo meat is illegal in California. The ban was first imposed in 1971; a moratorium was put in place in 2007, allowing the importation of the meat, but the ban was re-implemented in 2015. Kangaroo meat is also not considered biblically kosher by Jews or Adventists. However, it is considered halal according to Muslim dietary standards, because kangaroos are herbivorous.

=== Living animals ===
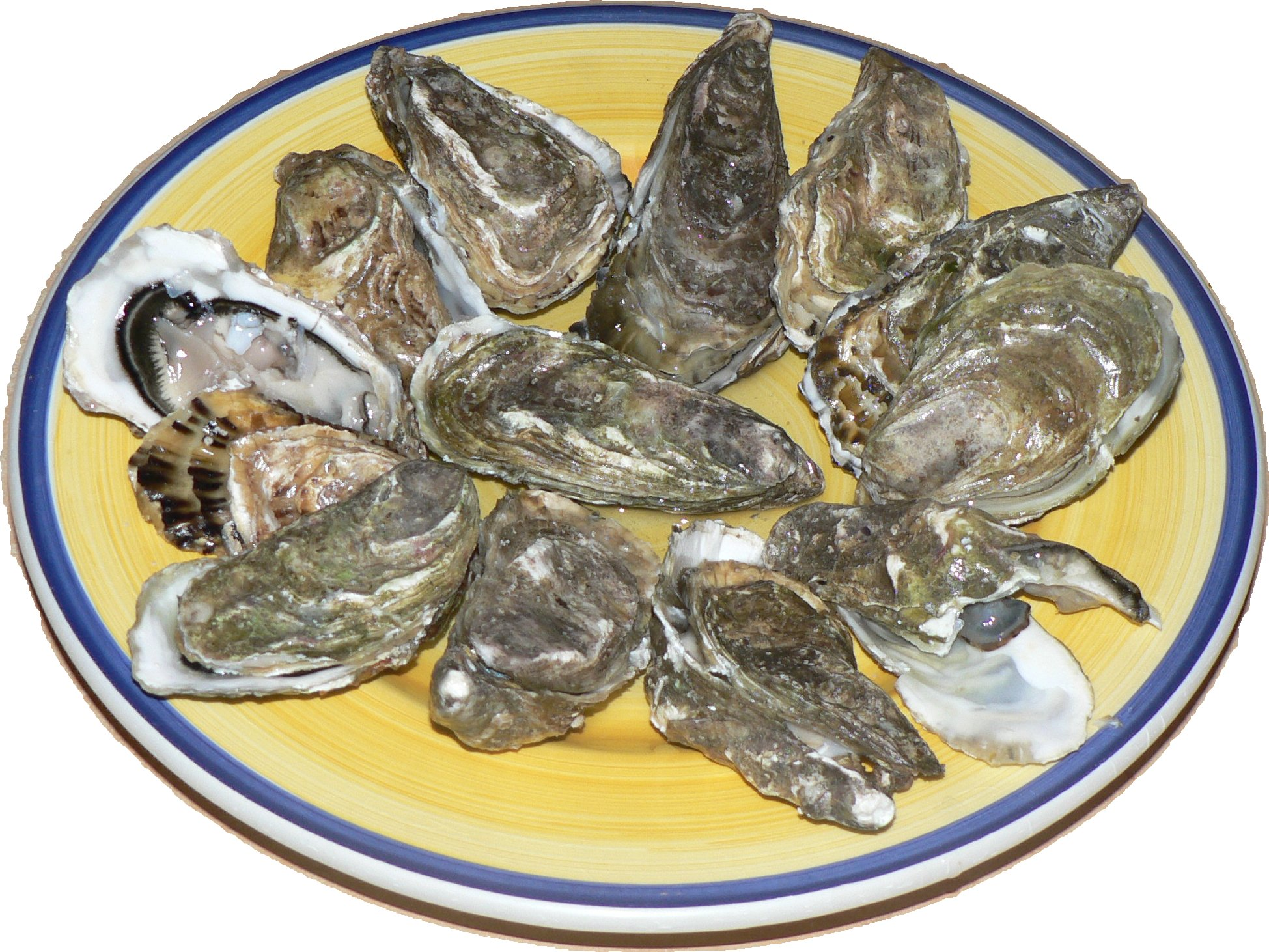
Raw oysters, which are still alive, presented on a plate.

Islamic law, Judaic law (including Noahide Law), and some laws of some Christians forbid any portion that is cut from a live animal (Genesis 9:4, as interpreted in the Talmud, Sanhedrin 59a). However, in the case of a ben pekuah where a live offspring is removed from the mother's womb, these restrictions do not apply. Eating oysters raw, ikizukuri, and other similar cases would be considered a violation of this in Jewish law.

Examples of the eating of animals that are still alive include eating live seafood, such as "raw oyster on the half shell" and ikizukuri (live fish). Sashimi using live animals has been banned in some countries.

=== Offal ===
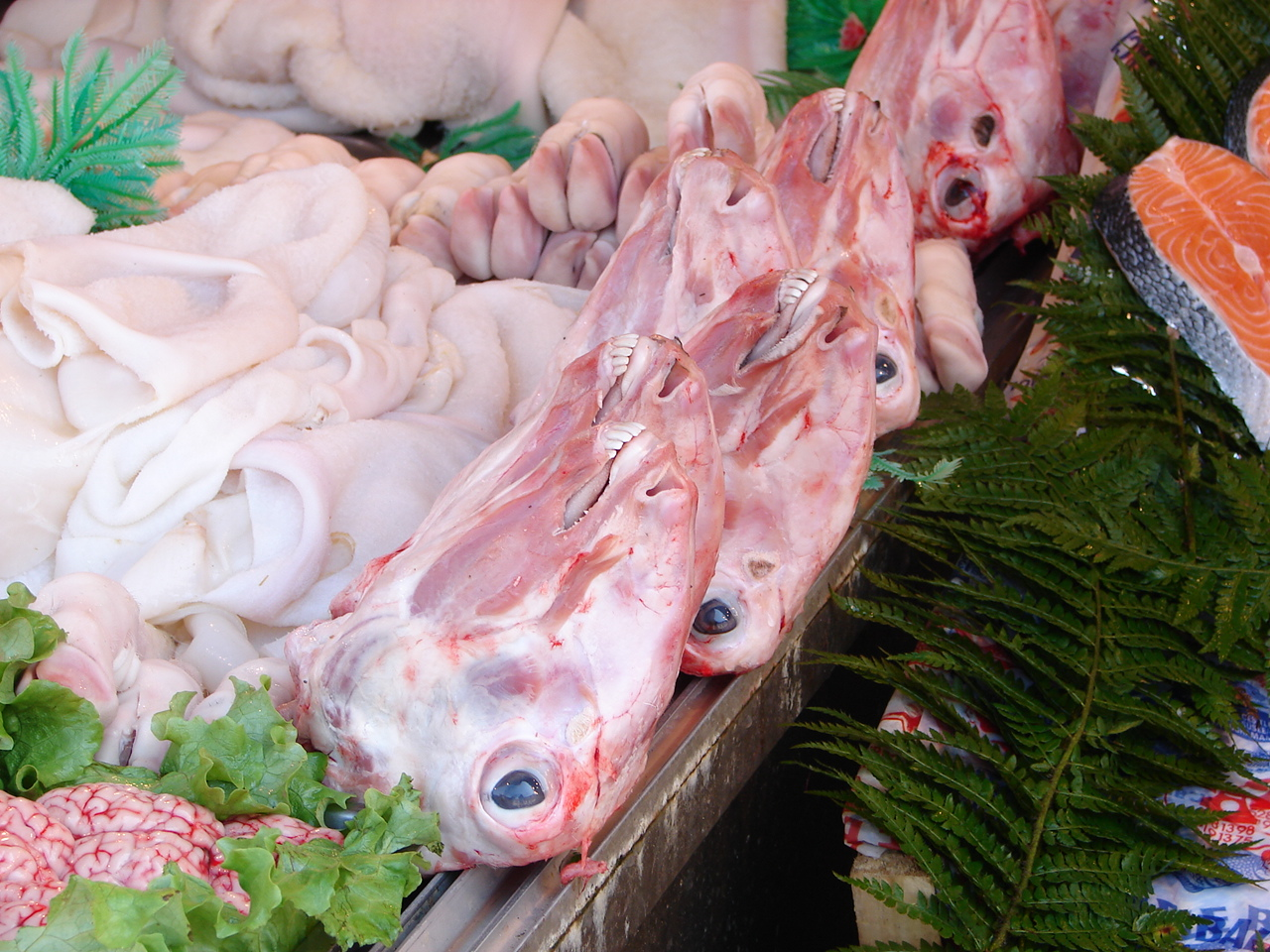
Heads, brains, trotters and tripe on sale in an Istanbul market.

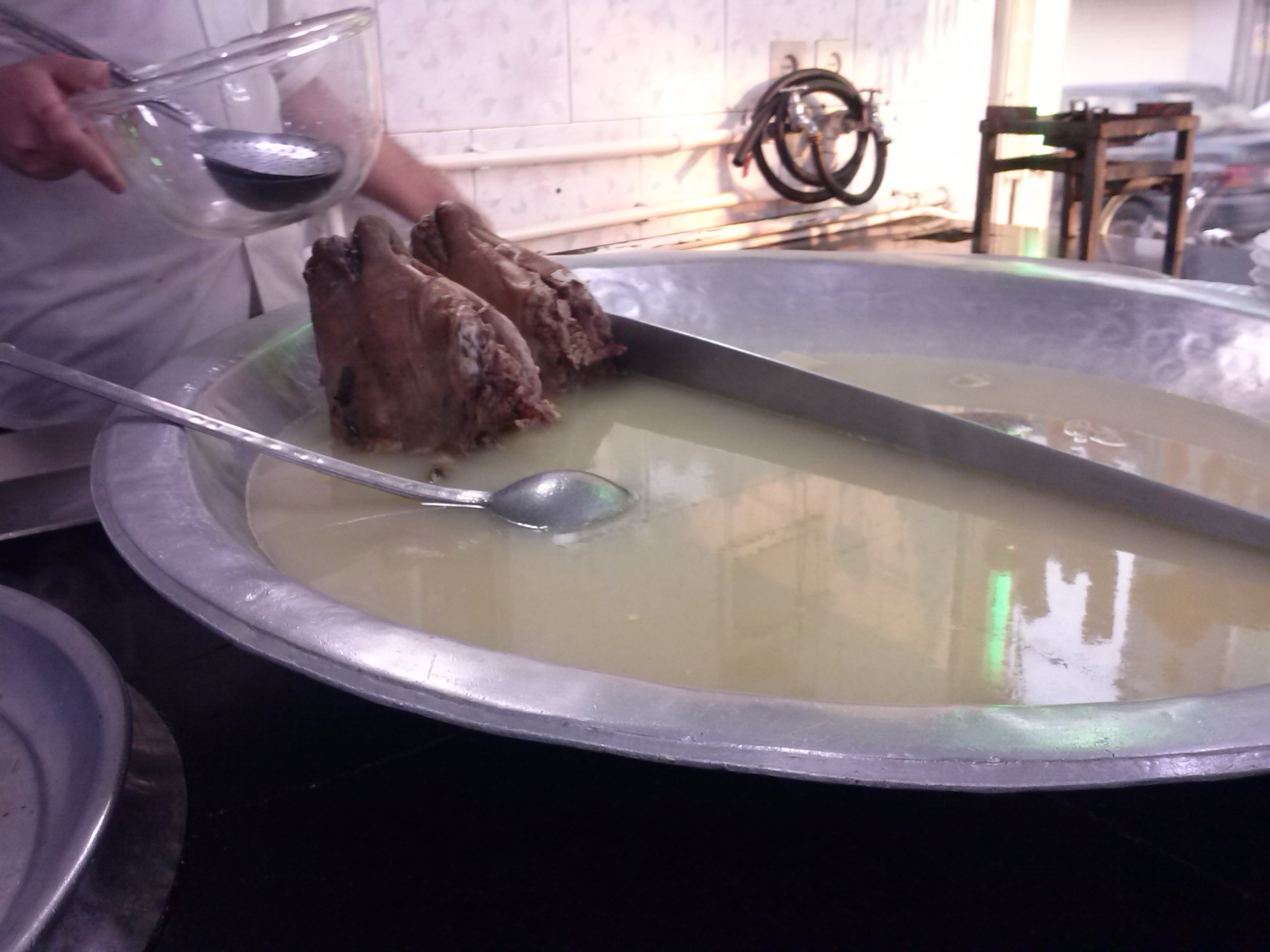
Kale Pache, a traditional soup made with lamb's head (including brain, eyes and tongues) and hooves in Iran.

Offal is the internal organs of butchered animals, and may refer to parts of the carcass such as the head and feet ("trotters") in addition to organ meats such as sweetbreads and kidney. Offal is a traditional part of many European and Asian cuisines, including such dishes as the steak and kidney pie in the United Kingdom or callos a la madrileña in Spain. Haggis has been Scotland's national dish since the time of Robert Burns. In northeast Brazil, there is a similar dish to haggis called buchada, made with goats' stomach.

Except for heart, tongue (beef), liver (chicken, beef, or pork), and intestines used as natural sausage casings, organ meats consumed in the U.S. tend to be regional or ethnic specialities; for example, tripe as menudo or mondongo among Latinos and Hispanos, chitterlings in the Southern United States, scrapple on the Eastern Seaboard, fried-brain sandwiches in the Midwest, and beef testicles called Rocky Mountain oysters or "prairie oysters" in the west. In Argentina and other Spanish language countries, bull's testicles are served as huevos de toro or 'bull's eggs'.

In some regions, such as the European Union, brains and other organs which can transmit bovine spongiform encephalopathy ("mad cow disease") and similar diseases have now been banned from the food chain as specified risk materials.

Although eating the stomach of a goat, cow, sheep, or buffalo might be taboo, ancient cheesemaking techniques utilize stomachs (which contain rennet) for turning milk into cheese, a potentially taboo process. Newer techniques for making cheese include a biochemical process with bacterial enzymes similar to rennin and chymosin. This means that the process by which cheese is made (and not the cheese itself) is a factor in determining whether it is forbidden or allowed by strict vegetarians.

=== Poppy seed ===
Poppy seeds are used as condiments in many cultures, but the trace amounts of morphine and codeine present in the seeds can lead to a false positive when administering a drug test. In Singapore, poppy seeds are classified as "prohibited goods" by the Central Narcotics Bureau (CNB).

=== Pigs/pork ===
United States Department of Agriculture (USDA) data reports pork as the most widely eaten meat in the world. Consumption of pigs is forbidden by Islam, Judaism and certain Christian denominations, such as Seventh-day Adventists. This prohibition is set out in the holy texts of the religions concerned, e.g. Qur'an 2:173, 5:3, 6:145 and 16:115, Leviticus 11:7-8 and Deuteronomy 14:8. Pigs were also taboo in at least three other cultures of the ancient Middle East: the Phoenicians, Egyptians and Babylonians. In some instances, the taboo extended beyond eating pork, and it was also taboo to touch or even look at pigs.

The original reason for this taboo is debated. Maimonides seems to have thought the uncleanness of pigs was self-evident, but mentions with particular aversion their propensity to eat feces. In the 19th century, some people attributed the pig taboo in the Middle East to the danger of the parasite trichina, but this explanation is now out of favour. James George Frazer suggested that, in ancient Israel, Egypt and Syria, the pig was originally a sacred animal, which for that reason could not be eaten or touched; the taboo survived to a time when the pig was no longer regarded as sacred, and was therefore explained by reference to its being unclean.

More recently, Marvin Harris posited that pigs are not suited for being kept in the Middle East on an ecological and socio-economical level; for example, pigs are not suited to living in arid climates because they require more water than other animals to keep them cool, and instead of grazing they compete with humans for foods such as grains. As such, raising pigs was seen as a wasteful and decadent practice. Another explanation offered for the taboo is that pigs are omnivorous, not discerning between meat or vegetation in their natural dietary habits. The willingness to consume meat sets them apart from most other domesticated animals which are commonly eaten (cattle, sheep, goats, etc.) who would naturally eat only plants. Mary Douglas has suggested that the reason for the taboo against the pig in Judaism is three-fold: (i) it transgresses the category of ungulates, because it has a split hoof but does not chew the cud, (ii) it eats carrion and (iii) it was eaten by non-Israelites.

While pork alternatives (for example, by Impossible Foods) do not contain actual pork meat, some conservative religious groups, such as Islam, regard it as forbidden, similar to its meat-based counterpart as it is the said haram or non-kosher product the pork alternative is trying to mimic and present. Lab-grown pork might also be considered haram or non-kosher.

=== Rabbit ===
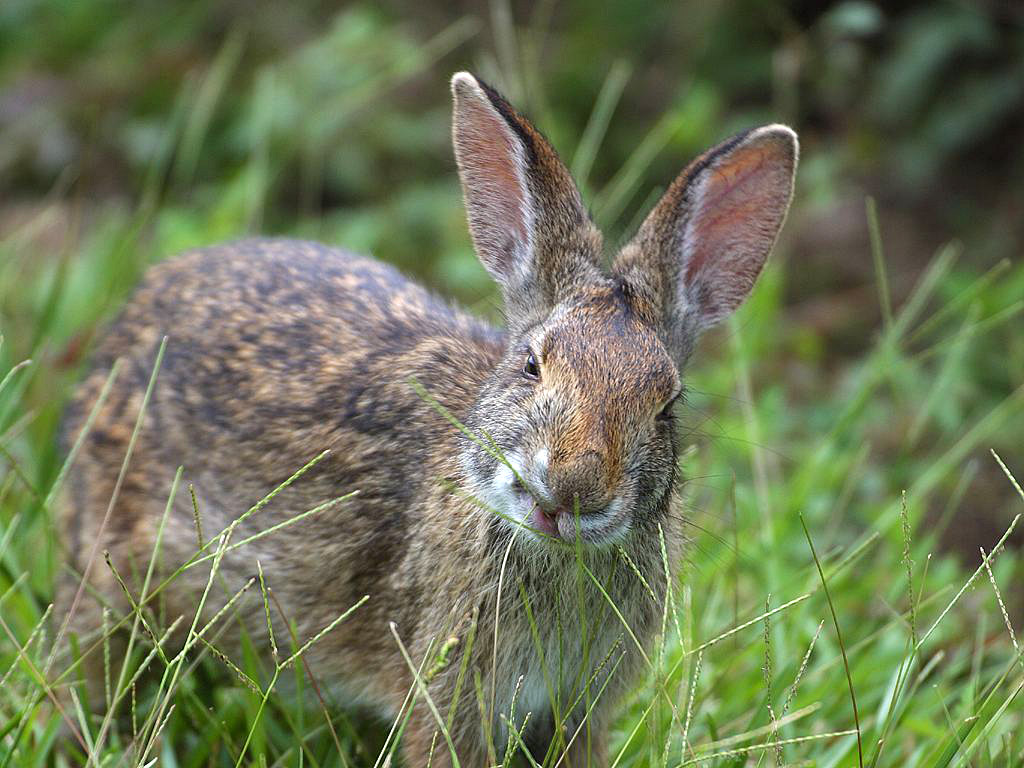
Cottontail rabbit

The book of Leviticus in the Bible classifies the rabbit as unclean because it does not have a split hoof, even though it does chew and reingest partially digested material (equivalent to "chewing the cud" among ruminants). The consumption of rabbit is allowed in Sunni Islam, and is popular in several majority-Sunni countries (e.g. Egypt, where it is a traditional ingredient in molokheyya), but it is forbidden in the Ja'fari jurisprudence of Twelver Shia Islam.

=== Rats and mice ===
In most Western cultures, rats and mice are considered either unclean vermin or pets and thus unfit for human consumption, traditionally being seen as carriers of plague.

In Ghana, Thryonomys swinderianus locally referred to as "Akrantie", "Grasscutter" and (incorrectly) "Bush rat" is a common food item. The proper common name for this rodent is "Greater Cane Rat", though actually it is not a rat at all and is a close relative of porcupines and guinea pigs that inhabit Africa, south of the Saharan Desert. In 2003, the U.S. barred the import of this and other rodents from Africa because of an outbreak of at least nine human cases of monkeypox, an illness never before seen in the Western Hemisphere.

Consumption of any sort of rodent, or material originating from rodents, is forbidden by Judaism and Islam.

=== Reptiles ===
Judaism and Islam forbid the consumption of reptiles, such as crocodiles and snakes. In other cultures, foods, such as alligator, are treasured as delicacies, and the animals are raised commercially.

=== Herbs ===
Some adherents of the Greek Orthodox Church avoid basil due to its association with the cross of Christ. It is believed that the cross was discovered in 325 AD by Saint Helen on a hill covered in beautiful, fragrant basil bushes, a hitherto unknown plant. The plant was named βασιλικόν φυτόν (basilikón fytón) "royal plant" and today is grown and admired rather than eaten. Fine basil plants are brought to church every year on 14 September to commemorate this legend in a celebration known as the Elevation of the Holy Cross.

=== Vegetables, fruits and spices ===
In certain versions of Jainism, Buddhism and Hinduism, consumption of vegetables of the onion genus are restricted. Adherents believe that these excite damaging passions. Many Hindus discourage eating onion and garlic along with non-vegetarian food during festivals or Hindu holy months of Shrawan, Puratassi and Kartik. However, shunning onion and garlic is not very popular among Hindus as compared to avoiding non-vegetarian foods, so many people do not follow this custom.

Kashmiri Brahmins forbid "strong flavored" foods. This encompasses garlic, onion, and spices such as black pepper and chili pepper, believing that pungent flavors on the tongue inflame the baser emotions.

Jains not only abstain from consumption of meat, but also do not eat root vegetables (such as carrots, potatoes, radish, turnips, etc.) as doing so kills the plant and they believe in ahimsa. In the hierarchy of living entities, overwintering plants such as onions are ranked higher than food crops such as wheat and rice. The ability of onions to observe the changing of the seasons and bloom in spring is believed to be an additional 'sense' absent in lower plants. The amount of bad karma generated depends on the number of senses the creature possesses and so it is thought prudent to avoid eating onions. This also means that in some North Indian traditions, effectively all overwintering plants are considered taboo.

Chinese Buddhist cuisine traditionally prohibits garlic, Allium chinense, asafoetida, shallot, and Allium victorialis (victory onion or mountain leek).

In Yazidism, the eating of lettuce and butter beans is taboo. The Muslim religious teacher and scholar, Falah Hassan Juma, links the sect's belief of evil found in lettuce to its long history of persecution by Muslims. Historical theory claims one ruthless potentate who controlled the city of Mosul in the 13th century ordered an early Yazidi saint executed. The enthusiastic crowd then pelted the corpse with heads of lettuce.

The followers of Pythagoras were vegetarians, and "Pythagorean" at one time came to mean "vegetarian". However, their creed prohibited the eating of beans. The reason is unclear: perhaps the flatulence they cause, perhaps as protection from potential favism, but most likely for magico-religious reasons. One legend about Pythagoras' death states that he was killed after he chose not to run through a fava bean field to escape his enemies.

Vegetables like broccoli and cauliflower, while not taboo, may be avoided by observant Jews and other religions due to the possibility of insects or worms hiding within the numerous crevices. Likewise, fruits such as blackberries and raspberries are recommended by kashrut agencies to be avoided as they cannot be cleaned thoroughly enough without destroying the fruit.

The common Egyptian dish mulukhiyah, a soup whose primary ingredient is jute leaves (which did not have any other culinary purpose), was banned by the Fatimid Caliph Al-Hakim bi-Amr Allah sometime during his reign (996-1021 CE). The ban applied to mulukhiyah, and also to other foodstuffs said to be eaten by Sunnis. While the ban was eventually lifted after the end of his reign, the Druze, who hold Al-Hakim in high regard and give him quasi-divine authority, continue to respect the ban, and do not eat mulukhiyah of any kind to this day.

=== Whales ===
Sunni Islam permits Muslims to consume the flesh of whales that have died of natural causes as there is a famous Sunni hadith which cites Muhammad's approval of such. Whale meat is forbidden (haram) in Shia Islam as whales do not have scales. In much of the world, whale meat is not eaten due to the endangerment of whales but it is not traditionally forbidden. In some countries, such as the United Kingdom, it is illegal to import whale meat into the country.

== Prohibited drinks ==
=== Alcoholic beverages ===
Some religions – including Buddhism, Islam, Jainism, Rastafari movement, Baháʼí Faith, and various branches of Christianity such as the Baptists, the Pentecostals, Methodists, the Latter-day Saints, Seventh-day Adventists and the Iglesia ni Cristo – forbid or discourage the consumption of alcoholic beverages.

The Hebrew Bible describes a Nazirite vow (Numbers 6:1-21) that includes abstinence from alcohol, specifically wine and probably barley beer (according to the Septuagint translation and the Bauer lexicon: σικερα, from the Akkadian shikaru, for barley beer). The New JPS translation is: "wine and any other intoxicant". Other versions such as the NIV prohibit both alcohol and all alcohol derived products such as wine vinegar. There is no general taboo against alcohol in Judaism.

There are also cultural taboos against the consumption of alcohol, reflected for example in the Teetotalism or Temperance movement. There is also something of a cultural taboo in several countries, against the consumption of alcohol by women during pregnancy for health reasons, as seen, for example, in the Maternity Protection Convention, 2000 by ILO.

Absinthe

Absinthe was made illegal in the United States in 1912 because of its high alcohol percentage. Absinthe was legalized again in 2007. It was rumored to have been a cause for hallucinations, giving it the nickname "The Green Fairy."

=== Blood ===
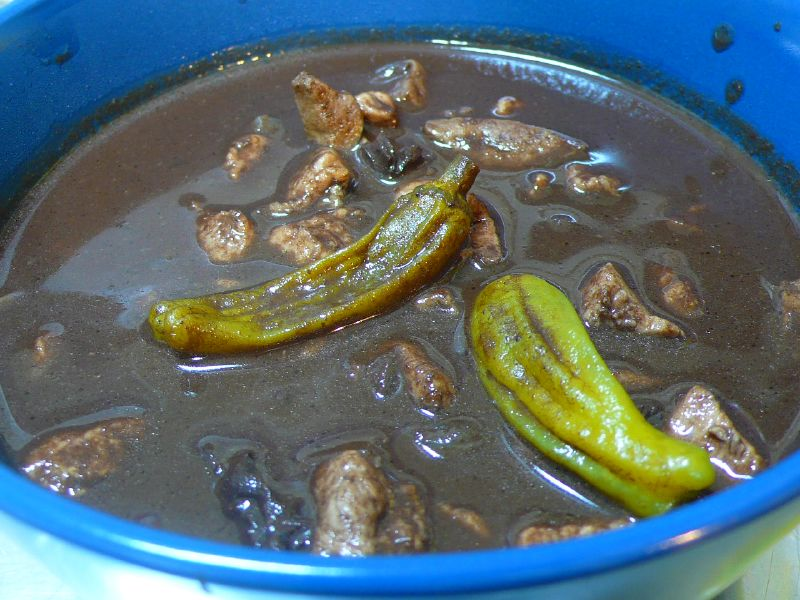
A bowl of dinuguan, a Filipino stew with pork blood

Some religions prohibit drinking or eating blood or food made from blood. In Islam the consumption of blood is prohibited (Haram). Halal animals should be properly slaughtered to drain out the blood. Unlike in other traditions, this is not because blood is revered or holy, but simply because blood is considered ritually unclean or Najis, with certain narratives prescribing ablutions (in the case of no availability of water) if contact is made with it. In Judaism all mammal and bird meat (not fish) is salted to remove the blood. Jews follow the teaching in Leviticus, that since "the life of the animal is in the blood" or "blood was reserved for the forgiveness of sins and thus reserved for God", no person may eat (or drink) the blood. Iglesia ni Cristo and Jehovah's Witnesses prohibit eating or drinking any blood.

According to the Bible, blood is only to be used for special or sacred purposes in connection with worship (Exodus chapters 12, 24, 29, Matthew 26:29 and Hebrews). In the first century, Christians, both former Jews (the Jewish Christians), and new Gentile converts, were in dispute as to which particular features of Mosaic law were to be retained and upheld by them. The Apostolic Decree suggested that, among other things, it was necessary to abstain from consuming blood:

For it seemed good to the Holy Ghost, and to us, to lay upon you no greater burden than these necessary things; That ye abstain from meats offered to idols, and from blood, and from things strangled, and from fornication: from which if ye keep yourselves, ye shall do well, Fare ye well.

— Acts 15:28–29

=== Coffee and tea ===
"Hot drinks" are taboo for members of the Church of Jesus Christ of Latter-day Saints. The term is misleading as the ban is applied exclusively to coffee and tea (i.e. not hot cocoa or herbal teas). The Word of Wisdom, a code of health used by church members, outlines prohibited and allowed substances. While not banned, some Mormons avoid caffeine in general, including cola drinks. Members of the Seventh-day Adventist Church also generally avoid caffeinated drinks.

There is a widely reported story, possibly apocryphal, that around the year 1600, some Catholics urged Pope Clement VIII to ban coffee, calling it "devil's beverage". After tasting the beverage, the pope is said to have remarked that the drink was "so delicious that it would be a sin to let only misbelievers drink it." (See the History of coffee.)

=== Human breast milk ===
While human breast milk is universally accepted for infant nutrition, some cultures see the consumption of breast milk after weaning as taboo.

== Prohibited combinations ==
Kashrut, the Jewish food regulations, classify all permissible foods into three categories: meat products, dairy products, and others, which are considered to be neither (including not just vegetable products, but also fish and eggs). A meal or dish may not contain both meat and dairy products. As well, meat and fish may not be eaten together on the same plate, although they may be eaten one directly after the other; some traditions also avoid eating fish and dairy together.

In Italian cuisine, there is a widespread taboo on serving cheese with seafood, although there are several exceptions.

== Prohibited origins ==
In the Torah, there is the bishul akum law, in which the food that has a bishul akum status means that it was fully cooked by a non-Jew and thus forbidden, even though the ingredients used to prepare the food were initially kosher in and of themselves and the prohibited combinations were to be avoided.

== See also ==
- Anthropology of religion
- Diet
- Fasting
- Haram
- Libation
- List of diets
- List of foods with religious symbolism
- Morality
- Religion and alcohol
- Religion and drugs
- Sacramental bread
- Semi-vegetarianism
- Terefah
- Kashrut
- Veganism
