= Balut (food) =

Bird embryo eaten from egg shell

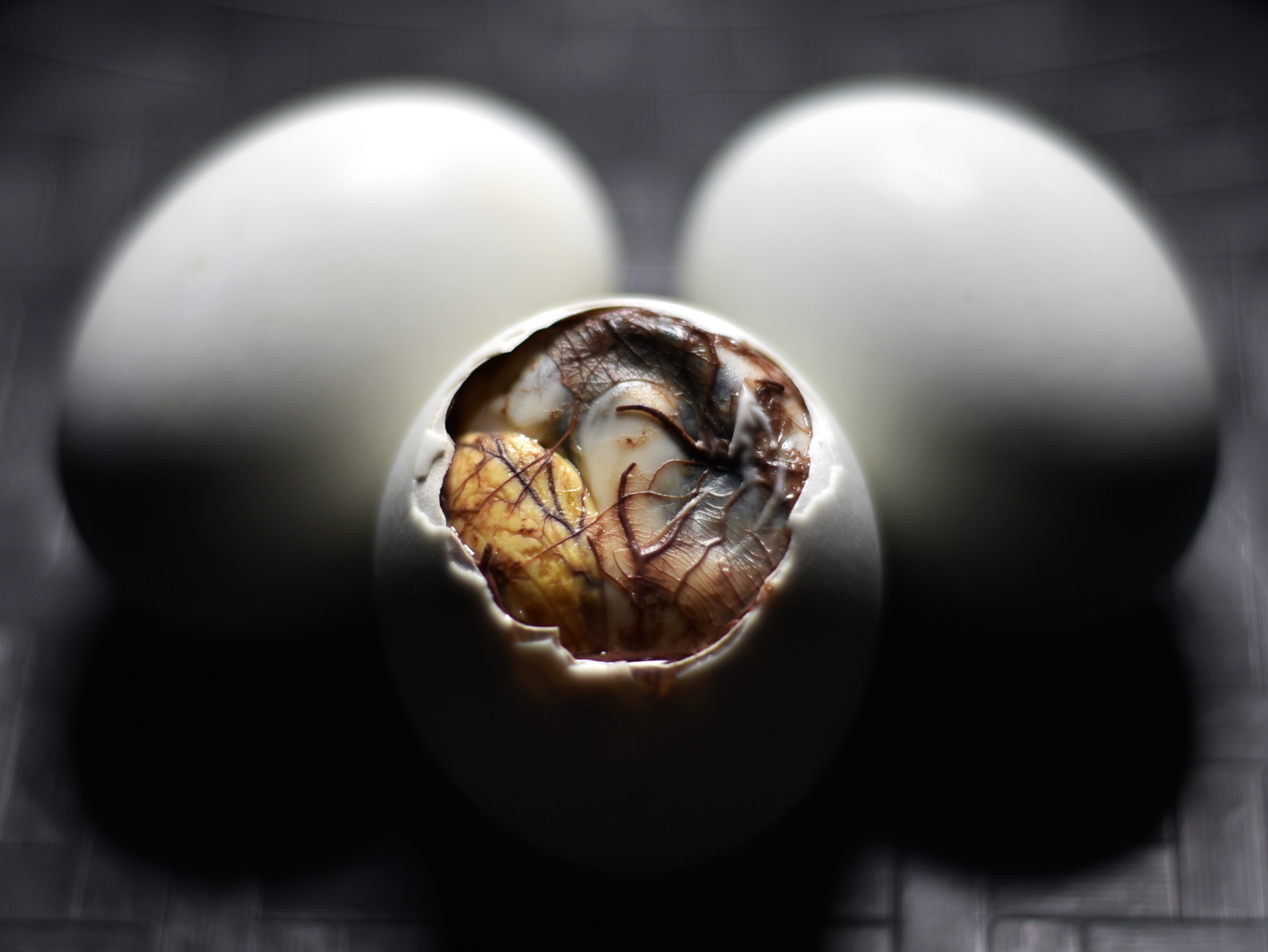
- Balut eggs, one of which is partially shelled—showing yolk, fetus, and veins running through it.
- Type: Egg
- Place of origin: Philippines
- Associated cuisine: Filipino, Cambodian, Vietnamese, Thai

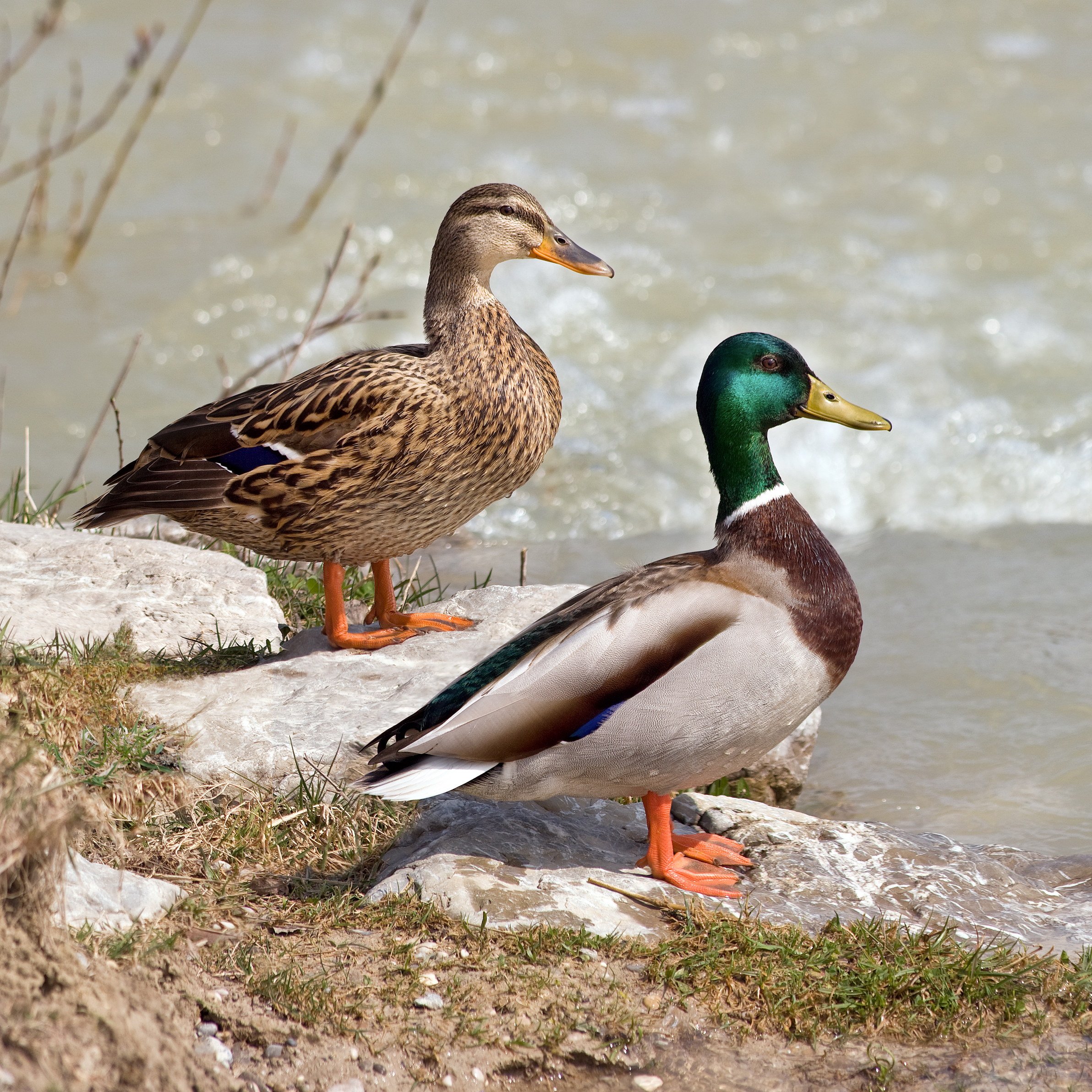
Mallard ducks are used extensively in the production of balut—female (left) and male (right).

Balut (/bəˈluːt/ bə-LOOT, /ˈbɑːluːt/ BAH-loot; also spelled as balot) is a fertilized developing egg embryo that is boiled or steamed and eaten from the shell. It is commonly sold as street food in Southeast Asia, most notably in the Philippines, Cambodia (Khmer: ពងទាកូន, romanized: paung tea kaun), and Vietnam (Vietnamese: trứng vịt lộn, hột vịt lộn), and also occasionally in Thailand (Thai: ไข่ข้าว, romanized: khai khao). Balut is often seasoned with salt and vinegar.

The length of incubation before the egg is cooked is a matter of local preference, but generally ranges from two to three weeks. Balut can cause vomiting if not cooked correctly.

== Description ==
A balut is a fertilized bird egg (usually a duck) that is incubated for a period of 14 to 21 days, depending on the local culture, and then steamed. The contents are eaten directly from the shell. Balut that is incubated for longer periods have a well-developed embryo and the features of the duckling are recognizable. The partially developed embryo bones are soft enough to chew and swallow as a whole. The mallard duck (Anas platyrhynchus), also known as the "Pateros duck", is often used to make balut. Balut is a renowned dish due to its different developmental stages; some people prefer it when the duck embryo is still largely liquid, while others prefer it when it is more mature and has a chewier texture. A combination of savory, gamey, and rich characteristics can be found in the flavor, which makes it an acquired taste that many Filipinos treasure as a culinary treat and a part of their culture.

Balut is common street food in the Philippines, Vietnam, and other localities, and is also sold in stores and malls. It is a relatively cheap source of protein and calcium. Balut was introduced to the Philippines by the Chinese in 1565, and since then balut has been included as a traditional part of the culture. Wherever Filipinos migrated for work, a large market for balut would develop. Controversies arose as knowledge of the food spread around the Southeast Asian countries and then globally. People have questioned the ethics of eating balut. Ethical concerns are most often attributed to the presence of a fertilized embryo within the dish, given the fact that the egg has not yet hatched nor been given the chance to hatch. There are also ethical concerns as to whether the embryos can feel pain at the stages balut tends to be boiled.

== Preparation ==
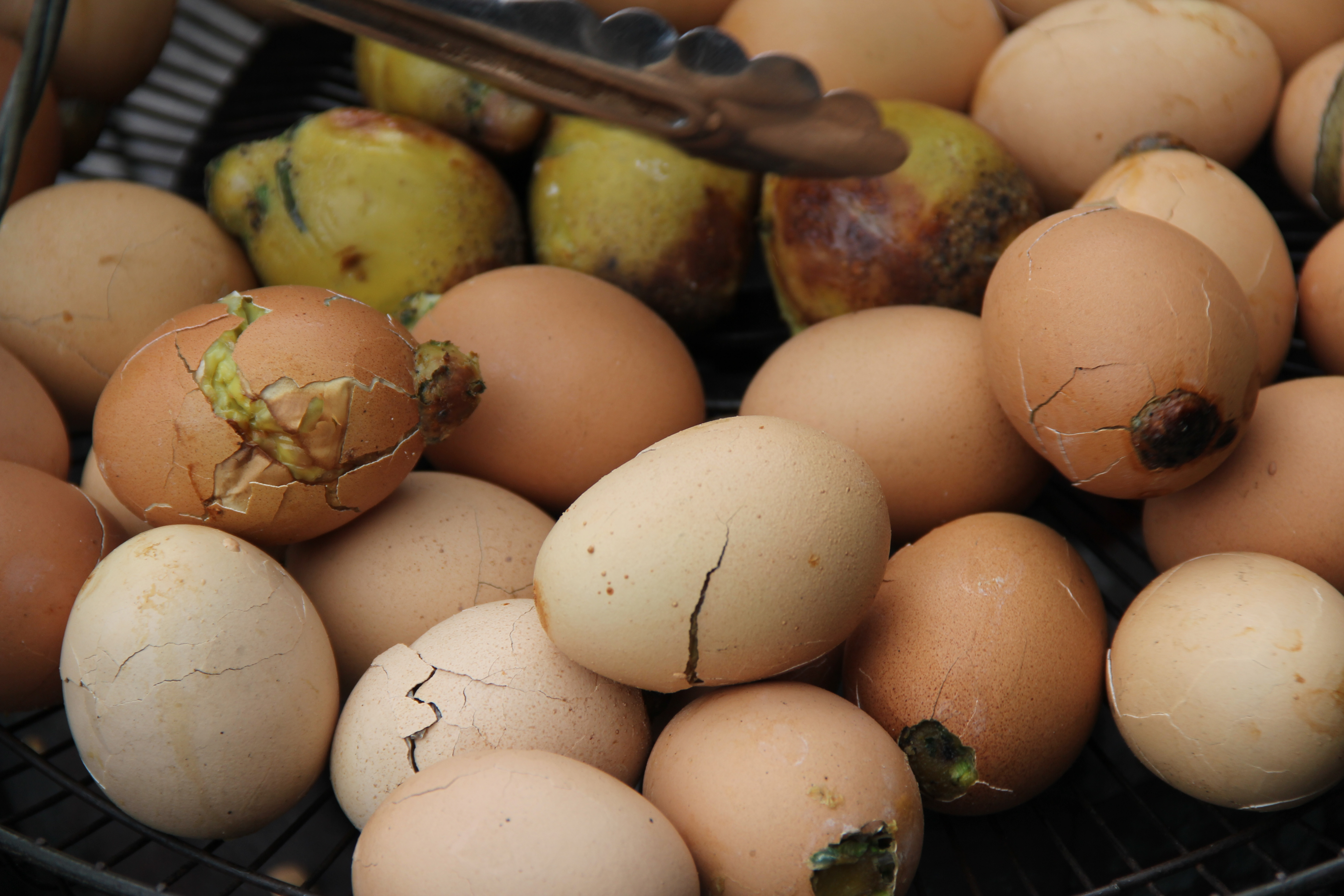
Balut in partially broken shells.

Traditionally, the fertilized eggs are incubated in the sun or buried in sand and stored in baskets to retain warmth. In order for the embryo to develop normally, it must be exposed to heat for the correct period of time while ensuring that the temperature is not too hot to harm the eggs or too cold to permit growth. The embryo is extremely sensitive to high temperatures and is easily killed upon cooking in the sun. Within the first few stages of maturation, balut is known as "balut sa puti" ("wrapped in white") when it is white; the embryo inside is insufficiently developed to show a beak, feathers, or claws, and the bones are undeveloped. These are made from very specific egg types, less than five days old and with no visible surface cracks.

The duration of egg incubation is a matter of local preference. In the Philippines, balut is generally incubated for 14 to 18 days before being boiled for consumption. At about 14 to 16 days of incubation, the embryo floats on top of the egg white and yolk, and the balut is called "mamatong". For most balut makers, the ideal incubation is said to be 17 days old.

There are other versions of balut. In the Cambodian version, pong tea khon, the egg is incubated for 18 to 20 days. In the Vietnamese version, trứng vịt lộn, the egg is incubated for 19 to 21 days, when the embryo is old enough to be recognizable as a baby duck and has bones that will be firm but tender when cooked. Some men prefer to eat an embryo that is much more developed, "...so that it looks gross, because that is a way to prove your manhood."

== Chemistry of cooking ==
During this cooking process, changes occur in the food chemistry of balut, such as the sol dispersion of water molecules within the embryonic fluid. This liquid becomes the broth for the solid which are parts of the duck within the egg. After cooking, it can be considered a protein gel, depending on the length of time it was cooked. Heating high-protein food such as balut can cause the chemical changes to take place and fully or partially denature proteins, causing the surface to become thick and causing an irreversible gel protein to form.

Temperature has a significant impact on the final taste and texture of the cooked balut. Warm temperatures of 29–30 °C (84–86 °F) change the taste and texture of the yolk by making it more grainy. This can be attributed to the changes in proteins, and their partial denaturation, during the heating and incubation process. When boiling or cooking eggs, the white of the egg tends to solidify because the proteins are denatured in an irreversible reaction and turn from transparent to an opaque white. Physical and chemical changes in the final balut product can also be attributed to microbial infections and the rate that microbes infect the balut at various stages.

There are many chemical changes that occur inside the duck egg as it is being processed, which can vary depending on how or what it is cooked with. While boiling, added salt can contribute to a number of chemical changes; it seems to increase the proportional weight of egg white within the shell, which can be due to the weight differences between the embryo and the egg white itself. Added salt can also increase the hardness of the egg yolk and affect the overall texture of the final balut product. Other chemical changes observed in nutrient content of the duck egg as it is processed are a slight decrease in the amount of available amino acids, water-soluble vitamins, and minerals after the processing is complete.

== Nutrition ==
There are different nutritional values for balut, since it can be either fertilized chicken or duck eggs. Balut nutrition specifications between chicken and duck have minor differences, but both eggs have around 14 grams of crude protein, 188 calories each, and around 100 milligrams of calcium. A duck egg might have a higher value of nutrition than a chicken egg, but overall, both chicken and duck balut have approximately the same nutritional value.

In folk medicine, according to popular Vietnamese belief, these eggs are a nutritious and restorative food for pregnant or delivering women.

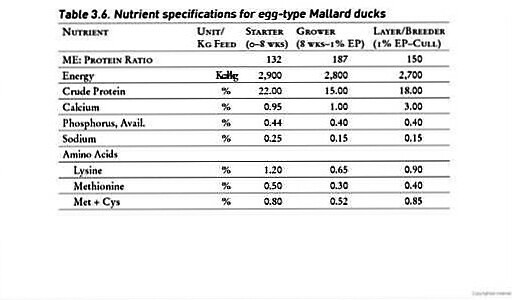
Balut eggs

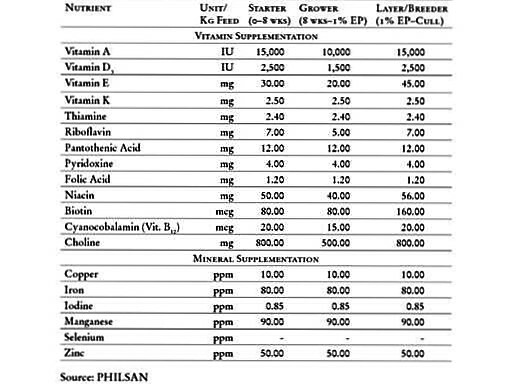
Nutrition specifications for egg-type duck (balut)

== Dishes and vending ==
Balut eggs are savored for their balance of textures and flavors. The broth surrounding the embryo is often sipped from the egg before the shell is peeled, then the yolk and young chick inside can be eaten. All of the contents of the egg may be consumed, although the white albumen may remain uneaten, depending on the age of the fertilized egg. This white albumen may have an unappetizing cartilaginous taste and is tough and rubbery in texture.

In the Philippines, balut has recently entered haute cuisine by being served as appetizers in restaurants, cooked adobo style, fried in omelettes, or even used as filling in baked pastries. In Vietnam, balut is eaten with a pinch of pepper salt with lime/kumquat or ginger and rau răm (also known as laksa leaf). The dish "trứng vịt lộn" can be served as boiled balut or grilled balut. In Cambodia, balut is eaten while still warm in the shell and served with nothing more than a little garnish, which is usually a mixture of lime juice and ground pepper.

A similar preparation is known in China as maodan (Chinese: 毛蛋; pinyin: máo dàn; lit. 'feathered egg'), modan (Chinese: 末蛋; pinyin: mò dàn; lit. 'end-stage egg'), wangjidan (Chinese: 旺雞蛋; pinyin: wàng jīdàn; lit. 'flush egg'), or huozhuzi (Chinese: 活珠子; pinyin: huózhūzi; lit. 'living bead'). Chinese traders and migrants are said to have brought the idea of eating fertilized duck eggs to the Philippines; however, the knowledge and craft of balut-making has been localized by the balut-makers (magbabalut). Today, balut production has not been mechanized in favor of the traditional production by hand.

Many vendors sell cooked balut from buckets of sand (used to retain warmth) accompanied by small packets of salt. Uncooked balut are rarely sold in Southeast Asia. In the United States, Asian markets occasionally carry uncooked balut eggs. Alternatively, they can be ordered by mail. The cooking process is identical to that of hard-boiled chicken eggs, and baluts are eaten while still warm.

Duck eggs that are not properly developed after nine to twelve days are sold as penoy, which look, smell, and taste similar to a regular hard-boiled egg. In Filipino cuisine, these are occasionally beaten and fried, similar to scrambled eggs, and served with a vinegar dip.

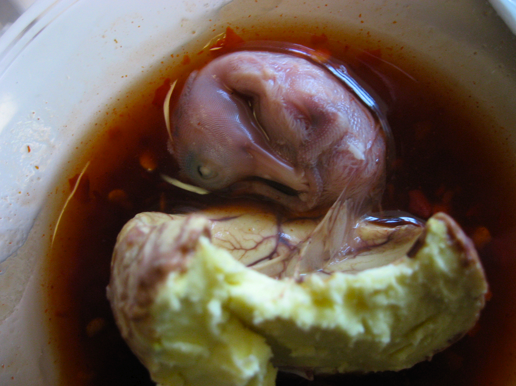
Fifteen-day-old balut egg dipped in a mixture of hot sauce and vinegar

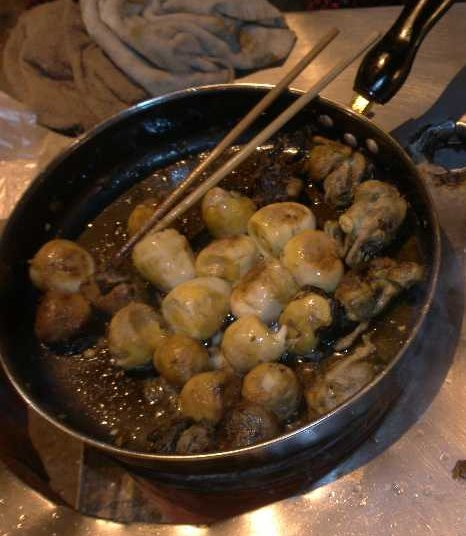
Shelled and fried balut

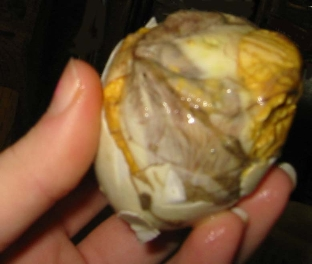
Balut

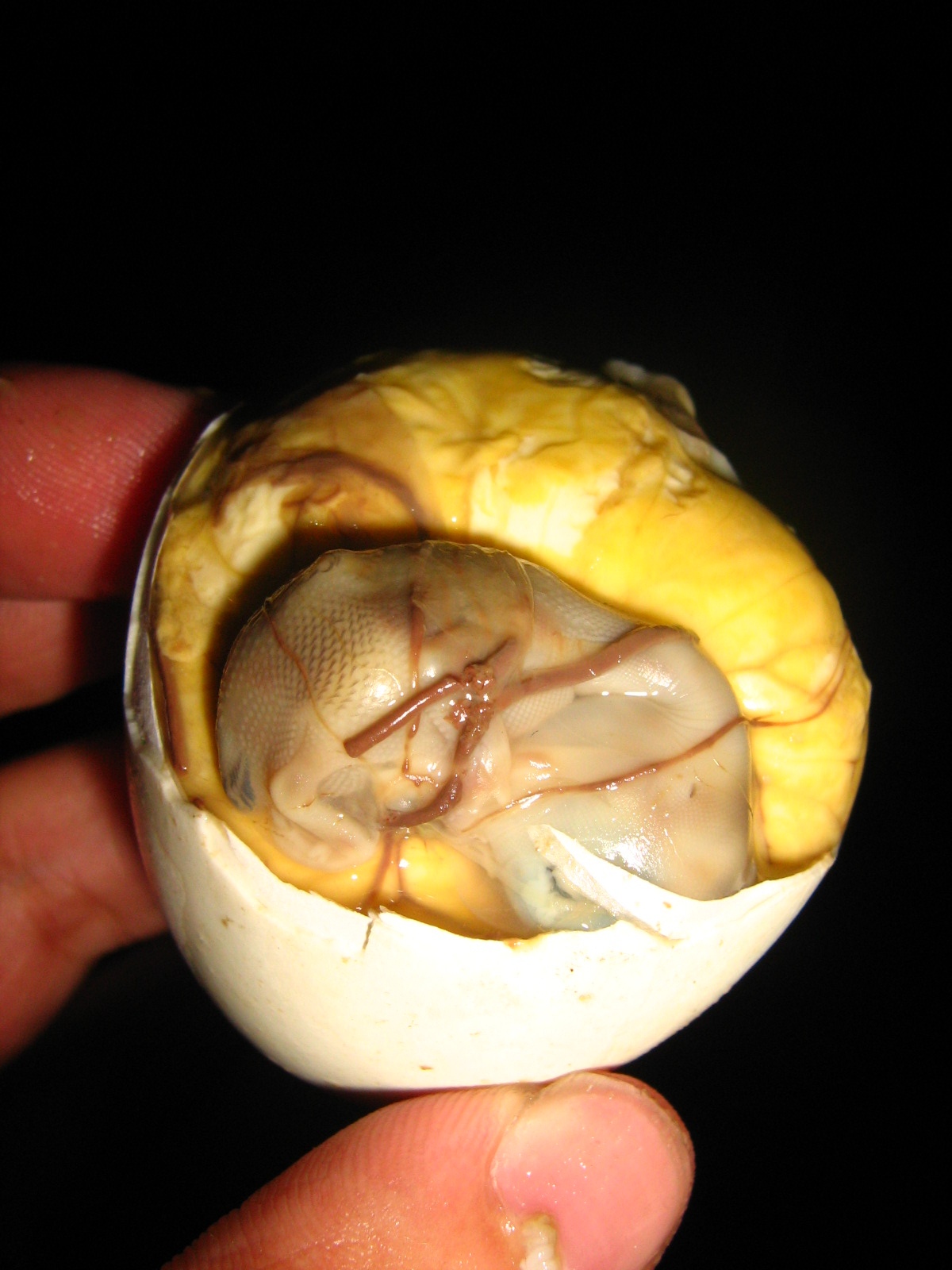
Underaged balut with visible chick

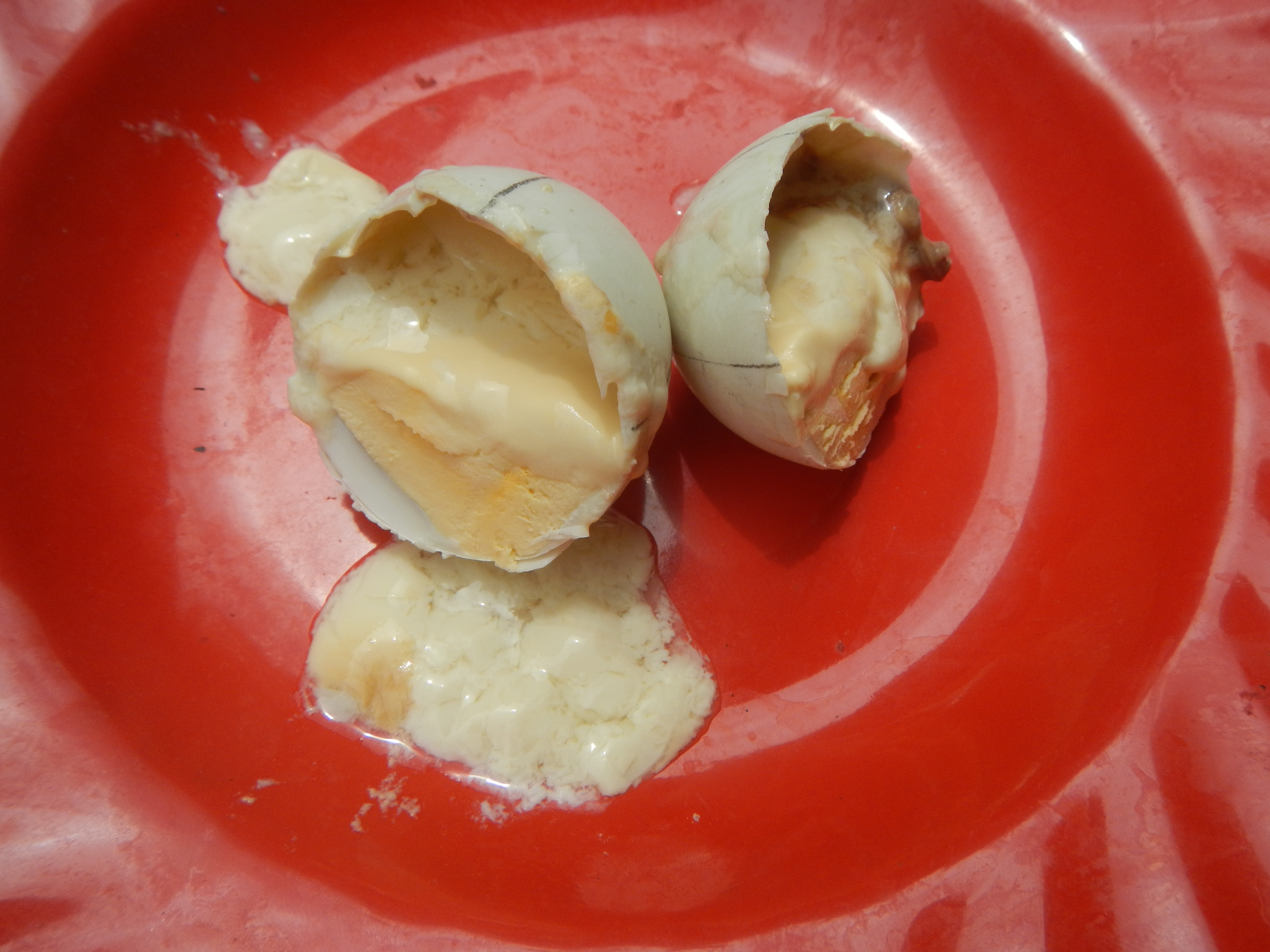
Penoy

== Consumption and uses ==
=== Locations of consumption ===
Balut is consumed in high amounts within countries in Southeast Asia, including Laos, Cambodia, Vietnam, Thailand, and the Philippines. Pateros is a first-class and sole municipality in Metro Manila, Philippines, that is famous for its duck-raising industry and balut production. The Pateros municipality was actually named for its duck farmers by speakers of Spanish.

Balut is recognized as a national food of the Philippines. It is commonly sold as a street food and served as an appetizer in restaurants. The taste of balut is similar to chicken soup, and it has an unusual texture.

Balut is found in some countries and locations of North America. While it cannot be found in every store in North America, specialty stores such as T&T — and, in particular, Filipino stores in the Greater Vancouver area — often sell balut. In the United States, growers such as Metzer Farms specialize in balut production, spreading the knowledge of balut and its awareness.

One reason it may not be found or consumed as frequently in North America is that the majority of people outside of Southeast Asia still recognize balut as a novel and taboo food and are often anxious about trying it.

=== Consumption ===
In the Philippines, balut is often eaten with salt or a chili, garlic, and vinegar (white or coconut sap) mixture to season, depending on personal preference. Balut can be served in many ways and may be cooked, boiled, or fried. It may be cooked adobo style, fried in omelets, or used as filling in pastries. Although balut is globally recognized as a Filipino food, it is being consumed less and less in the Philippines. This is partly due to increasingly Western tastes, but also because balut is often associated with poverty.

Some countries and locations will serve balut raw, although this is not a common practice. "Raw", in this sense, could mean the balut was lightly boiled or cooked very briefly. This is potentially dangerous, since it increases the risk of spoiling and of ingesting harmful microorganisms.

In Vietnam, balut (trứng vịt lộn, hột vịt lộn) can be found in the majority of breakfast restaurants selling noodles (often as a side dish) and night street vendors. It is boiled and then served in small bowls with salt, chili, pepper and ginger.

== Incubation and storage ==
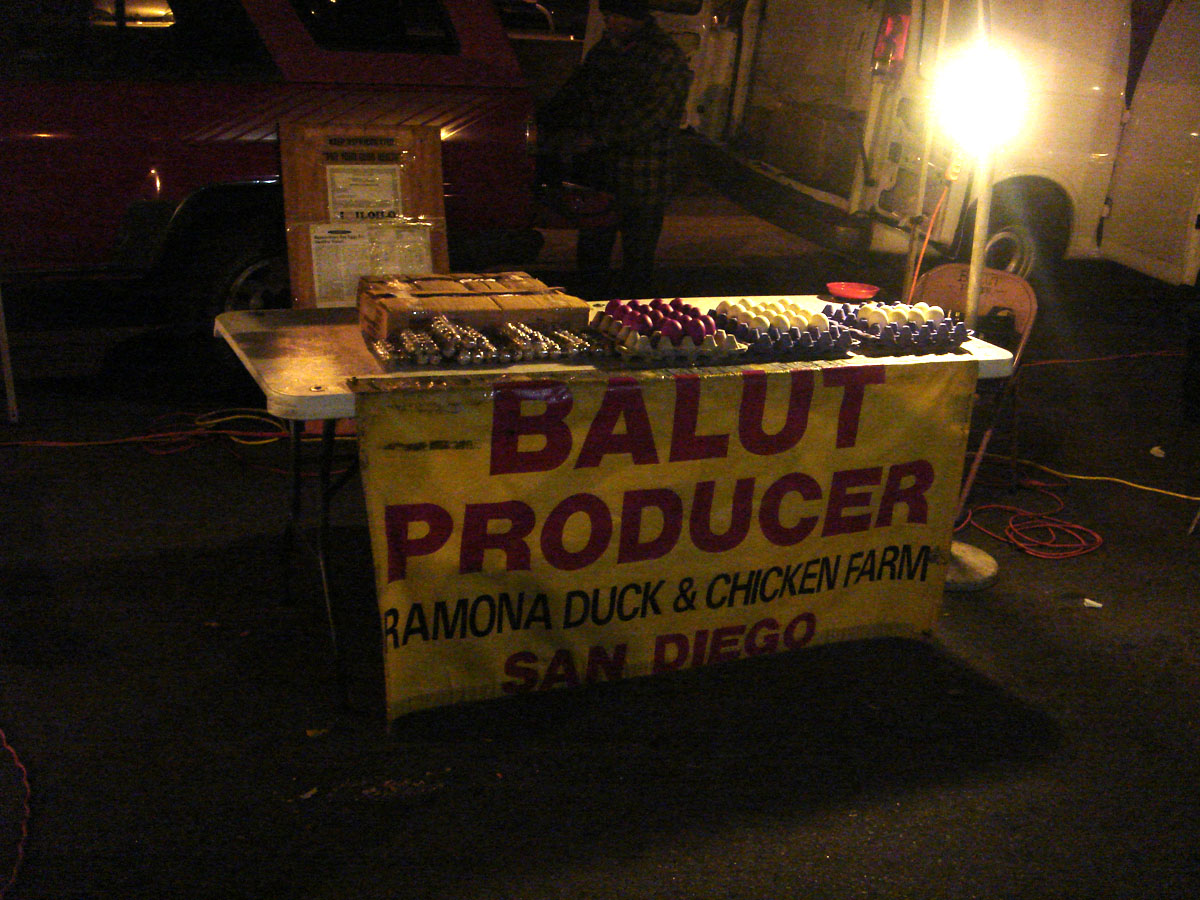
Balut stall.

Balut is considered to be a street food, and like many other street foods, it is best consumed as soon as it is prepared and served. Sources suggest that at most, the shelf life of a cooked balut is one day, but it can last up to a week in the refrigerator.

According to the FDA Food Code, balut can perish over time or due to temperature changes. After being cooked, balut should be handled either at 57 °C (135 °F) and above or kept at or below 5 °C (41 °F).

While most countries have specific regulations and standards for food, Canada has certain egg regulations pertaining to what products can be labelled as an egg. Balut eggs are not subjected to the egg regulations in Canada under the Canadian Food Inspection Agency, meaning they do not require the specific labeling requirements and rules of the traditional chicken egg.

== Religious prohibitions ==
Eating balut is forbidden for some religious groups. Both Judaism and Islam have strict prohibitions on consuming food that is prepared in manners incompatible with religiously prescribed dietary laws. In Judaism, the embryo of a chick inside an egg of a bird, even a kosher bird, is forbidden for consumption. The Quran forbids consumption of meat if the animal has not been slaughtered properly, making the animal or animal-product "maytah". Because balut is an egg containing a partially developed embryo, this makes it "haram."

== Animal welfare concerns ==
Information relating to whether boiling a partially developed embryo is ethically acceptable or not can be found in the legislation relating to the euthanasia and treatment of research animals. Bird embryos that have reached greater than 50% of their incubation have developed a neural tube sufficient for pain perception; therefore, they should be euthanized by similar methods used in avian neonates, such as anesthetic overdose, decapitation, or prolonged exposure to carbon dioxide. Similarly, in the UK, embryonic birds are "protected animals" once they have reached the last third of their incubation period. There are specified methods of humanely killing protected animals used in research, but boiling is not one of these. Depending on the species of duck, some eggs used for balut would be boiled within the last half or third of embryo development. Duck embryos are often taken off incubation in order to stunt the growth process; the embryos no longer develop and become readily available for purchasing. The RSPCA Australia recommends against boiling the duck embryo from the 18th day of incubation onwards due to the potential for suffering beyond that point, and notes that it is "an area that is yet to be further researched".

Several groups wish to ban balut. A petition has been raised to get 5,000 signatures to have balut labeled "fertilized duck egg with embryo" and taken off the menu in the Maharlika restaurant, New York. As of 2014, the restaurant was selling balut for $5 each. As a response to this petition, Filipino New Yorkers have created a counterpetition, asking to leave the food item alone.

== Health ==
The incubation temperatures and environment required for the proper development of balut during processing are ideal growth conditions for many bacteria, including Salmonella enteritidis. In addition, faecal pathogens can be deposited on the eggshell surface during laying. Balut is therefore labelled as a "Hazardous Food" in Canada. Warnings have been published to obtain balut only from safe, well-known producers.

== Outside Southeast Asia ==
Outside of Southeast Asia, balut has been featured on reality television shows, such as in season one of Bizarre Foods with Andrew Zimmern, or as part of eating challenges, such as on Fear Factor in 2002, Hell's Kitchen in 2013, The Amazing Race Asia 2, The Amazing Race Australia 2, The Amazing Race Ukraine, Survivor: Palau, Survivor: China, Survivor: Caramoan, and Survivor: Cambodia.

In the United States, eggs are sold at Asian markets. However, to get the right age eggs and to ensure freshness, it is recommended that they be purchased from a professional or an egg vendor at Asian farmers markets.

== Guinness World Record ==
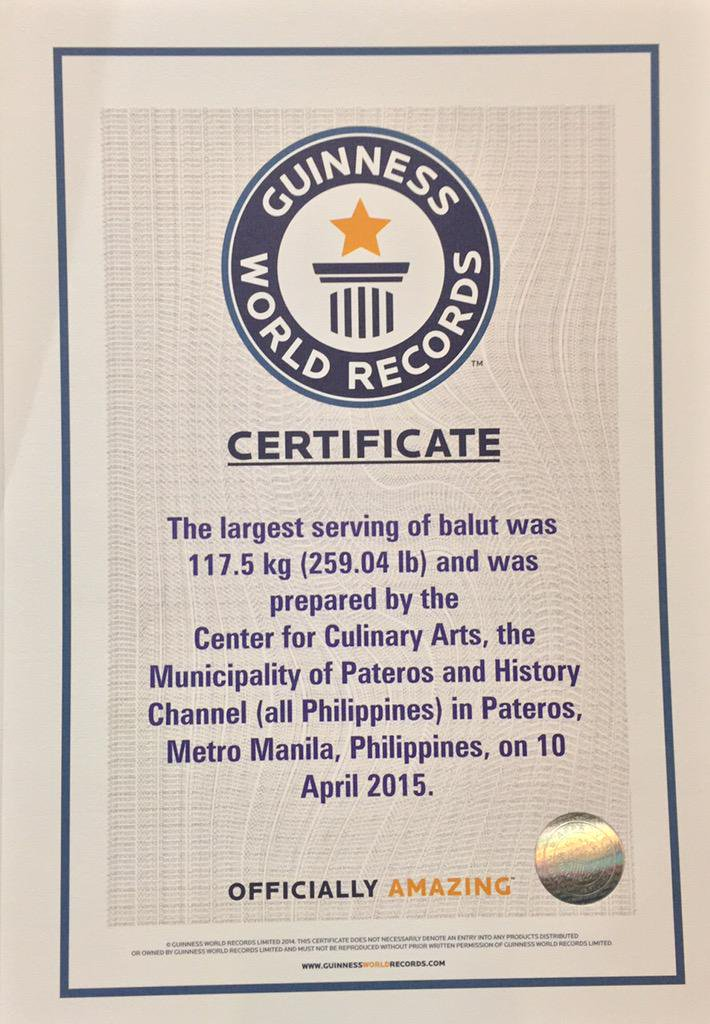
Certificate for the record

On April 10, 2015, former Pateros mayor Jaime C. Medina collaborated with the Center for Culinary Arts (CCA, Manila) and the History Channel to attempt to set the record for the world's largest serving of balut in Pateros, Metro Manila. The CCA chefs, headed by Tristan Encarnacion, prepared 1,000 pieces of balut into an adobo dish that was recorded to have weighed 117.5 kilograms. The resulting dish was enjoyed by the townsfolk in a symbolic boodle fight, with tables topped with banana leaves stretching along B. Morcilla Street.

== In popular culture ==
The 2024 horror video game Hapunan has the player taking on the role of Niko, a poor Filipino student who sells balut in Barangay Sak Dudol, where a gang of contract killers is suspected of committing brutal murders during the night.

== See also ==
- Balut (game) – Dice game
- Century egg – Chinese preserved egg
- Isaw – Filipino grilled skewers
- Kutti pi – Anglo-Indian dish made of goat fetus
- Laurices – Rabbit fetus eaten as a meat dish
- Kwek-Kwek – Filipino street food
- List of delicacies – Food item considered highly desirable in certain cultures
- Salted duck egg – Traditional Asian dish common in several regions
- Smoked egg – Food that involves the smoking of eggs
- Soy egg – Egg dishes
- Tea egg – Egg boiled in tea as a savory snack
