= Animal husbandry in Himachal Pradesh =

Animal husbandry in Himachal Pradesh plays a very major role in the development of agricultural sector of Himachal. Indigenous breeds of cows, buffalo and sheep are of very poor quality.
Numerous schemes for cattle development, cattle health and disease resistance in wood production, poultry development, feed and fodder development, dairy improvement, milk supply schemes and veterinary education has been undertaken in order to improve the livestock in the state. There are many veterinary hospitals, dispensaries and outlying dispensaries in the state to provide veterinary aids and to take measures against various contagious diseases. A number of mobile dispensaries are also in operation.
Recently, Angora rabbits imported from West Germany were introduced in the state. Now 7 units for their propagation have been set up in Kangra.
Milk production has also increased. Milk chilling plants with a capacity of about 55,000 liters have been set up at about 24 places and departmental milk supply schemes are operational in 6 towns.

Two Baby Goats in upper region of Himachal Pradesh

== Recent Developments ==
In 2025, the Himachal Pradesh government announced the Pashu Mitra Recruitment 2025 initiative, aimed at strengthening veterinary and animal husbandry services across the state. The recruitment drive seeks to engage trained personnel as Pashu Mitras (animal friends) to assist in livestock care, vaccination, artificial insemination, and disease prevention at the village level. The initiative is expected to improve rural livestock health services, reduce mortality in cattle, and promote dairy productivity in Himachal Pradesh.
