= Angora rabbit =

Family of rabbit breeds

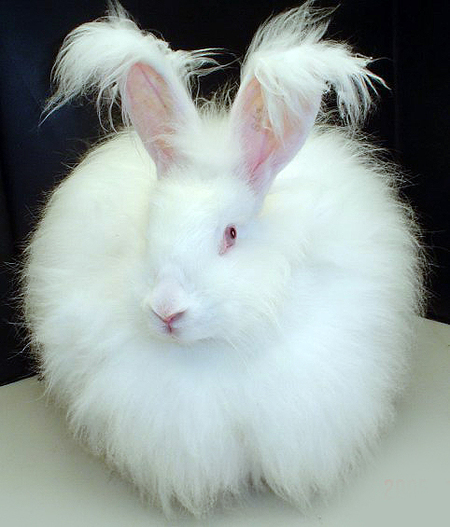
- Country of origin: Turkey
- Distribution: Worldwide
- Type: English, French, German, Giant, Satin, Chinese, Finnish, Japanese, Korean, Russian, St. Lucian, Swiss
- Use: Angora wool production, pet

Traits
- Weight: 2.0–5.5 kg (4.4–12.1 lb)
- Coat: Long, Fine
- Wool color: White or Colored; Natural or Dyed
- Color: Albino ("Ruby-eyed White") or Colored
- Litter size: 2–12
- Lifespan: 7–12 years

Notes
- Coat requires daily grooming

The Angora rabbit (Turkish: Ankara tavşanı) is one of the oldest groups of domestic rabbit breeds, which is bred for the long fibers of its coat, known as Angora wool. They are gathered by shearing, combing or plucking. There are at least 11 distinct breeds of Angora rabbit, four of which are currently recognized by the American Rabbit Breeders Association (ARBA): the English Angora, the French Angora, the Giant Angora and the Satin Angora. Other unrecognized breeds include the German Angora, the Finnish Angora, the Chinese Angora, the Japanese Angora, the Korean Angora, the Russian Angora, the St Lucian Angora and the Swiss Angora.

== History ==
The Angora is said to have originated in Ankara (historically known as Angora), in present-day Turkey, and is known to have been brought to France in 1723. The Angora rabbit became a popular pet of the French royalty in the mid-18th century, and Angoras had spread to other parts of Europe by the end of that century. In the United States, garments made of Angora-rabbit wool have been popular ever since they first arrived in the early 20th century. However, only during World War II did domestic production expand to meet the demand for more than 54,000 kg (120,000 lb) a year. This valuable, soft, silky, fiber aroused much interest, and quickly people became enamored with the production process.

== Angora-rabbit wool ==
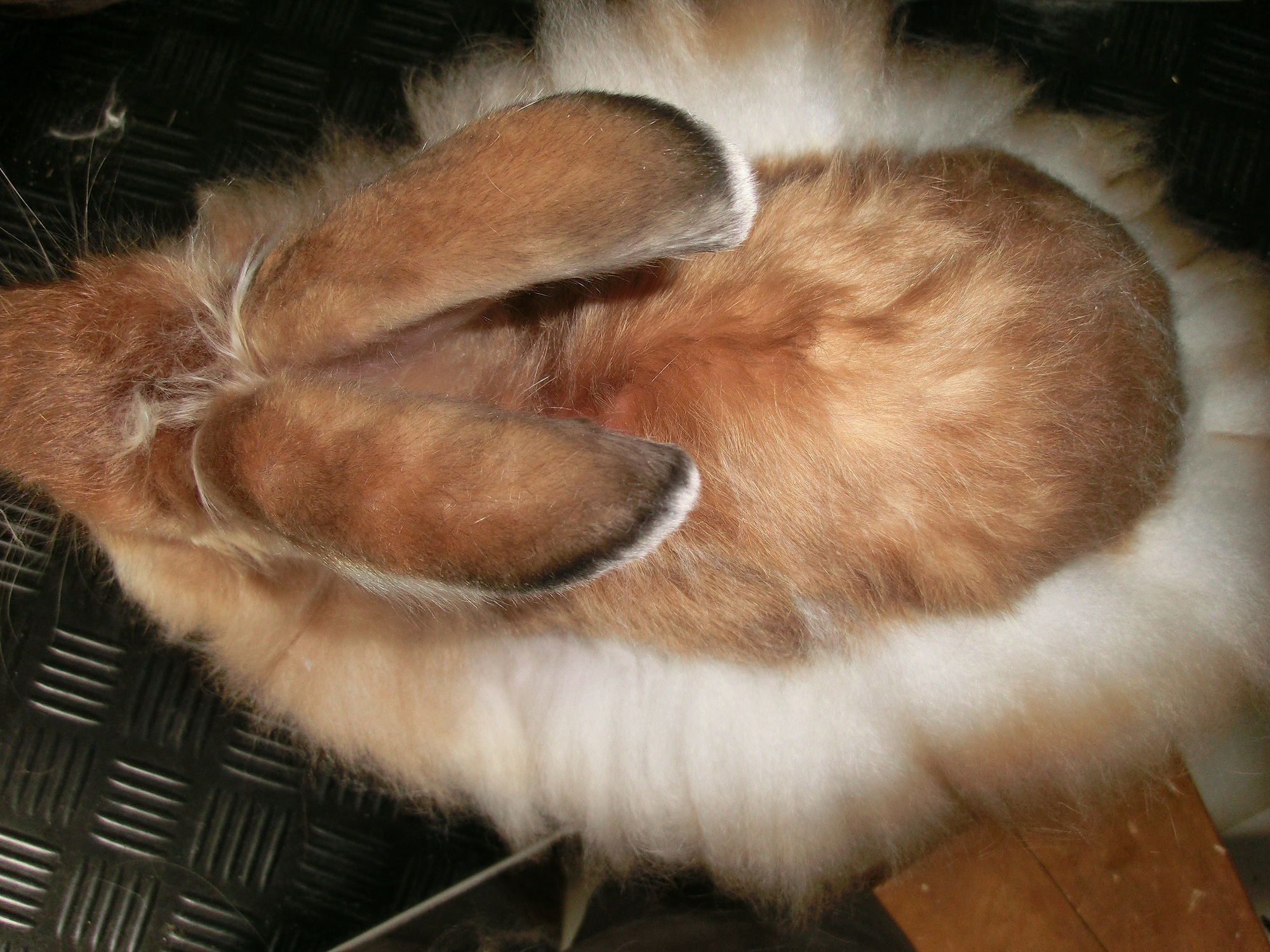
A plucked Satin Angora rabbit

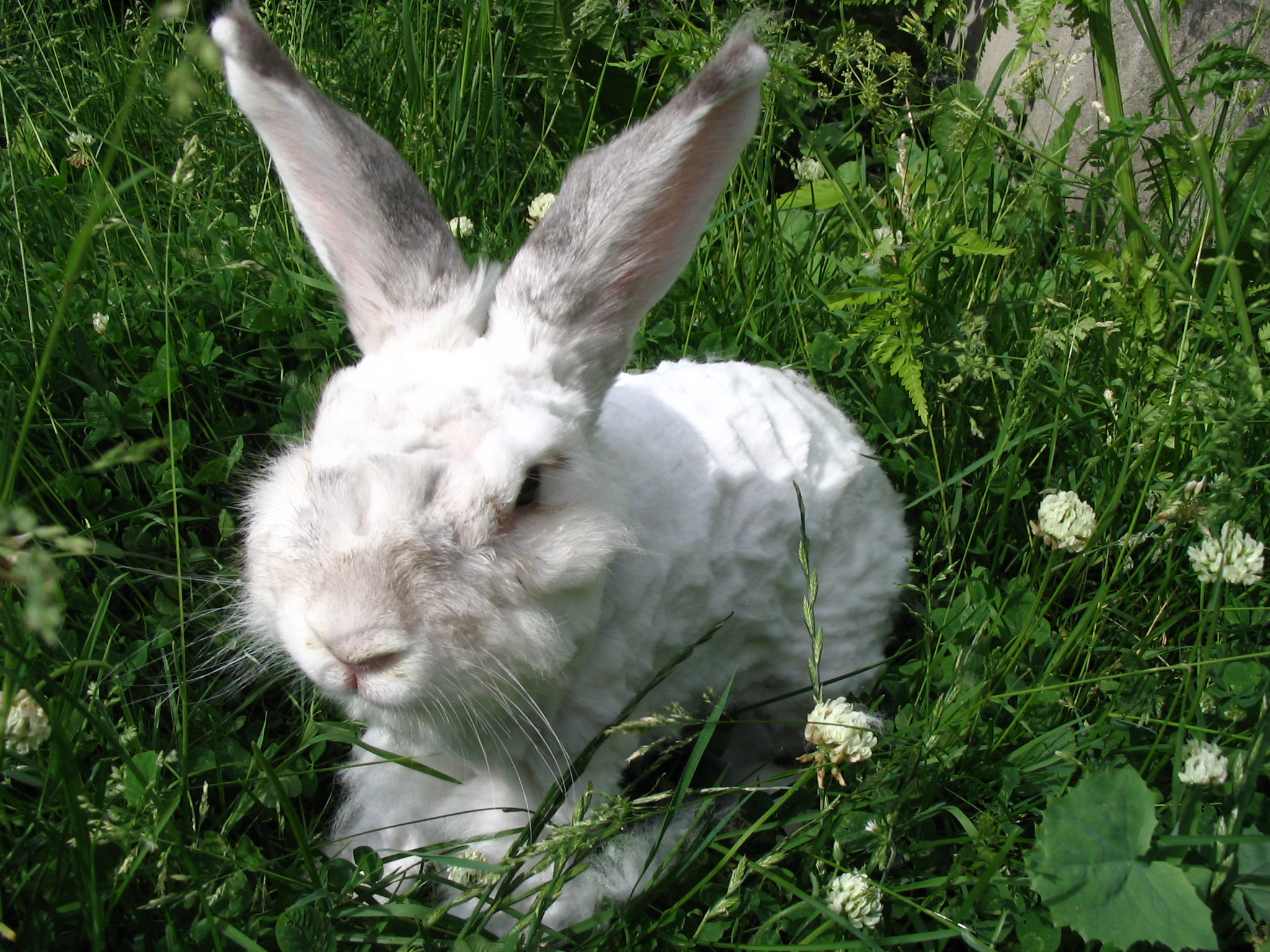
A shorn Angora rabbit

Angoras are bred mainly for their wool, which is silky and soft. At only 14–16 micrometres in diameter, it is similar to cashmere in fineness and softness to the touch. A healthy adult Angora's wool will grow approximately 3 cm (1 in) per month. Regular grooming is necessary to prevent the fibre from matting and felting on the rabbit, which causes discomfort and can lead to pain and even infection. Angora wool is harvested (plucked or shorn) every three to four months throughout the year. The coat needs to be monitored after 6 months of regrowth since it may tend to "die" and easily mat.

Angora wool may be gathered periodically by hand-plucking the hair within the coat that are being naturally shed. Full harvesting is done by shearing the coat with clippers or small scissors, often while the rabbit sits atop a groomer's turntable. Shearing typically starts at the head, moving across the shoulders to the tail. The rabbit is then flipped and the underside is shorn from tail to chin. Between 340 and 510 g (12 and 18 oz) of wool may be harvested from a Giant Angora.

Because rabbits do not possess the same allergy-causing qualities as many other animals, their wool is an important alternative.

== Health ==
=== Wool block ===
Because of the length and abundance of their hair, Angora rabbits are particularly susceptible to wool block, a potentially lethal blockage of the digestive tract. All rabbits ingest some of their wool when they groom themselves, but their digestive system is sometimes not able to pass that foreign matter. The length of Angora hair compounds the risk of impaction, which can lead to death. Clipping or plucking an Angora's wool every 90–120 days is necessary to prevent wool block.

=== Wool mites ===
Cheyletiella parasitovorax is a skin parasite commonly found in Angora rabbits. Signs of infestation are flaky skin patches and fur loss. Wool mites reduce fiber yields and the resulting skin flakes are detrimental to the fiber quality. Wool mites may be treated with ivermectin or with carbaryl powder.

== Angora rabbit breeds ==
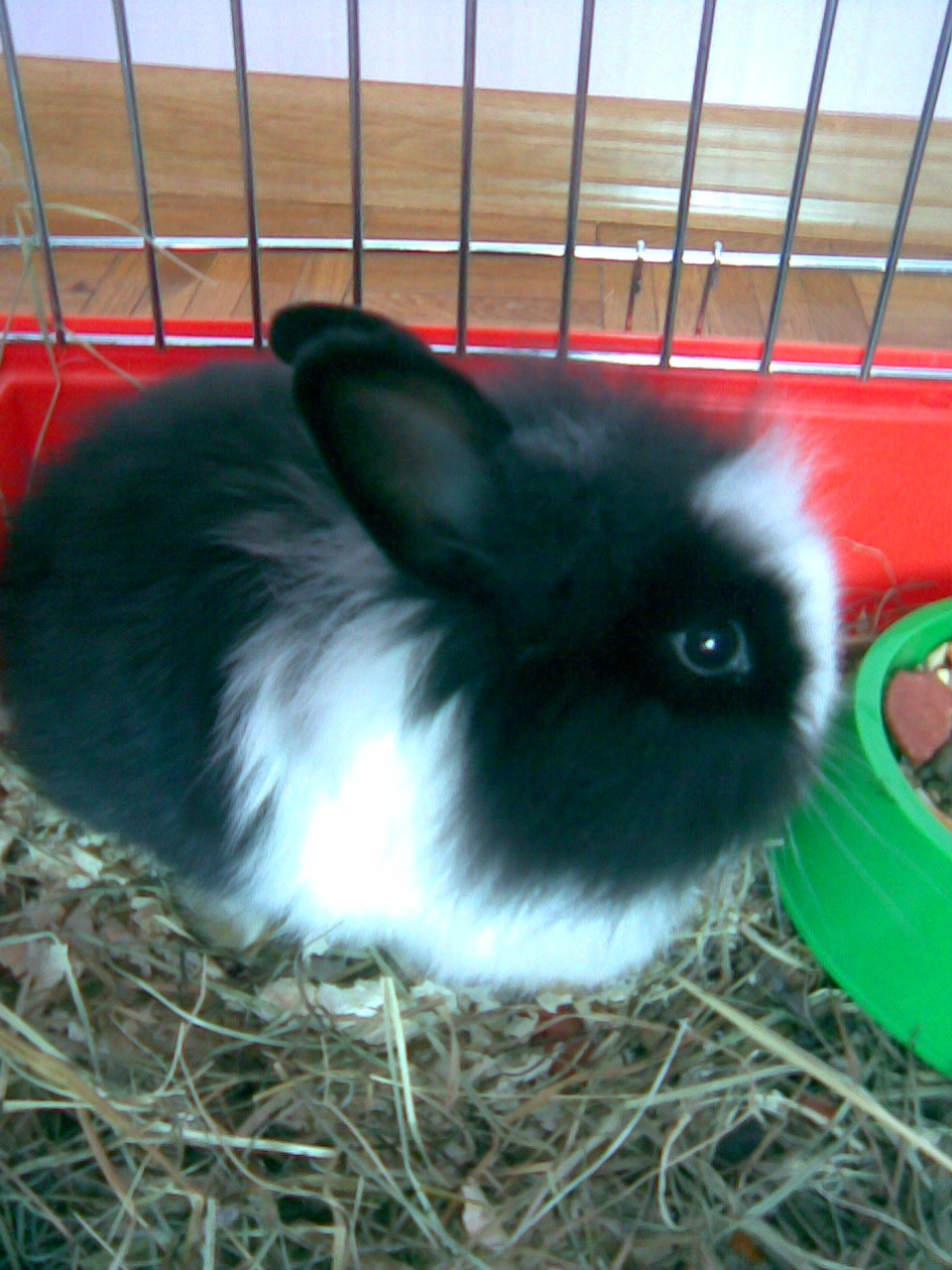
A dwarf Angora rabbit with the "Angora gene"

The iconic long coat of the Angora is the result of a rabbit gene referred to as l (lowercase "L"). This "Angora gene" is present in all Angora breeds. It has also sometimes been utilized in the development of other rabbit breeds or other breeds' new varieties. "Dwarf Wooly" breeds including American Fuzzy Lop, Lionhead and Jersey Wooly are now recognized in the U.S. by ARBA. Belgium and France have their own Dwarf Wooly breeds. There is also a rare Mini English Angora breed in New Zealand.

=== English Angora ===
- Weight: 2.0–3.5 kg (4.4–7.7 lb)
- ARBA-recognized varieties: Agouti, Broken, Pointed White, Ruby-eyed White, Self, and Shaded

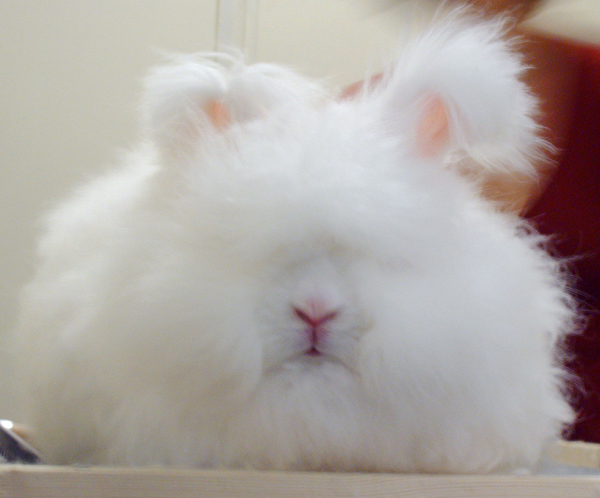
English Angora Ruby-eyed white doe

Before 1939 there was one breed of "Angora Wooler". In 1939 ARBA reclassified 'Angora Wooler' as English Type and French Type. In 1944 ARBA officially separated Angora rabbits into two breeds: English Angora and French Angora.

Rabbits of the English Angora breed are adorned with "fur", growths of wool on the ears and the entire face except above the nose, and front feet, along with their thick body, and wool. They are gentle in nature, but they are not recommended for those who do not groom their animals. Their wool is very dense and needs to be groomed twice a week.

This is the smallest Angora rabbit of the four ARBA-recognized breeds. This breed is more common as a pet because of the facial features that give it a puppy or teddy-bear look. If the texture of the wool is correct, the maintenance is relatively easy; however, if the texture of the rabbit is cottony, it requires a great deal of maintenance. Beginning spinners may find the wool challenging.

The English Angora can be bred to have broken colors—i.e., white with black spots—but this is not accepted by ARBA standards and would lead to a disqualification when showing the rabbit. The toenails should also be only one color, but the ears could be folded over at the tips, and the furnishings on the face may cover their eyes. Notably, the English Angora is the only one of the Angora breeds that has hair covering its eyes.

=== French Angora ===
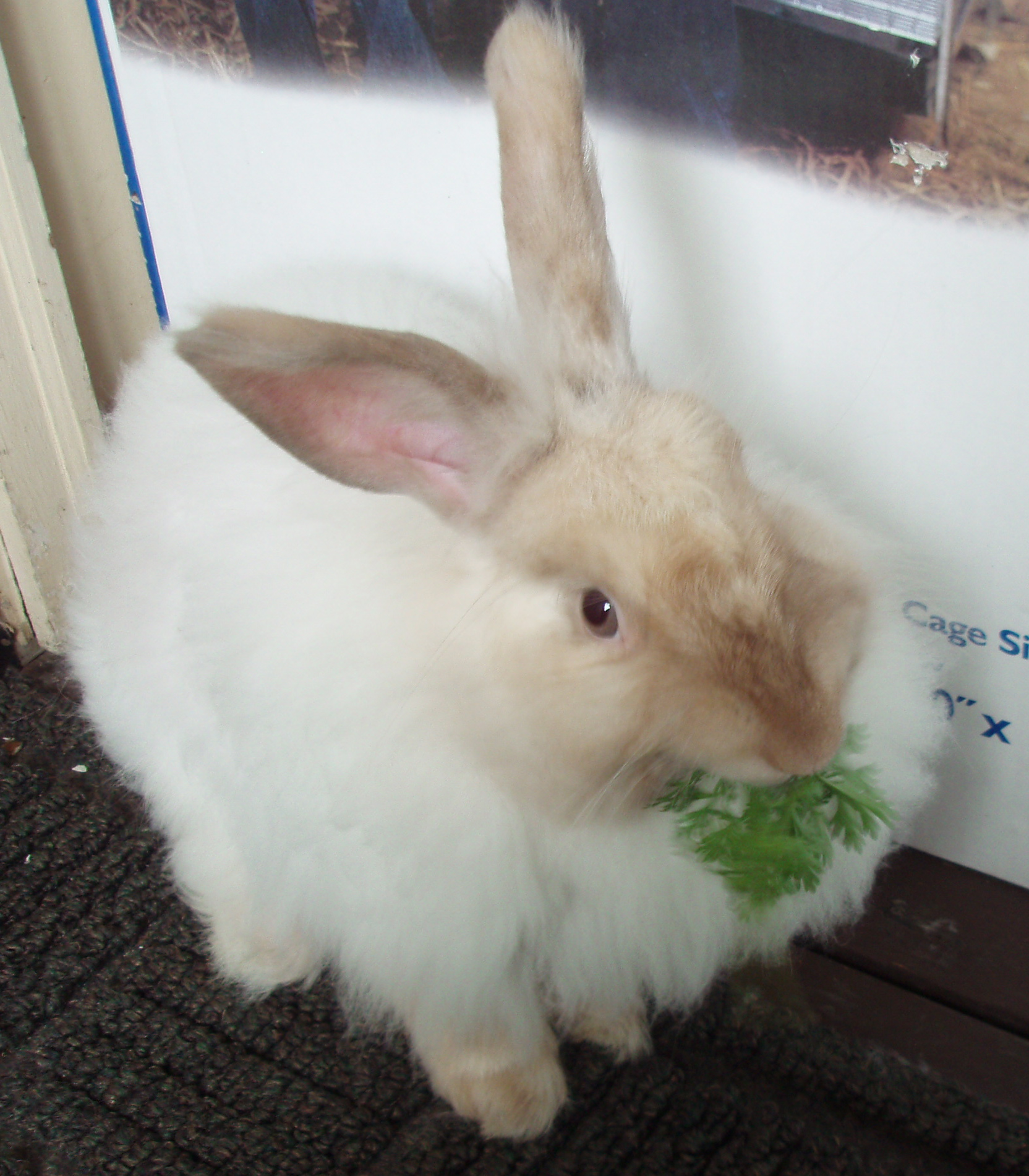
French Angora Chocolate Pearl

- Weight: 3.5–4.5 kg (7.7–9.9 lb)
- ARBA-recognized varieties: Agouti, Broken, Pointed White, Self, Shaded, Ticked, and Wide Band

This breed has a dense undercoat. If the texture is correct it requires less maintenance than other Angora breeds. Small ear tufts are allowed but not usually preferred by breeders. ARBA recognizes the same colors as with English Angora, but with the addition of ticked and wide band. They are shown at ARBA shows using the types 'white' and 'colored' (broken being a colored). As with other ARBA-shown rabbits, toenails should also be only one color.

The French Angora is one of the large Angora breeds at 3.4–4.8 kilograms (7.5–10.5 lb), with a commercial body type. It differs from the English, Giant and German Angora in that it possesses a clean (hairless) face and front feet with only minor tufting on the rear legs. The color of a French Angora is determined by the color of its head, feet and tail (all the same color). This variety of angora fibre has smooth silky texture. Beginning spinners may find Angora wool a challenge. Desirable characteristics of the fibre include its texture, warmth, light weight and pure white color. It is used for sweaters, mittens, baby clothes and millinery.

=== German Angora ===
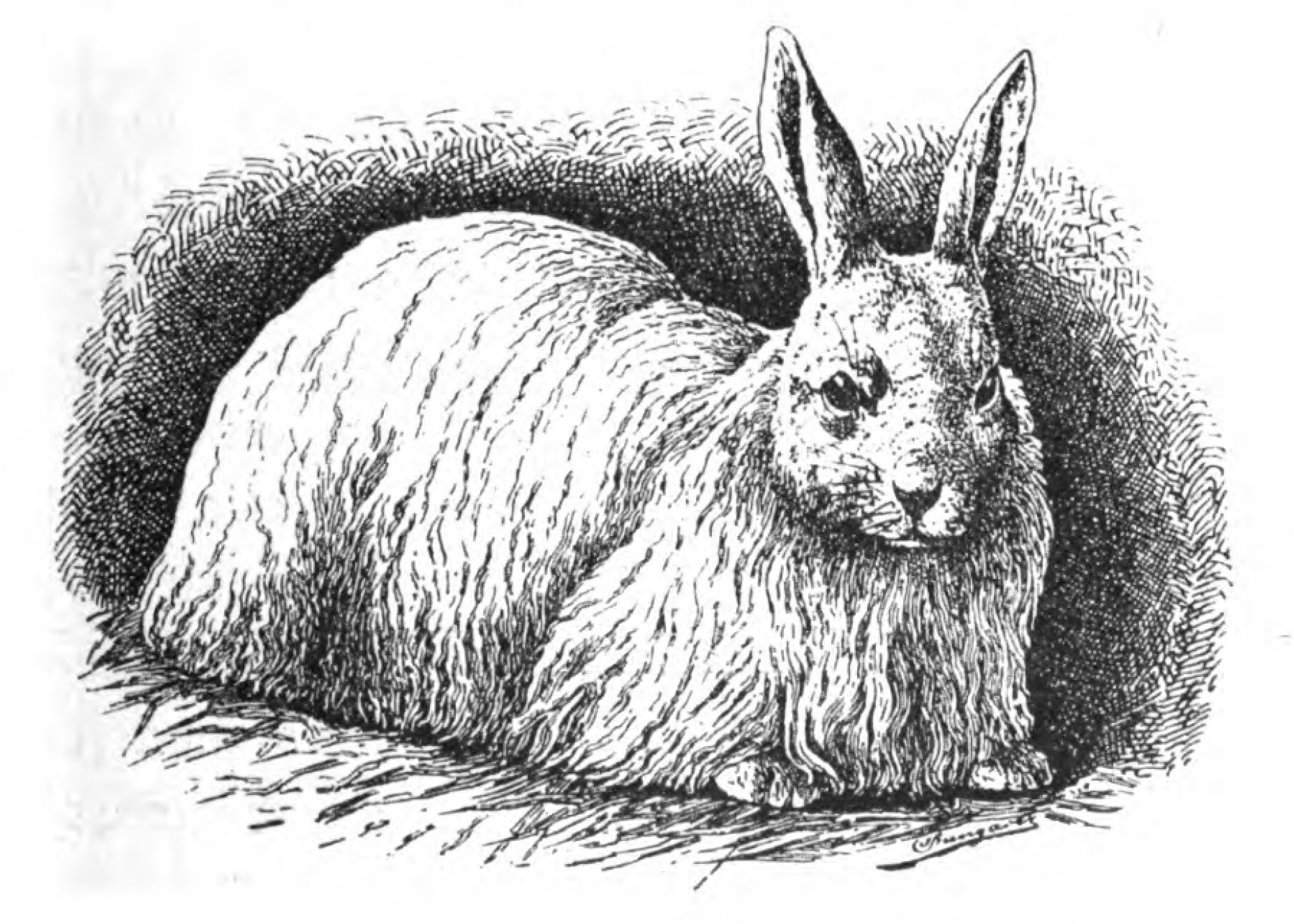
Angora Rabbit Angora-Kaninchen (Jean Bungartz 1902)

- Weight: 2.5–5.5 kg (5.5–12.1 lb)
- IAGARB-accepted varieties: Albino or Colored (but not bi-colored)
- Albino Color Group
  - Albino
- Self Group
  - Black
  - Dilute Black^{a/k/a Blue}
  - Brown^{a/k/a Chocolate}
  - Dilute Brown^{a/k/a Lilac}
- Tortoiseshell Group
  - Tortoiseshell
  - Dilute Black Tortoiseshell^{a/k/a Blue Tortoiseshell}
  - Brown Tortoiseshell^{a/k/a Chocolate Tortoiseshell}
  - Dilute Brown Tortoiseshell^{a/k/a Lilac Tortoiseshell}
- Agouti Group
  - Agouti^{a/k/a Black Agouti, Chestnut Agouti, Wild Agouti}
  - Dilute Black Agouti^{a/k/a Blue Agouti or Opal}
  - Brown Agouti^{a/k/a Chocolate Agouti}
  - Dilute Brown Agouti^{a/k/a Lilac Agouti or Lynx}
- Wide Band Color Group
  - Yellow^{a/k/a Red or Fawn}
- Chinchilla Color Group
  - Chinchilla
  - Dilute Black Chinchilla^{a/k/a Blue Chinchilla or Squirrel}
  - Brown Chinchilla^{a/k/a Chocolate Chinchilla}
  - Dilute Brown Chinchilla^{a/k/a Lilac Chinchilla}

Though common, the German Angora is not currently recognized by ARBA. The International Association of German Angora Rabbit Breeders (IAGARB) maintains a breed standard for the German Angora.

=== Giant Angora ===
- Weight: Minimum 5.4 kg (12 lb)
- ARBA-recognized varieties: Ruby-eyed White

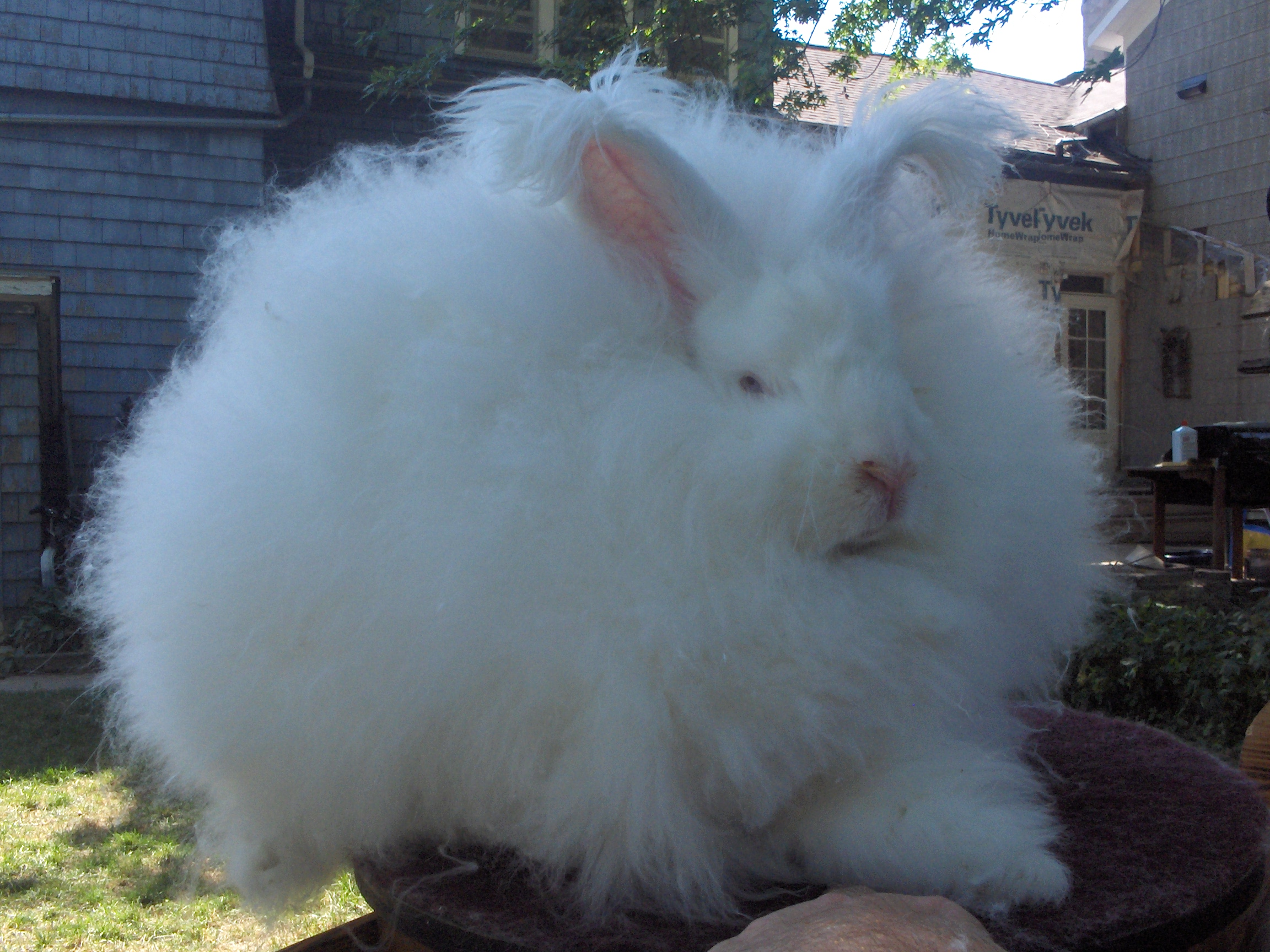
Giant Angora Ruby-eyed white buck

The Giant Angora is the largest of the ARBA-recognized Angora breeds. It was originally developed to be an efficient commercial producer that could be sustained on 16–18% protein pellets plus hay, and live in the standard sized, all-wire cages.

Because ARBA wouldn't allow German Angoras to be shown due to their body type being considered too similar to other Angora breeds, Louise Walsh of Taunton, Massachusetts, created a new breed. She used German Angoras, French Lops and Flemish Giants to develop a completely different 'commercial' body type. ARBA officially recognized the Giant Angora in 1988. Its coat includes three types of wool: soft underwool, awn fluff and awn hair.

The awn-type wool exists only in the Giant and German Angora breeds. The Giant Angora has furnishings on the face and ears. Many people confuse the German with the Giant Angora, but it is their body type that differs.

The only color variety ARBA currently recognizes for the Giant Angora is the Ruby-eyed White (REW), a color that indicates the genetic absence of pigment (albino). The Giant Angora produces more wool than the French, Satin or English Angoras. The Giant Angora is the only 6-class animal in the Angora breed. It should have a commercial-type body with a very dense coat of wool. The head should be oval in appearance, that is broad across the forehead and slightly narrower at the muzzle. The Giant Angora should have forehead tufts (head trimmings) and cheek furnishings. The head trimmings should be noticeable, but does have lighter trimmings than bucks. The ears should be lightly fringed and well tasseled. The Giant Angora is also the only breed of angora that is shown only as a ruby-eyed white. A Black color variety of the Giant Angora is in development but has not been sanctioned by ARBA.

The Giant Angora coat contains three fiber types for its texture. The underwool should be the most dominant over the other two types of hair. It should be medium-fine, soft and delicately waved and have a gentle shine. Beginning spinners may find Angora wool a challenge.

The Awn Fluff has a guard hair tip and is a stronger, wavy wool. The Awn Fluff is found between the underwool and Awn Hair. The Awn Hair, also known as guard hair, is the third type of fiber. The Awn Hair is a strong straight hair that protrudes above the wool and must be present and evident.

The classification of the Giant Angora is different from the other three breeds owing to it being a 6-class animal. The junior buck and junior doe must be under 6 months of age and have a minimum weight of 2.15 kg (4.75 lb). The intermediate buck and intermediate doe are 6–8 months of age. The senior buck and senior doe are 8 months of age or over. The senior buck must weigh at least 4.3 kg (9.5 lb). The senior doe must weigh at least 4.5 kg (10 lb).

When Giant Angoras are judged the majority of the points are based on the wool, which includes density, texture and length. The points for 'general type' include the body type, head, ears, eyes, feet, legs and tail.

Like many other 'giant' breeds of rabbit, the Giant Angora grows slowly. A doe usually takes more than a year to reach maturity (size and weight). A buck can take up to 1.5 years to mature (size and weight).

=== Satin Angora ===
- Weight: 3.0–4.5 kg (6.6–9.9 lb)
- ARBA-recognized varieties: [Includes eight color groups. The color of a Satin Angora is determined by the uniform pigment on its head, feet, and tail.]
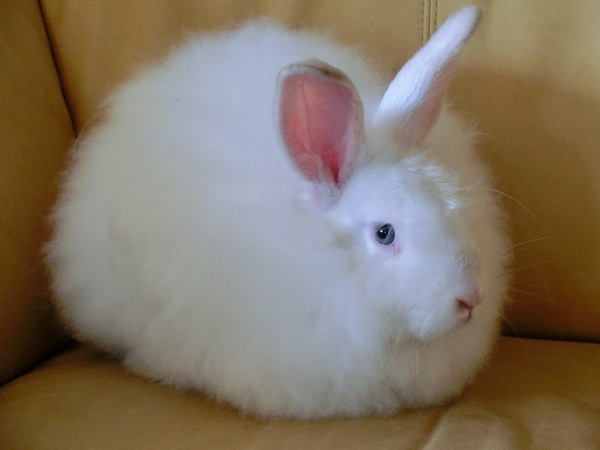
Satin Angora
Blue-eye white

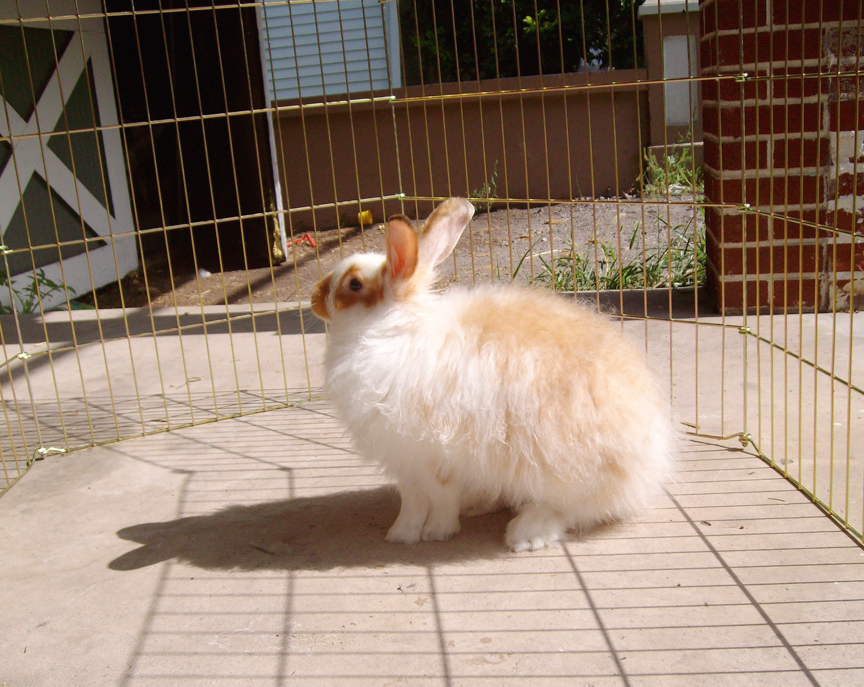
Satin Angora
Broken pattern
- White Group
  - Pointed White (includes Black, Blue, Chocolate, Lilac)
  - Blue-Eyed White
  - Red-Eyed White
- Broken Group
  - Broken
- Colored Group
  - Chestnut
  - Chocolate Agouti
  - Chocolate Chinchilla
  - Chinchilla
  - Copper
  - Lilac Chinchilla
  - Lynx
  - Opal
  - Squirrel
- Self Group
  - Black
  - Blue
  - Chocolate
  - Lilac
- Shaded Group
  - Pearl
    - Black Pearl
    - Blue Pearl
    - Chocolate Pearl
    - Lilac Pearl
    - Sable Pearl
    - Smoke Pearl
  - Sable
  - Seal
- Tortoiseshell Group
  - Blue Tortoiseshell
  - Chocolate Tortoiseshell
  - Lilac Tortoiseshell
  - Tortoiseshell
- Ticked Color Group
  - Blue Steel
  - Chocolate Steel
  - Lilac Steel
  - Steel
- Wide Band Color Group
  - Cream
  - Fawn
  - Red

The Satin Angora was developed in the late 1970s by Mrs. Meyer of Holland Landing, Ontario, Canada, who crossed French Angoras with rabbits of the Satin breed. In addition to the sheen (for which the Satin is known), true red and copper pigments emerged in the new rabbits. In all 'satinized' coats, the hair shaft has a semi-transparent outer shell that reflects light, resulting in deep color, high luster and an extremely soft and silky texture to the hair.

The Satin Angora (like the French Angora) has no furnishings on the face, ears or feet. The Satin does not produce as much wool as other Angora breeds, but this trait is being improved upon through selective breeding. While more difficult to keep groomed than the Giant or French Angora, the Satin is less difficult than the English Angora. Because of the soft texture of the wool and the lower guard-hair count in the coat, matting occurs more readily. Daily combing is therefore recommended.

Satin Angora wool is said to be stronger for spinning than other Angora varieties, but because of its slipperiness it can be more difficult to spin.

=== Other Angora rabbit breeds ===
- Finnish Angora
- Japanese Angora
- Russian Angora
- St. Lucian Angora
- Swiss Angora
- Dutch Angora
- Belgian Dwarf Angora
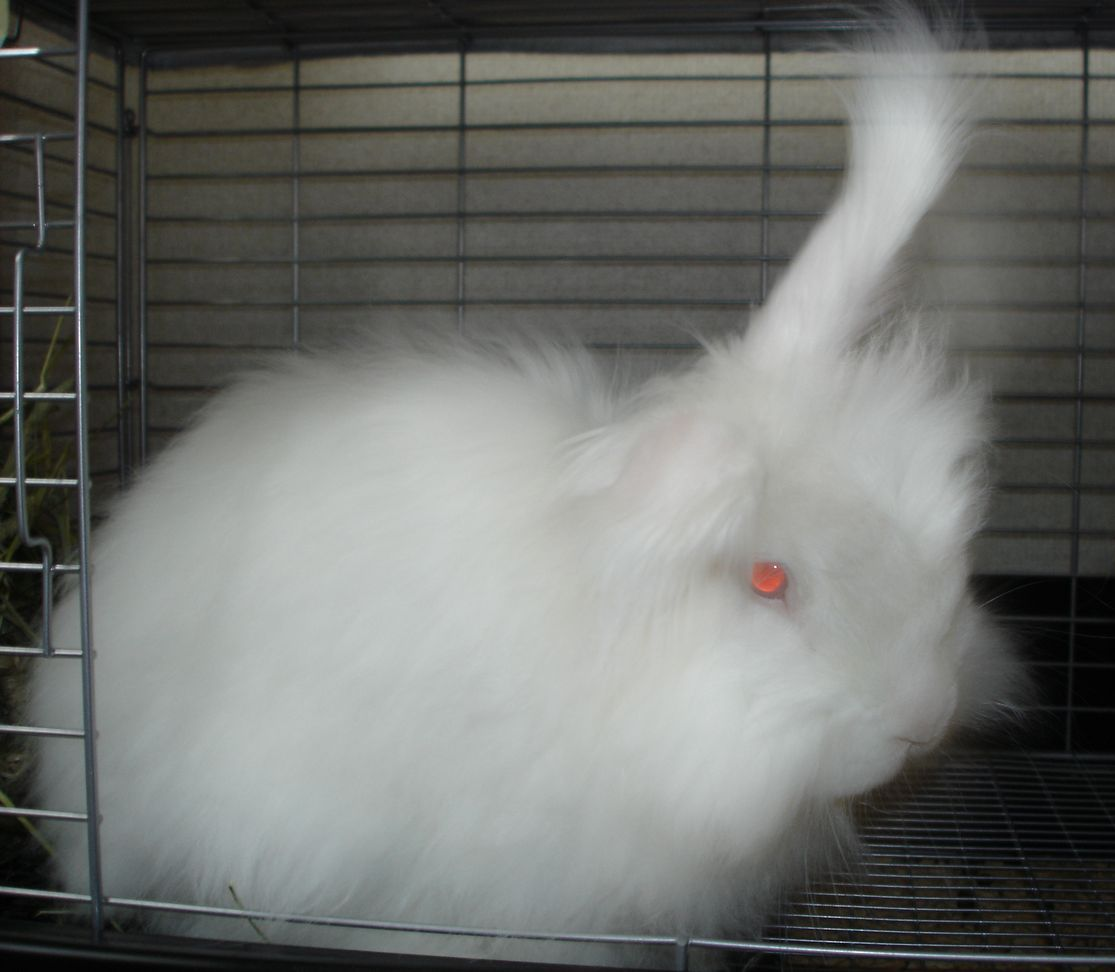
Japanese Angora
(August 2009)

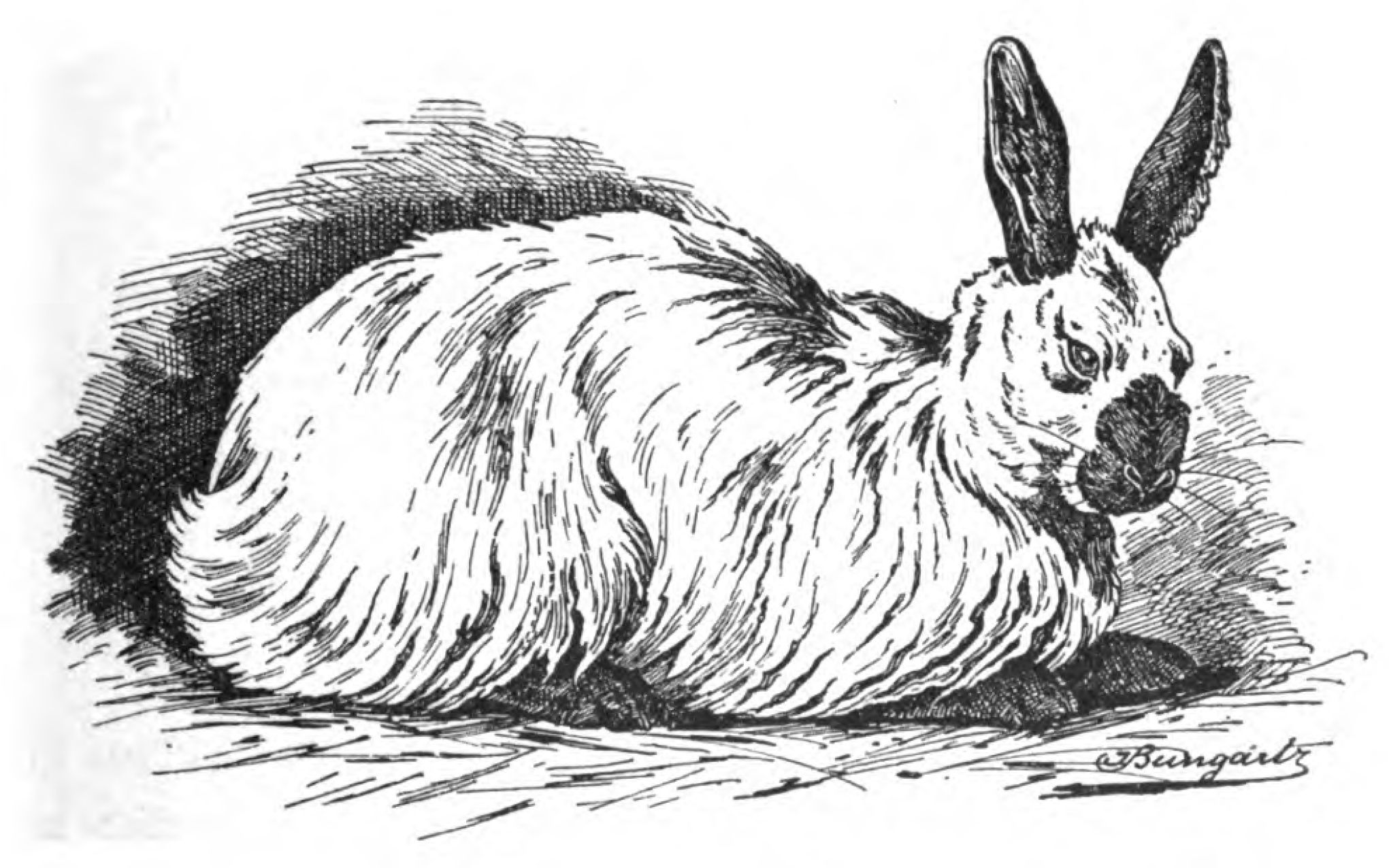
Russian Angora
Russisches Angora-Kaninchen
(Jean Bungartz 1902)

== Genetics ==
Some genes or rather mutations causing the Angora phenotype have been identified. A gene that has been repeatedly found to be affected in Angora rabbits is the FGF5 gene. For example, a specific mutation (T19234C) changes the amino acid threonine (T) to cysteine (C) in the Fgf5 protein, causing the phenotype.

== See also ==
- Angora project
- List of rabbit breeds
- Fur farming
