= Winter coat =

Winter coat can mean:

- A coat worn by people in winter or other cold weather
- An animal coat grown by the animal to keep warm in the winter
