= Fur =

Soft, thick, hairy coat of a mammal

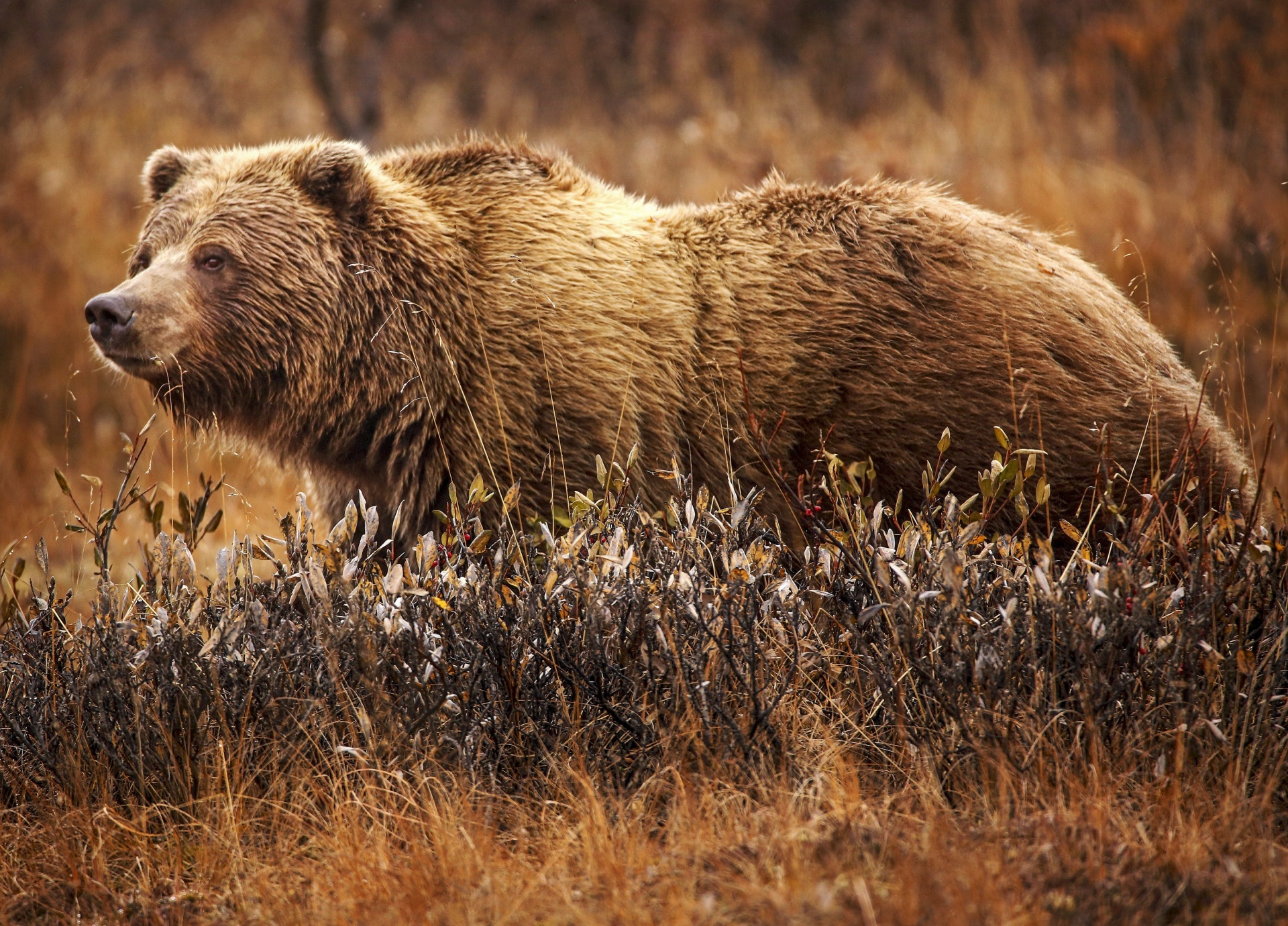
Like many mammals, grizzly bears are covered in thick fur.

Fur is the soft, thick growth of hair that covers the skin of almost all mammals. It consists of a combination of oily guard hair on top and thick underfur beneath. The guard hair keeps moisture from touching the skin; the underfur acts as an insulating blanket that keeps the animal warm.

The fur of mammals has many purposes: protection, sensory, waterproofing, and camouflaging, with the primary purpose being thermoregulation. The types of hair include

- definitive, which may be shed after reaching a certain length;
- vibrissae, which are sensory hairs and are most commonly whiskers;
- pelage, which consists of guard hairs, underfur, and awn hair;
- spines, which are a type of stiff guard hair used for defense in, for example, porcupines;
- bristles, which are long hairs usually used in visual signals, such as the mane of a lion;
- velli, often called "down fur", which insulates newborn mammals; and
- wool, which is long, soft, and often curly.

Hair length is unimportant in thermoregulation, as some tropical mammals, such as sloths, have the same fur length as some arctic mammals but with less insulation; and, conversely, other tropical mammals with short hair have the same insulating value as arctic mammals. The denseness of fur can increase an animal's insulation value, and arctic mammals especially have dense fur; for example, the muskox has guard hairs measuring 30 cm (12 in) as well as a dense underfur, which forms an airtight coat, allowing them to survive in temperatures of −40 °C (−40 °F). Some desert mammals, such as camels, use dense fur to prevent solar heat from reaching their skin, allowing the animal to stay cool; a camel's fur may reach 70 °C (158 °F) in the summer, but the skin stays at 40 °C (104 °F). Aquatic mammals, conversely, trap air in their fur to conserve heat by keeping the skin dry.

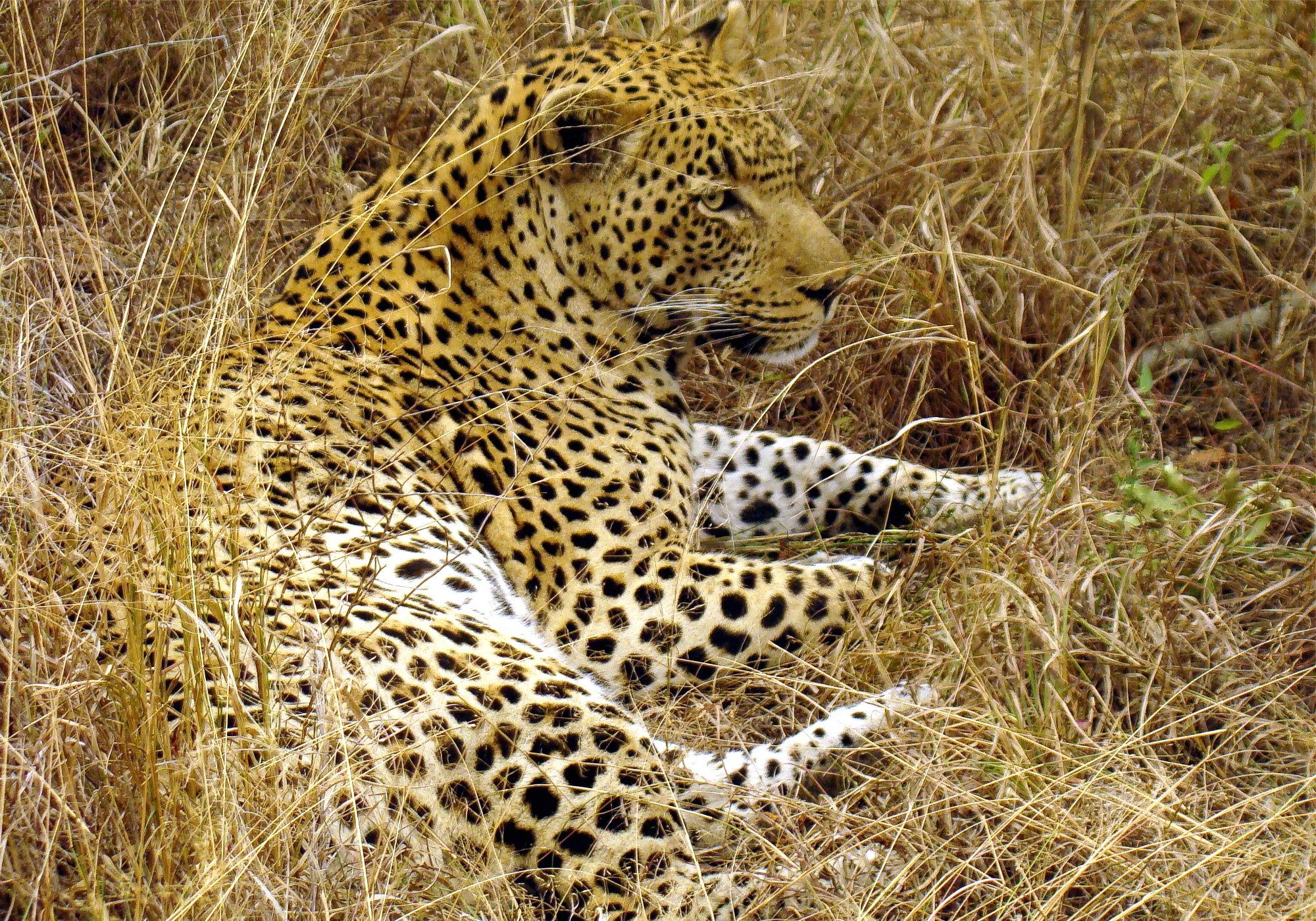
A leopard's disruptively colored coat provides camouflage for this ambush predator.

Mammalian coats are colored for a variety of reasons, the major selective pressures including camouflage, sexual selection, communication, and physiological processes such as temperature regulation. Camouflage is a powerful influence in many mammals, as it helps to conceal individuals from predators or prey. Aposematism, warning off possible predators, is the most likely explanation of the black-and-white pelage of many mammals which are able to defend themselves, such as in the foul-smelling skunk and the powerful and aggressive honey badger. In arctic and subarctic mammals such as the arctic fox (Vulpes lagopus), collared lemming (Dicrostonyx groenlandicus), stoat (Mustela erminea), and snowshoe hare (Lepus americanus), seasonal color change between brown in summer and white in winter is driven largely by camouflage. Differences in female and male coat color may indicate nutrition and hormone levels, important in mate selection. Some arboreal mammals, notably primates and marsupials, have shades of violet, green, or blue skin on parts of their bodies, indicating some distinct advantage in their largely arboreal habitat due to convergent evolution. The green coloration of sloths, however, is the result of a symbiotic relationship with algae. Coat color is sometimes sexually dimorphic, as in many primate species. Coat color may influence the ability to retain heat, depending on how much light is reflected. Mammals with darker colored coats can absorb more heat from solar radiation and stay warmer; some smaller mammals, such as voles, have darker fur in the winter. The white, pigmentless fur of arctic mammals, such as the polar bear, may reflect more solar radiation directly onto the skin.

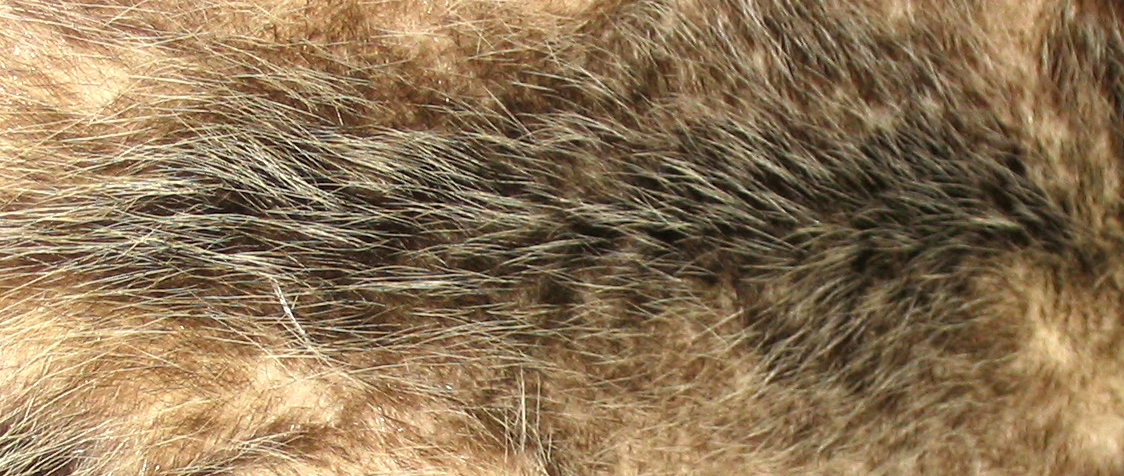
Opossum fur

The term pelage – first known use in English c. 1828 (French, from Middle French, from poil for 'hair', from Old French peilss, from Latin pilus) – is sometimes used to refer to an animal's complete coat. The term fur is also used to refer to animal pelts that have been processed into leather with their hair still attached. The words fur or furry are also used, more casually, to refer to hair-like growths or formations, particularly when the subject being referred to exhibits a dense coat of fine, soft "hairs". If layered, rather than grown as a single coat, it may consist of short down hairs, long guard hairs, and in some cases, medium awn hairs. Mammals with reduced amounts of fur are often called "naked", as with the naked mole-rat, or "hairless", as with hairless dogs.

An animal with commercially valuable fur is known within the fur industry as a furbearer. The use of fur as clothing or decoration is controversial; animal welfare advocates object to the trapping and killing of wildlife, and the confinement and killing of animals on fur farms.

== Composition ==
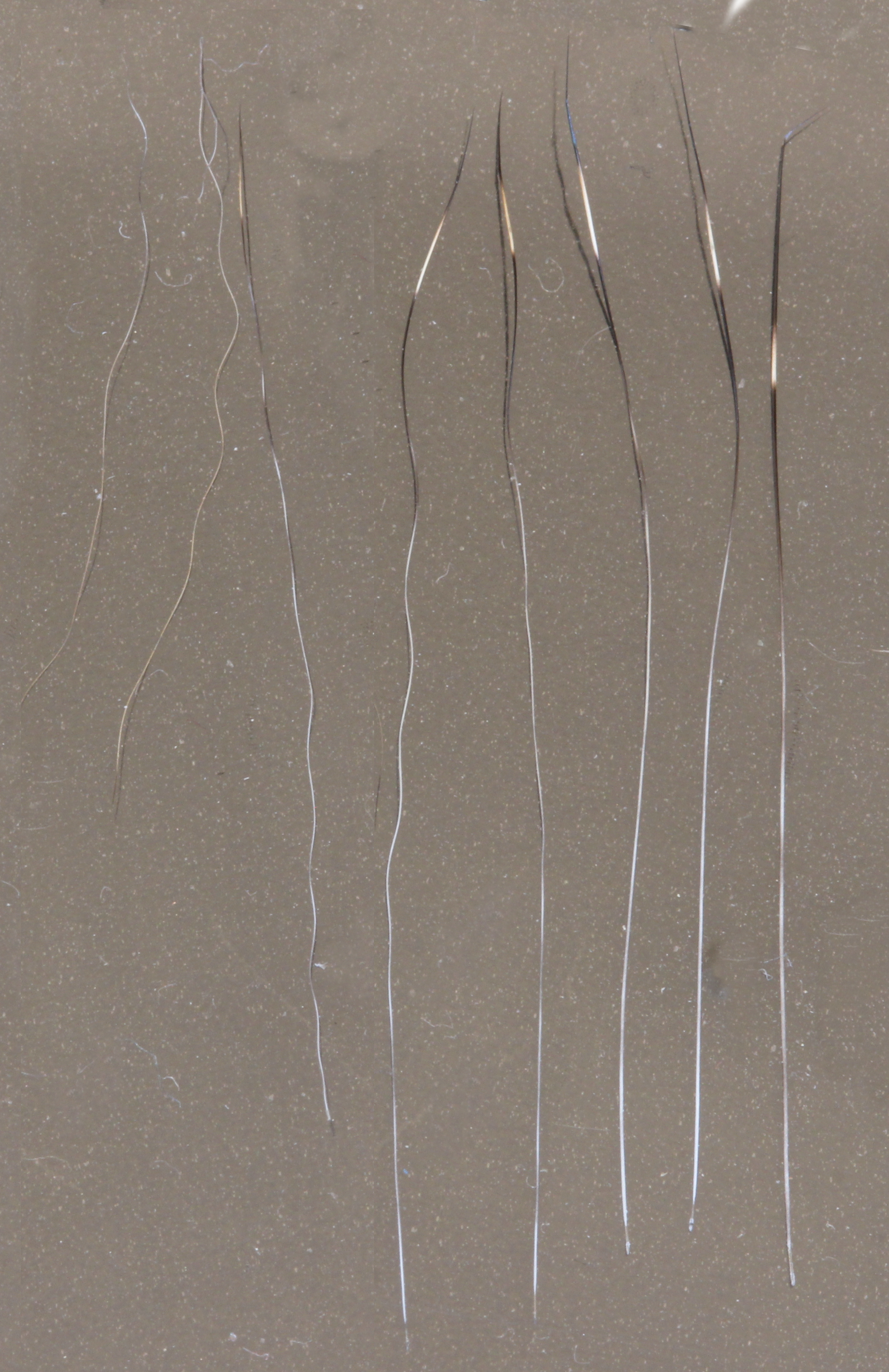
Down, awn and guard hairs of a domestic tabby cat

The modern mammalian fur arrangement is known to have occurred as far back as docodonts, haramiyidans and eutriconodonts, with specimens of Castorocauda, Megaconus and Spinolestes preserving compound follicles with both guard hair and underfur.

Fur may consist of three layers, each with a different type of hair.

=== Down hair ===
Down hair (also known as underfur, undercoat, underhair or ground hair) is the bottom – or inner – layer, composed of wavy or curly hairs with no straight portions or sharp points. Down hairs, which are also flat, tend to be the shortest and most numerous in the coat. Thermoregulation is the principal function of the down hair, which insulates a layer of dry air next to the skin.

=== Awn hair ===
The awn hair can be thought of as a hybrid, bridging the gap between the distinctly different characteristics of down and guard hairs. Awn hairs begin their growth much like guard hairs, but less than halfway to their full length, awn hairs start to grow thin and wavy like down hair. The proximal part of the awn hair assists in thermoregulation (like the down hair), whereas the distal part can shed water (like the guard hair). The awn hair's thin basal portion does not allow the amount of piloerection that the stiffer guard hairs are capable of. Mammals with well-developed down and guard hairs also usually have large numbers of awn hairs, which may even sometimes be the bulk of the visible coat.

=== Guard hair ===
Guard hair (overhair) is the top—or outer—layer of the coat. Guard hairs are longer, generally coarser, and have nearly straight shafts that protrude through the layer of softer down hair. The distal end of the guard hair is the visible layer of most mammal coats. This layer has the most marked pigmentation and gloss, manifesting as coat markings that are adapted for camouflage or display. Guard hair repels water and blocks sunlight, protecting the undercoat and skin in wet or aquatic habitats, and from the sun's ultraviolet radiation. Guard hairs can also reduce the severity of cuts or scratches to the skin. Many mammals, such as the domestic dog and cat, have a pilomotor reflex that raises their guard hairs as part of a threat display when agitated.

== Mammals with reduced fur ==
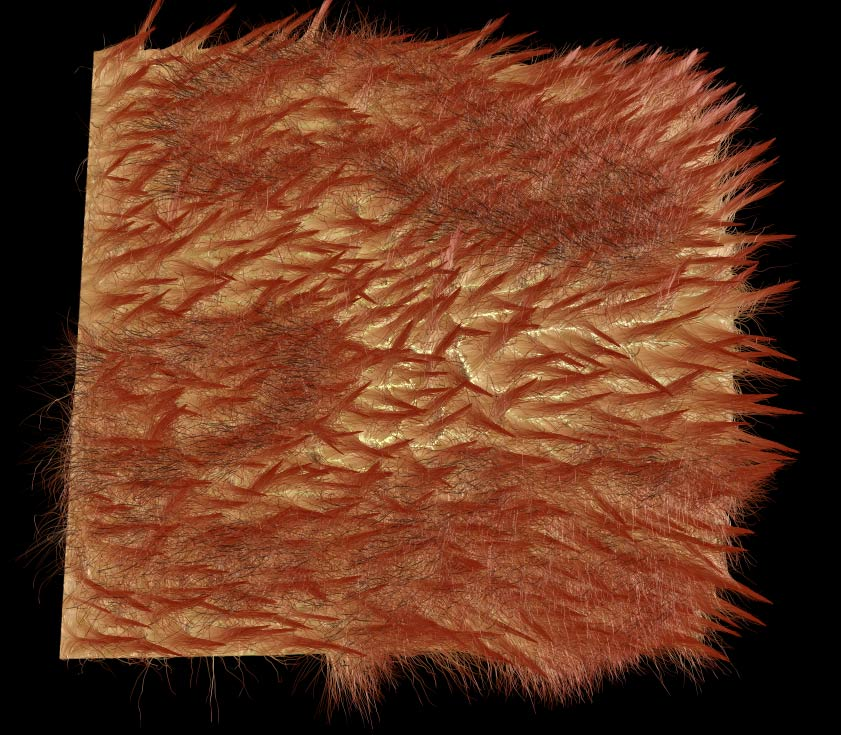
Computer generated image of wet fur

Hair is one of the defining characteristics of mammals; however, several species or breeds have considerably reduced amounts of fur. These are often called "naked" or "hairless".

=== Natural selection ===
Some mammals naturally have reduced amounts of fur. Some semiaquatic or aquatic mammals such as cetaceans, pinnipeds and hippopotamuses have evolved hairlessness, presumably to reduce resistance through water. The naked mole-rat has evolved hairlessness, perhaps as an adaptation to their subterranean lifestyle. Two of the largest extant terrestrial mammals, the elephant and the rhinoceros, are largely hairless. The hairless bat is mostly hairless but does have short bristly hairs around its neck, on its front toes, and around the throat sac, along with fine hairs on the head and tail membrane. Most hairless animals cannot go in the sun for long periods of time, or stay in the cold for too long. Marsupials are born hairless and grow out fur later in development.

Humans are the only primate species that have undergone significant hair loss. The hairlessness of humans compared to related species may be due to loss of functionality in the pseudogene KRTHAP1 (which helps produce keratin). Although the researchers dated the mutation to 240,000 years ago, both the Altai Neandertal and Denisovan peoples possessed the loss-of-function mutation, indicating it is much older. Mutations in the gene HR can lead to complete hair loss, though this is not typical in humans.

=== Artificial selection ===
At times, when a hairless domesticated animal is discovered, usually owing to a naturally occurring genetic mutation, humans may intentionally inbreed those hairless individuals and, after multiple generations, artificially create hairless breeds. There are several breeds of hairless cats, perhaps the most commonly known being the Sphynx cat. Similarly, there are some breeds of hairless dogs. Other examples of artificially selected hairless animals include the hairless guinea-pig, nude mouse, and the hairless rat.

== Use in clothing ==
Fur has long served as a source of clothing for humans, including Neanderthals. Historically, it was worn for its insulating quality, with aesthetics becoming a factor over time. Pelts were worn in or out, depending on their characteristics and desired use. Today fur and trim used in garments may be dyed bright colors or to mimic exotic animal patterns, or shorn close like velvet. The term "a fur" may connote a coat, wrap, or shawl.

The manufacturing of fur clothing involves obtaining animal pelts where the hair is left on the animal's processed skin. In contrast, making leather involves removing the hair from the hide or pelt and using only the skin.

Fur is also used to make felt. A common felt is made from beaver fur and is used in bowler hats, top hats, and high-end cowboy hats.

Common furbearers used include fox, rabbit, mink, muskrat, beaver, ermine, otter, sable, seal, coyote, chinchilla, raccoon, and possum.

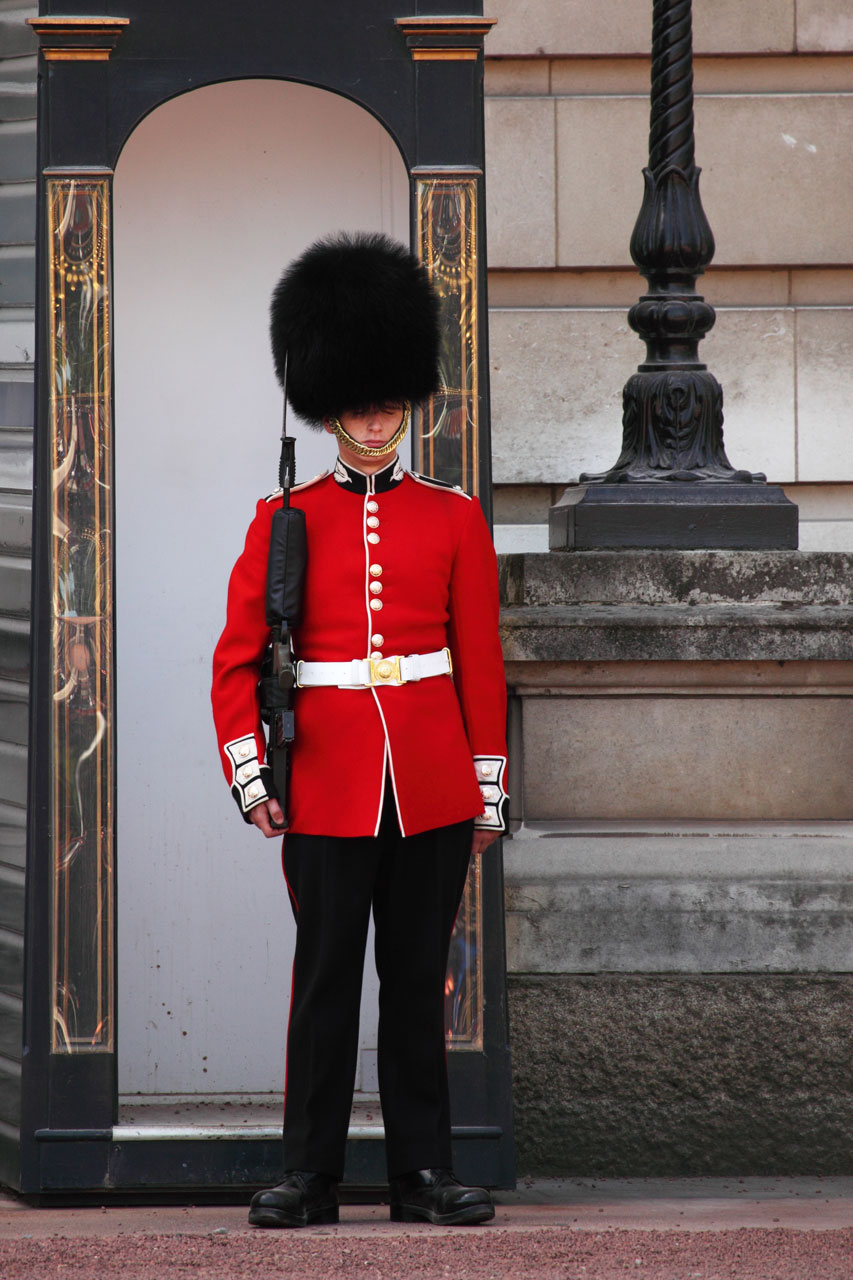
The iconic bearskins of the King's Guard at Buckingham Palace are made from the fur of American black bears.

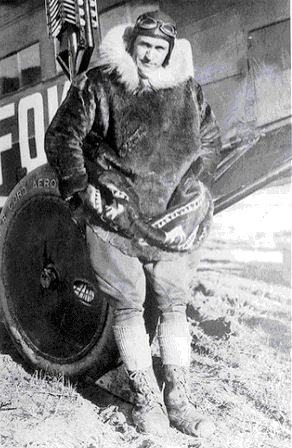
A seal fur coat worn by Carl Ben Eielson (1897–1929), USAF pilot and Arctic explorer

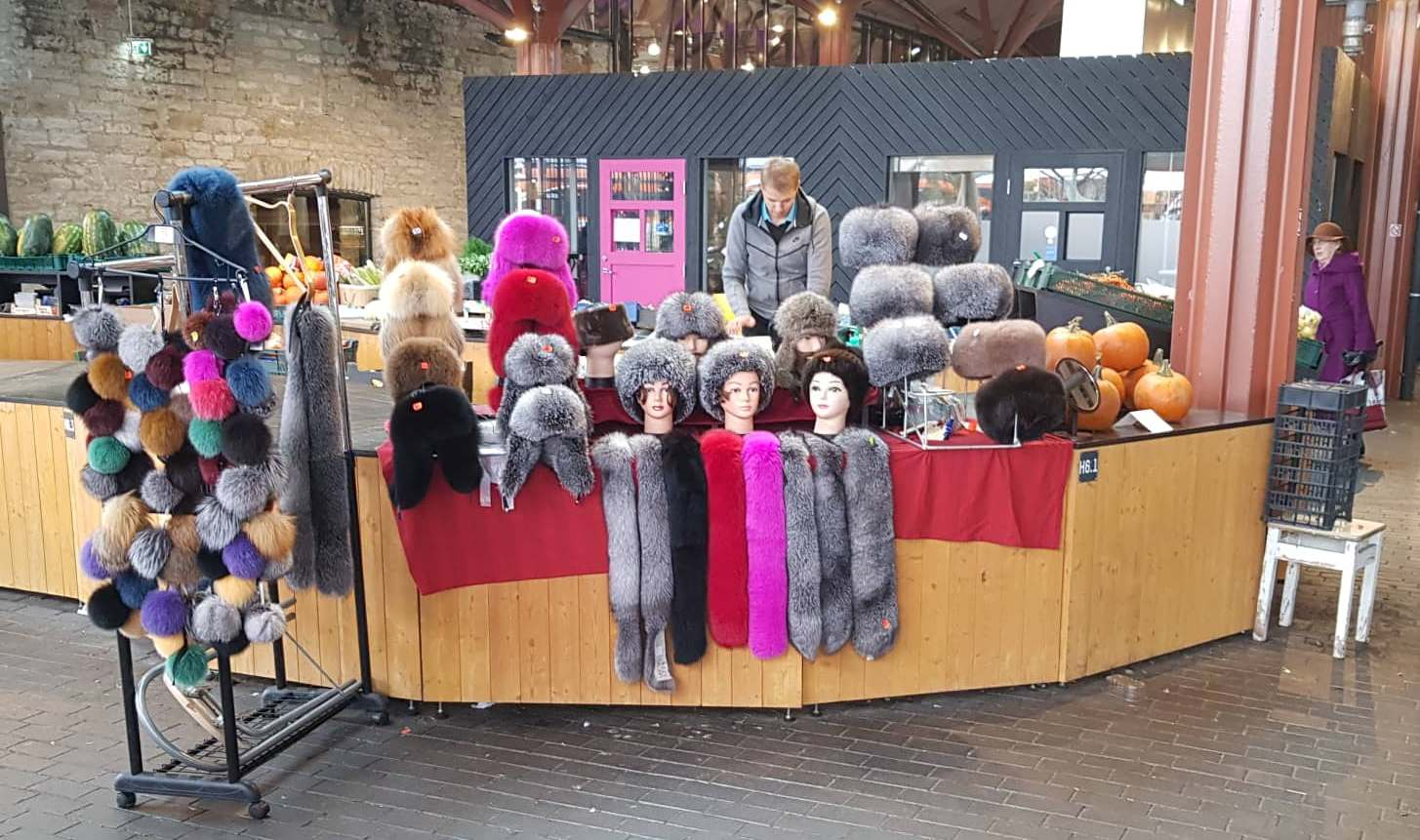
A fur store in Tallinn, Estonia, in 2019

== See also ==
- Angora wool
- Animal coat
- Animal coloration
- Cat coat genetics
- Futfell
- Plumage
- Rabbit hair
- Skinning
- Tanning (leather)
