= Atrichia with papular lesions =

- Atrichia with papular lesions is inherited in an autosomal recessive manner.
- Specialty: Dermatology

Atrichia with papular lesions (a.k.a. "Papular atrichia") is a diffuse hair loss caused by an abnormality of the human homologue of the mouse hairless gene.

It is associated with HR.

== See also ==
- Cicatricial alopecia
- List of cutaneous conditions
