= Angora project =

Nazi cuniculture project during World War II

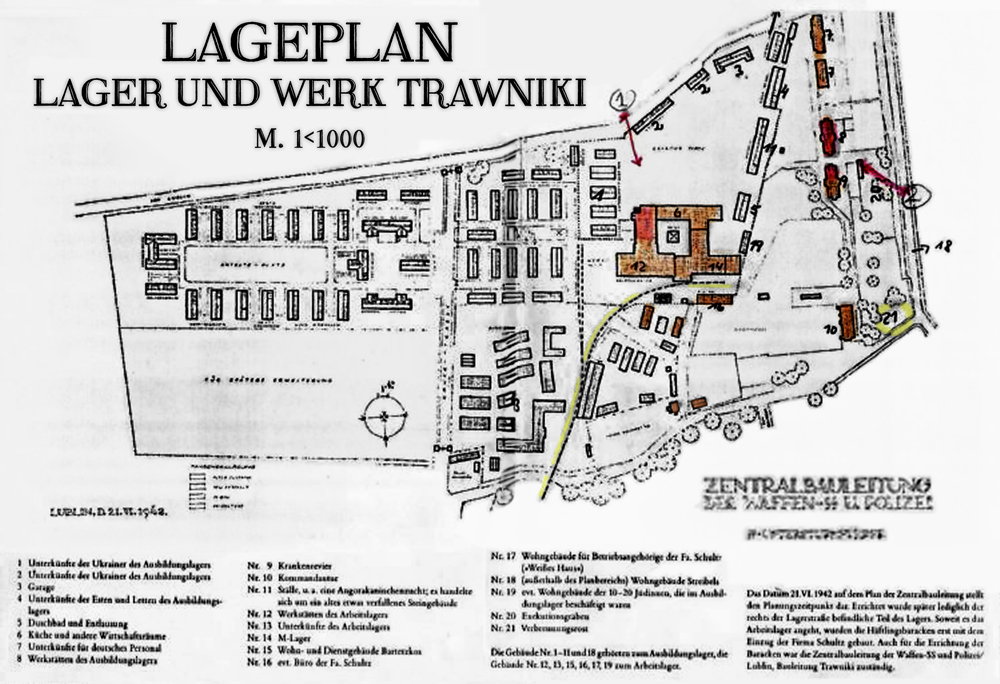
Trawniki concentration camp near, Lublin Poland Original German site plan dated 21 June 1942 reads, in part [verbatim translation]: No. 11: Stables, including an Angora rabbit breeding facility;it was an old dilapidated stone building

The Angora project or Angora rabbit project was a Nazi SS endeavor in cuniculture during World War II that bred Angora rabbits to provide Angora wool and fur, as well as meat. The Angora rabbit's hair and pelt is known for strength and durability, and it was also "associated with luxurious evening wear, [and] would be an elegant solution for keeping SS officers and the German military warm and able to endure rough wartime conditions". Angora rabbits were raised in Nazi German concentration camps, including Auschwitz, Buchenwald, Dachau, and Trawniki.

A bound volume entitled Angora that belonged to Heinrich Himmler, chief of the Nazi SS, was discovered in a farmhouse with his other papers near the end of World War II. It tells the story of the Angora rabbit project that operated in the Nazi death camps.

Chicago Tribune war correspondent Sigrid Schultz found the book in its hiding place near Himmler's alpine villa, and described the significance of the Angora project:

"In the same compound where 800 human beings would be packed into barracks that were barely adequate for 200, the rabbits lived in luxury in their own elegant hutches. In Buchenwald, where tens of thousands of human beings starved to death, rabbits enjoyed beautifully prepared meals. The SS men who whipped, tortured, and killed prisoners saw to it that the rabbits enjoyed loving care."

The rabbits were raised for their soft, warm fur, which was shaved and used for, among other things, the linings of jackets for Luftwaffe pilots. Himmler, in a 1943 speech (referring to the prisoners that endured forced labor), stated:

"We Germans, who are the only people in the world who have a decent attitude towards animals[,] will assume a decent attitude toward these human animals; but it is a crime against our blood to worry about these people."

Today, Himmler's Angora book is housed at the Wisconsin Historical Society. Photographs, charts and maps from the book are among the more than 27,000 images available in the Wisconsin Historical Society's digital collections. Angora was featured in a Wisconsin Historical Images online gallery in March 2007.
