= Awn hair =

Intermediate hairs in a mammal's coat

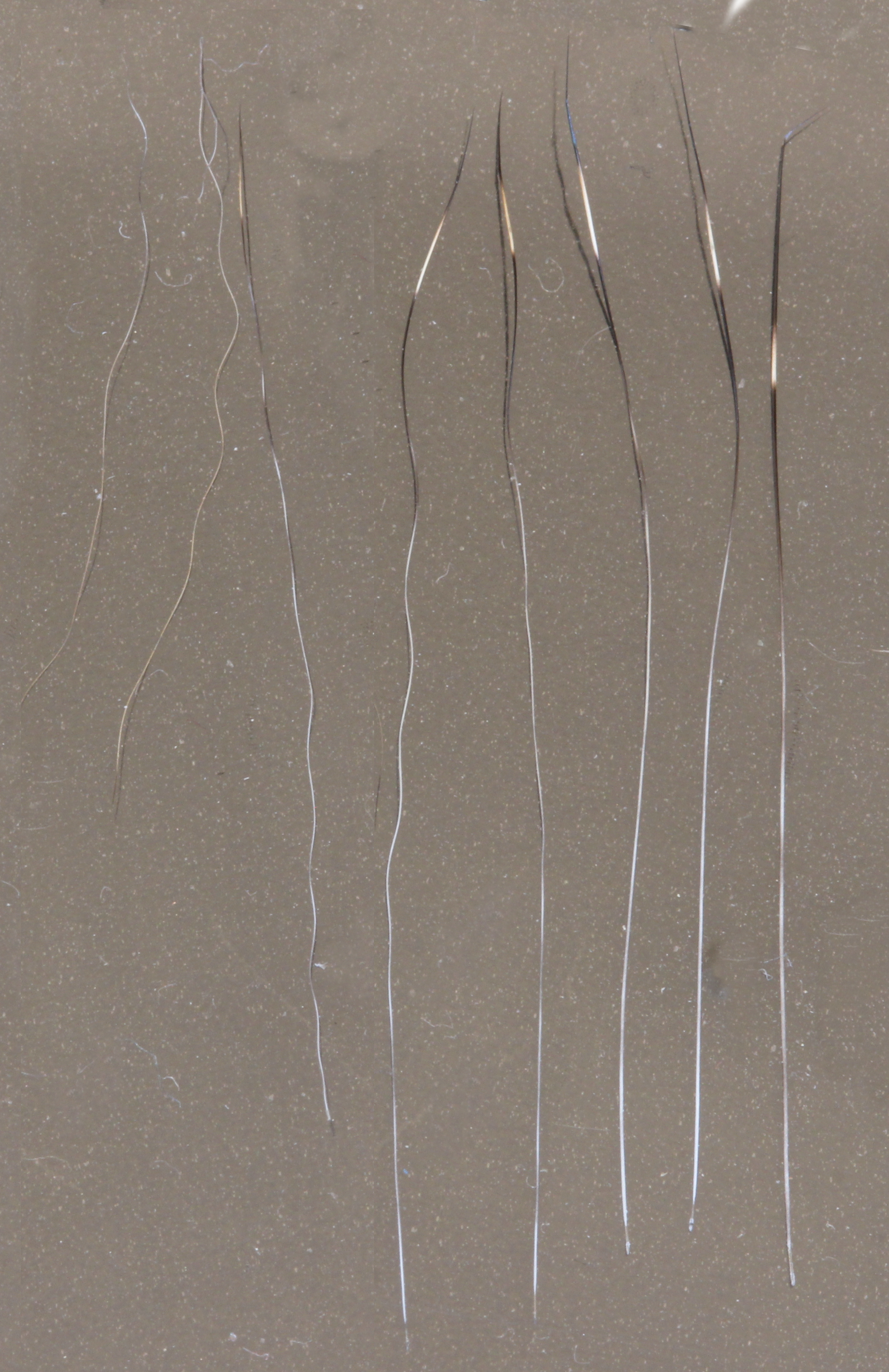
Down, awn and guard hairs of a domestic tabby cat

Awn hairs are the intermediate hairs in a mammal's coat. They are shorter than the guard hairs and longer than the down hairs. They help with insulation and protect the down hairs underneath. Most of the visible coat is made of this kind of hair.

Among rabbits, each guard hair is surrounded by a number of awn hairs. The awn hairs are slightly shorter, and have a flat (rather than pointed) tip. They also are slightly wavy and have a thinner cortex. Clustered around each awn hair are two more hair types, the awn wool and underwool.

Awn hair is also known as grannenhaare. Awn hairs are distally thicker in comparison to down hair and have a shift in the shape towards the top of the hair. There is another version of awn hair, known as grannenflaumhaare or down awn hair, which is thin and crimped like underfur towards the proximal end of the hair, while the thickened distal end resembles the corresponding part of a guard hair.

== See also ==
- Coat (animal) for a general discussion of coats
- Coat (dog) for details about dog coats
- Fur
- Guard hair
- Down hair
