= Guard hair =

Longest, most coarse hairs in a mammal's coat

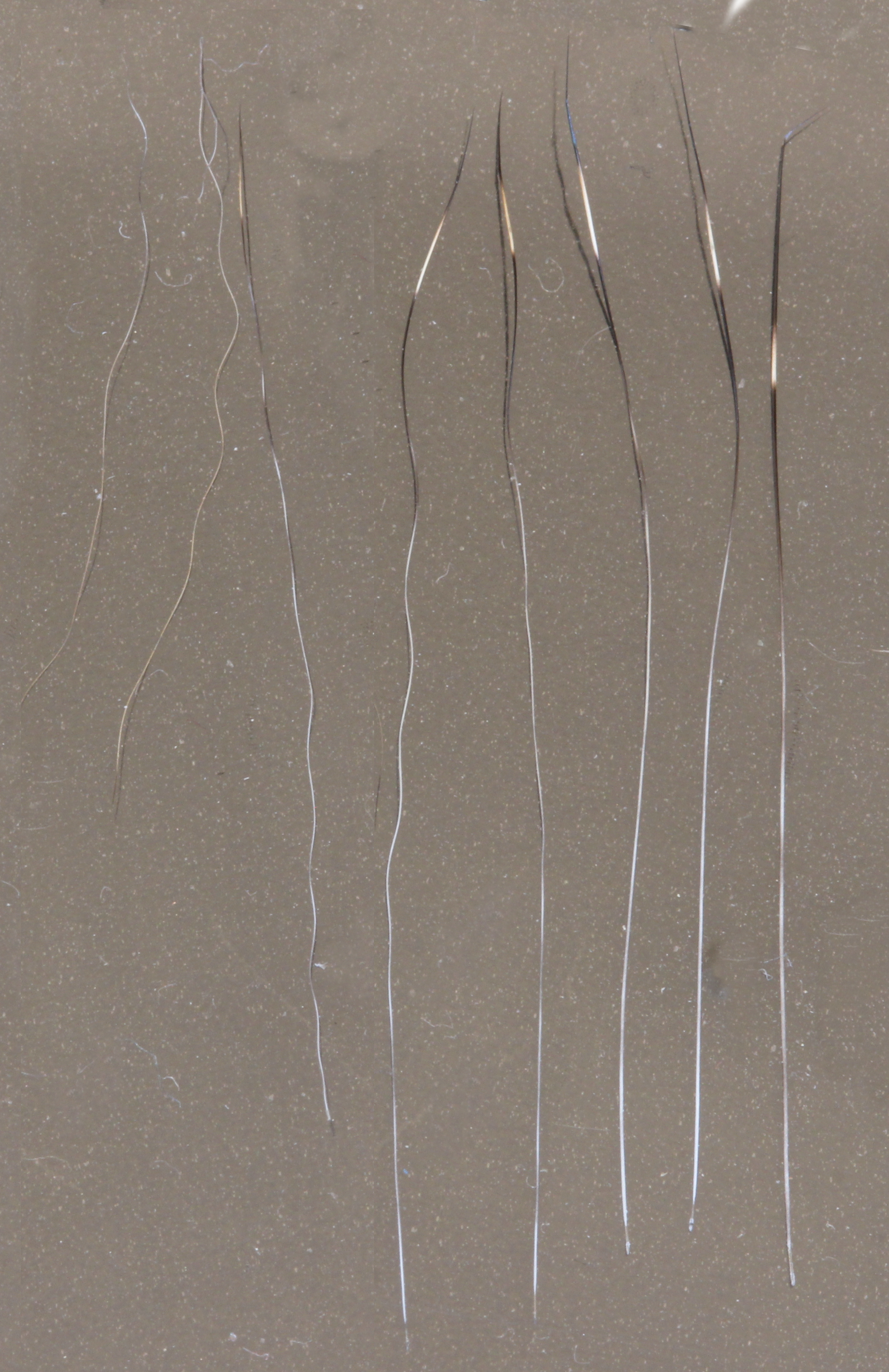
Down and guard hairs of a domestic tabby cat

Guard hair or overhair is the outer layer of hair of most mammals, which overlay the fur. Guard hairs are long and coarse and protect the rest of the pelage (fur) from abrasion and frequently from moisture. They are visible on the surface of the fur and usually lend a characteristic contour and color pattern. Underneath the contour hair is the short, dense, fine down. There are three types of guard hair: awns, bristles, and spines.

== Description ==
Guard hair (overhair) is the top or outer layer of the coat. Guard hairs are longer, generally coarser, and have nearly straight shafts that protrude through the layer of softer down hair. The distal end of the guard hair is the visible layer of most mammal coats. The guard hair is spread over most of the skin, constitutes the main mass of the fur, and gives the contour and color of the fur, from the combinations in different percentages of two pigments: brown and black eumelanin, and yellow and red pheomelanin. This layer has the most marked pigmentation and gloss, manifesting as coat markings that are adapted for camouflage or display. Guard hair repels water and blocks sunlight, protecting the undercoat and skin in wet or aquatic habitats, and from the sun's ultraviolet radiation. Guard hairs can also reduce the severity of cuts or scratches to the skin. Many mammals, such as the domestic dog and cat, have a pilomotor reflex that raises their guard hairs as part of a threat display when agitated.

== Types of guard hair ==
The three major types of guard hair recognized are awns, spines and bristles, although intermediates between these types are known.

=== Awn ===
Awn hair is the most common type of guard hair, characterized by an expanded distal end, a thin base, and definitive growth. The shafts of the awn are thick and usually spindle-shaped (or blade- or shieldlike), thinning gradually at the tip; the spindle-shaped portion is hard and usually differently colored. Awns usually lie in one direction, giving the pelage a distinct contour. This type of hair is found in carnivorans. In equids, cattle, and on the face and legs of sheep, the covering bristles are shorter, stiffer, straighter, and inconspicuously spindled.

=== Bristles ===
Bristles are firm, generally long hairs in equids and bovids, some carnivorans, etc., that grow continuously and form manes. The mane often varies by sex, serving to distinguish the sexes (sexual dimorphism). For example, male lions have a collar of long, hard outline hair that grows continuously and extends to the shoulders and forms a mane on the back of the neck. Bristles function as visual signals that augment facial expressions (e.g., lions) or body postures (e.g., horses).

=== Spines ===
The guard hairs are sometimes modified to form defensive spines. Spines are the stiff, enlarged guard hairs that exhibit definitive growth and form the protective quills of echidnas, hedgehogs and especially porcupines. In porcupines, the cuticular scales are elongate and form barbs that make it difficult to remove imbedded spines.
