= HR (gene) =

Protein-coding gene in the species Homo sapiens

Identifiers
- Aliases: HR, ALUNC, AU, HSA277165, HYPT4, MUHH, MUHH1, hair growth associated, lysine demethylase and nuclear receptor corepressor, HR lysine demethylase and nuclear receptor corepressor
- External IDs: OMIM: 602302; MGI: 96223; GeneCards: HR
Enzyme activity
EC #	BRENDA	ExPASy	KEGG	MetaCyc
1.14.11.65	↗	↗	↗	↗

Gene location (Human)
Chr.	Chromosome 8 (human)
Band	8p21.3	Start	22,114,419 bp
Band	8p21.3	End	22,133,384 bp

Gene location (Mouse)
Chr.	Chromosome 14 (mouse)
Band	14|14 D2	Start	70,789,652 bp
Band	14|14 D2	End	70,810,988 bp
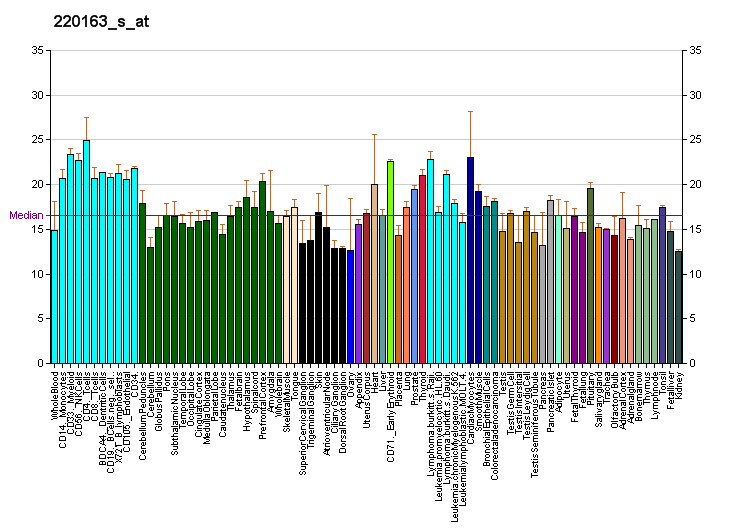

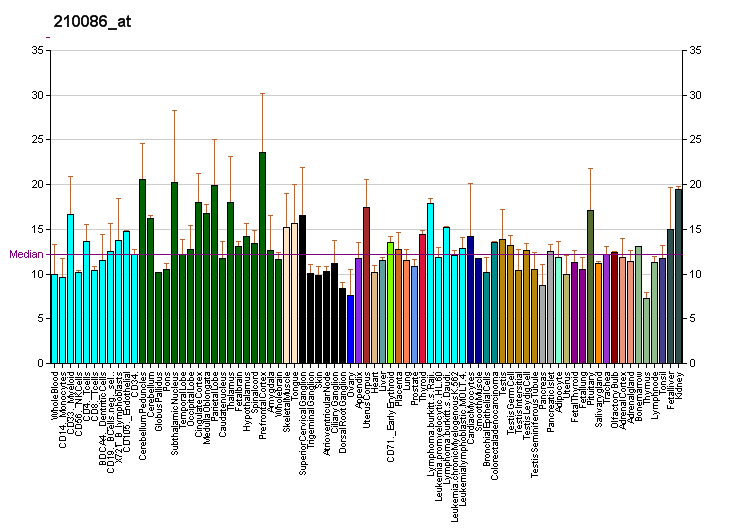
RNA expression pattern
Bgee	Human / Mouse (ortholog); Top expressed in: skin of abdomen; skin of leg; right hemisphere of cerebellum; mucosa of transverse colon; vulva; right frontal lobe; nipple; sural nerve; prefrontal cortex; parotid gland / Top expressed in: lip; hair bulb; muscle of thigh; Epithelium of large intestine; inner root sheath; esophagus; triceps brachii muscle; epithelium of rectum; skin of back; inner enamel epithelium; More reference expression data
BioGPS	More reference expression data
Gene ontology
Molecular function	DNA-binding transcription factor activity; DNA binding; oxidoreductase activity; transcription corepressor activity; metal ion binding; transcription cis-regulatory region binding; chromatin DNA binding; histone H3-methyl-lysine-9 demethylase activity
Cellular component	nuclear body; nucleoplasm; chromatin; nucleus
Biological process	negative regulation of transcription, DNA-templated; transcription, DNA-templated; regulation of transcription, DNA-templated; histone H3-K9 demethylation
Sources:Amigo / QuickGO
Orthologs
Databases	NCBI: entry; OMA: entry
Species	Human	Mouse
Entrez	55806	15460
Ensembl	ENSG00000168453	ENSMUSG00000022096
UniProt	O43593	Q61645
RefSeq (mRNA)	NM_005144; NM_018411	NM_021877; NM_001379479
RefSeq (protein)	NP_005135; NP_060881	NP_068677; NP_001366408
Location (UCSC)	Chr 8: 22.11 – 22.13 Mb	Chr 14: 70.79 – 70.81 Mb
PubMed search
- Wikidata
View/Edit Human	View/Edit Mouse

HR is a gene encoding Protein hairless.

This gene encodes a protein whose function has been linked to hair growth. A similar protein in rat functions as a transcriptional corepressor for thyroid hormone and interacts with histone deacetylases.

== Human Genetics ==
Variations in this gene are involved in low levels of hair (baldness / alopecia / hypotrichosis) Mutations in this gene in humans have been documented in cases of autosomal recessive congenital alopecia and atrichia with papular lesions.

The protein contains a Zinc finger domain.

== See also ==
- Corepressor
