= Futfell =

Dressed skins of a slink lamb

Futfell (Fotfaill, Fitfeal) is the term used in Scotland to refer to the dressed skins of a slink lamb or one that is prematurely born. Futfell was a product that was exported from Scotland.

In his ledger (1492–1503), Andrew Halyburton makes a reference to Futfell.

== Fell ==
Fell denotes the epidermis or outer layer of an animal's skin or hide. To be more precise, "fell" refers to the layer of skin known as the cuticle, which is situated directly adjacent to the flesh. "Foot-fell" is a term of Scottish origin, defined by John Jamieson as "the skin or pelt of a lamb that has perished shortly after birth.
