= Animal coat =

Nature and quality of a mammal's pelage

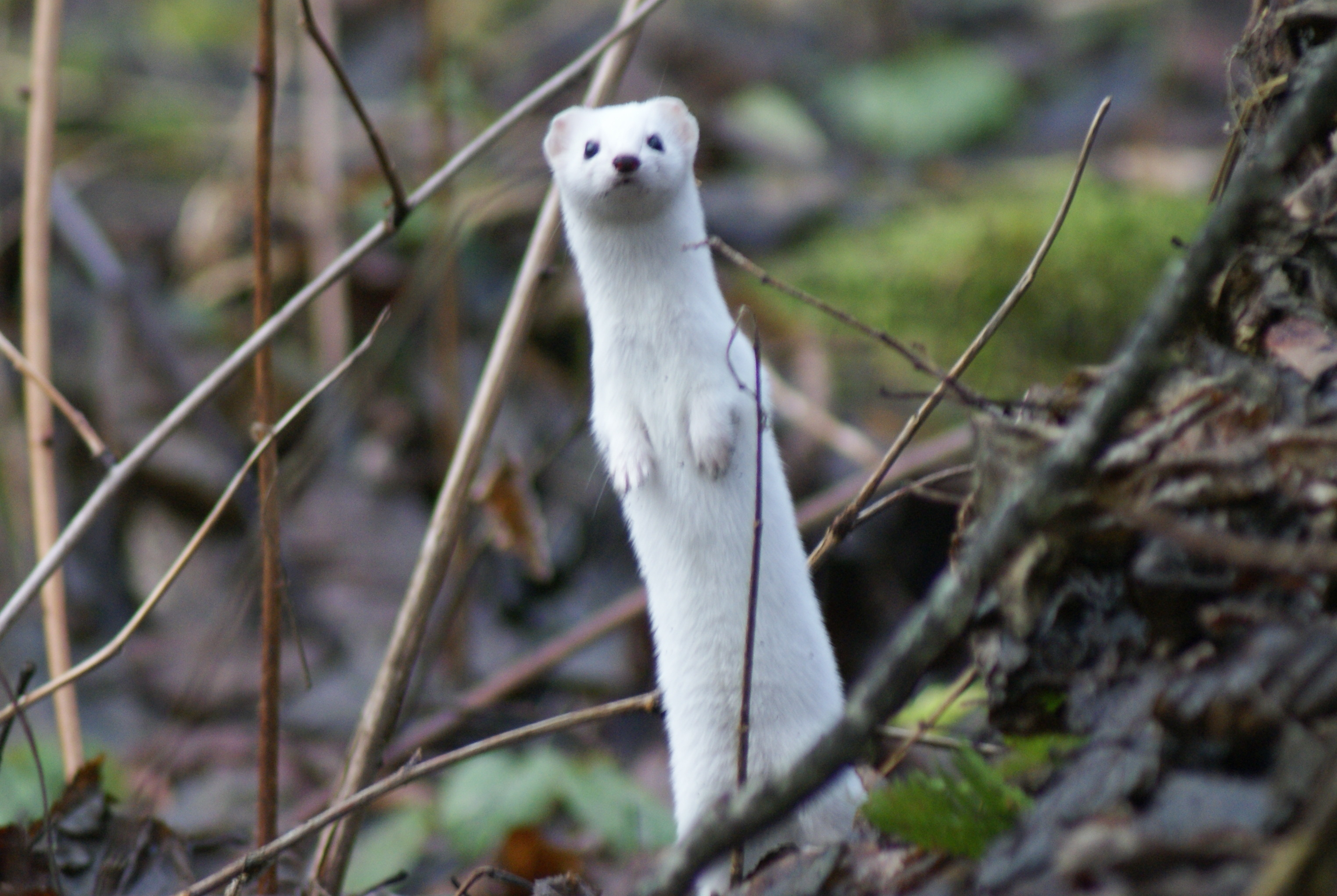
A least weasel (Mustela nivalis) displaying a white winter coat in Poland. In warmer seasons and climates, weasels have predominantly brown coats.

Coat is the nature and quality of a mammal's fur. In the animal fancy, coat is an attribute that reflects the quality of a specimen's breeding as well as the level of the animal's care, conditioning, and management. Coat is an integral aspect of the judging at competitions such as a conformation dog show, a cat show, a horse show (especially showmanship classes), or a rabbit show.

The pelage of a show animal may be divided into different types of hair, fur or wool with a texture ranging from downy to spiky. In addition, the animal may be single-coated or may have a number of coats, such as an undercoat and a topcoat (also called an outer coat or, sometimes, overcoat), which is made up of guard hair. The state of the coat is considered an indication of the animal's breeding and health.

Animals might have different coat quality for different seasons. Normally, animals with fur or hair body coats may develop a thicker and/or longer winter coat in colder times of the year, which will shed out to a shorter, sleeker, summer coat as the days lengthen into spring and summer. This process may not occur in a noticeable fashion in climates that are warm year-round, though animals may nonetheless shed their coats periodically. The process may also be minimized by artificially keeping the animal blanketed, or, in the case of small animals, housed indoors.

Pinnipeds and polar bears have longer guard hairs forming the most visible fur; polar bears' guard hairs are hollow.

Some considerations in judging the quality of an animal's coat:

- Colour (coat colour other than those allowed in the breed standard results in disqualification)
- Markings (distribution of colour, spots, and patches; for example the spotted coat of a Dalmatian and the merle coat of an Australian Shepherd are distinctive; the markings of a terrier vary.)
- Pattern (specific, predictable markings; tabby, for example is a common pattern in cats)
- Texture of hair (smooth, rough, curly, straight, broken)
- Length of hair
- Health of hair coat (shiny or dull, brittle or flexible, etc.)

== See also ==
- Cat coat genetics for details about cat's coats
- Coat (dog) for details about dog's coats
- Equine coat color and Equine coat color genetics for information on the coats of horses
- Fur
