= Rosette (zoology) =

Rose-like markings on fur and skin

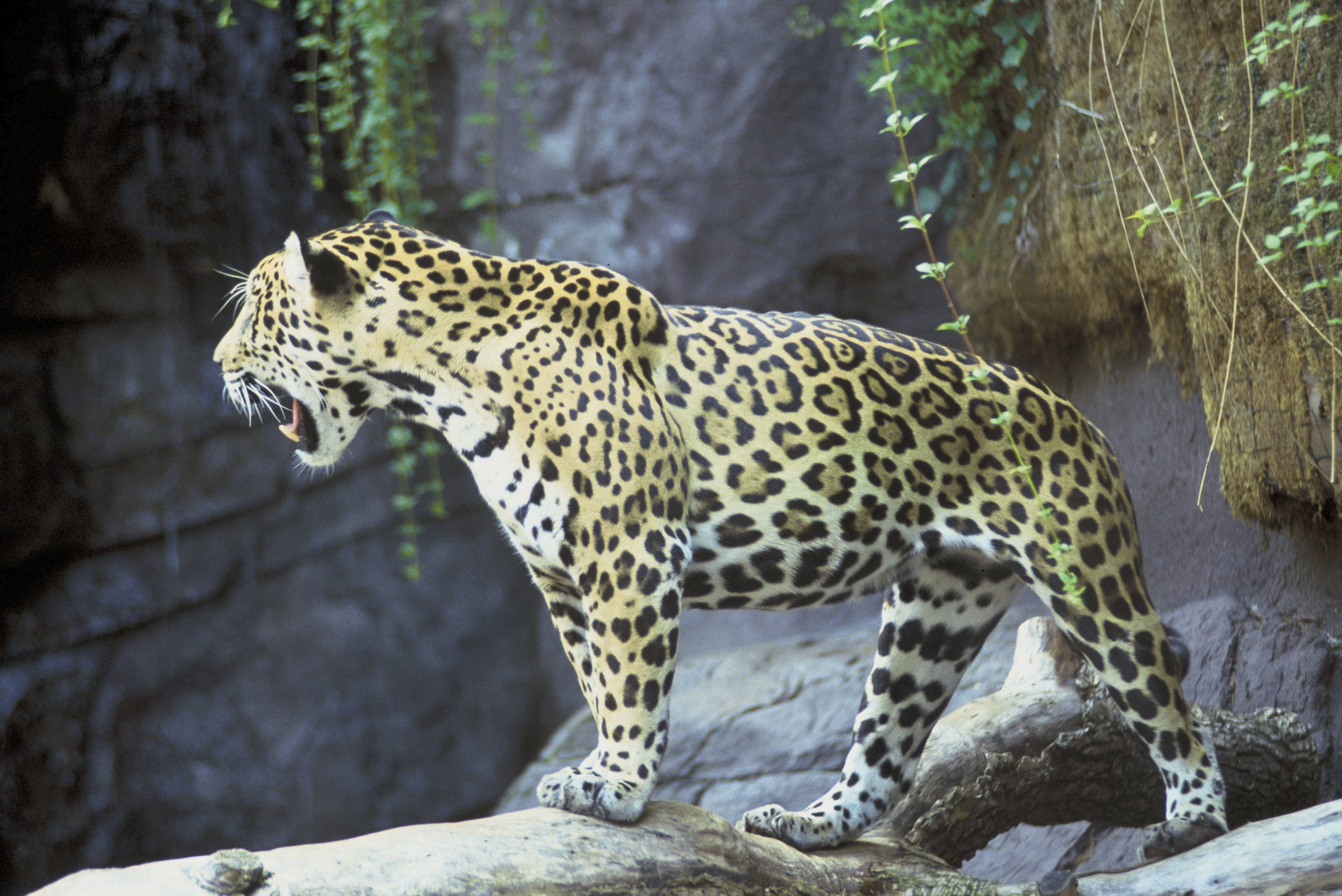
Rosettes of a jaguar

A rosette is a marking or formation shaped like a flower or blossom of a rose, found on the fur and skin of some animals, particularly cats.

== Functions of coat patterns ==
The main function of coat patterns in cats is thought to be camouflage, as their primary hunting strategies involve stalking, and hunts are typically more successful if initiated from a shorter distance. There are many different types of camouflage, but they all aid in hiding the animal from others.

For example, the white pelage with smoky grey and black rosette patterns of the snow leopard (Panthera uncia) make it well adapted to life in cold climates with bare rocks and patchy snow. The rosette patterns in the leopard (P. pardus) and jaguar (P. onca) likely reflect their habitation of wooded or forested ecosystems, which create dappled light environments where their high contrast markings obscure their body outline during ambush hunting.

== Formation ==
Coloration and patterning in mammals is most strongly influenced by an intricate process surrounding the regulation, migration, and differentiation of melanocytes, which are responsible for producing pigment in the skin and fur. The type of pigment produced by the melanocyte is mainly determined by interactions between the agouti signaling protein (ASIP) and α-melanocyte stimulating hormone (MSH) with the melanocortin-1 receptor (MC1R).

Species in the family Panthera have highly diverse coat patterns. This is a result of their ancestors diverging around 10 million years ago in the late Miocene. They migrated to different locations on Earth, causing them to encounter new environments and ecological pressures. As a result, they all faced different selective pressures, which caused certain evolved traits to be more advantageous than others. For the snow leopard, a lighter coloration helps them blend in with snow, and in the more shaded forests and jungles where leopards and jaguars live, darker rosettes help them blend in with shadows.

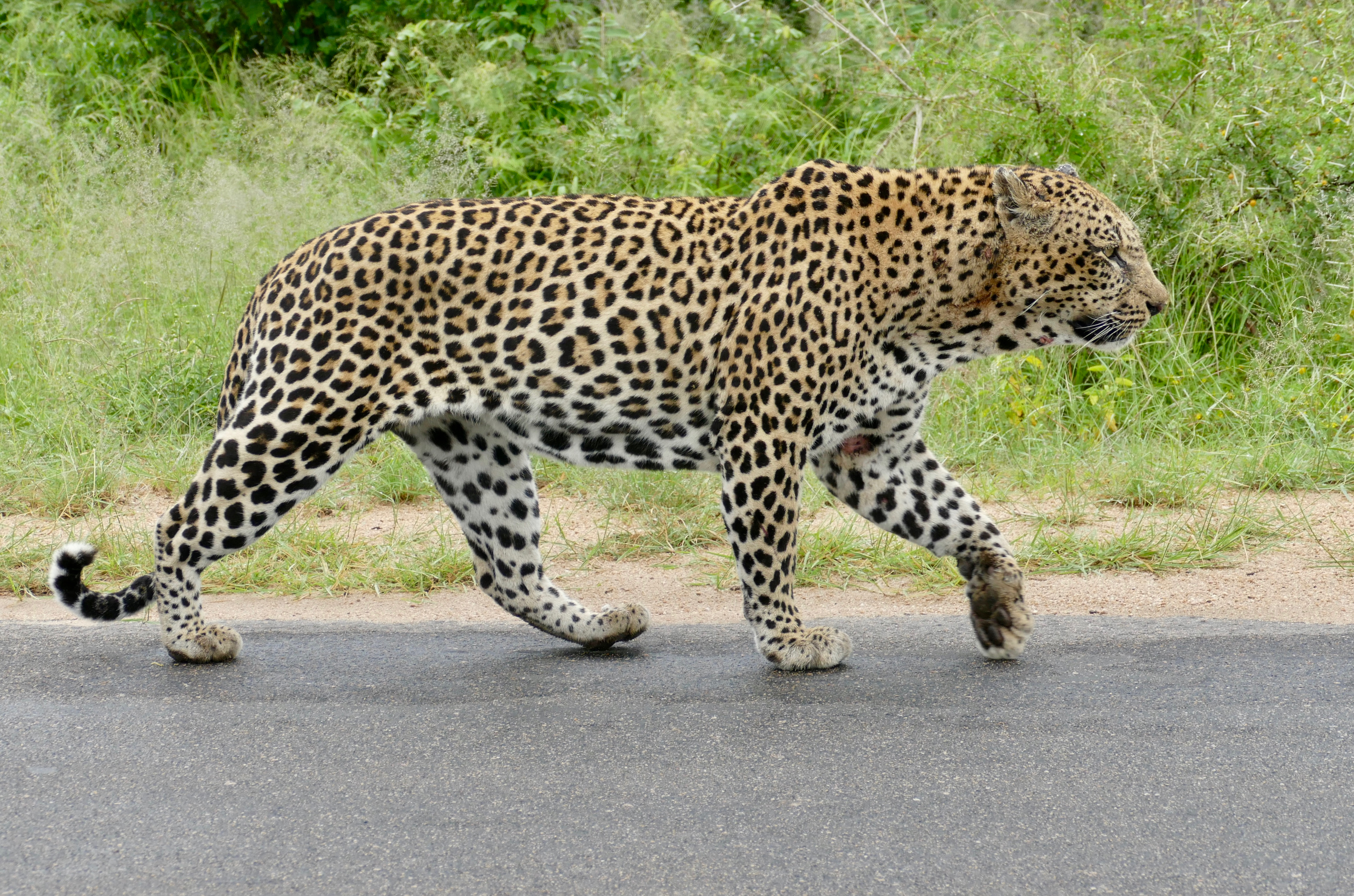
Leopard with rosette pattern displayed.

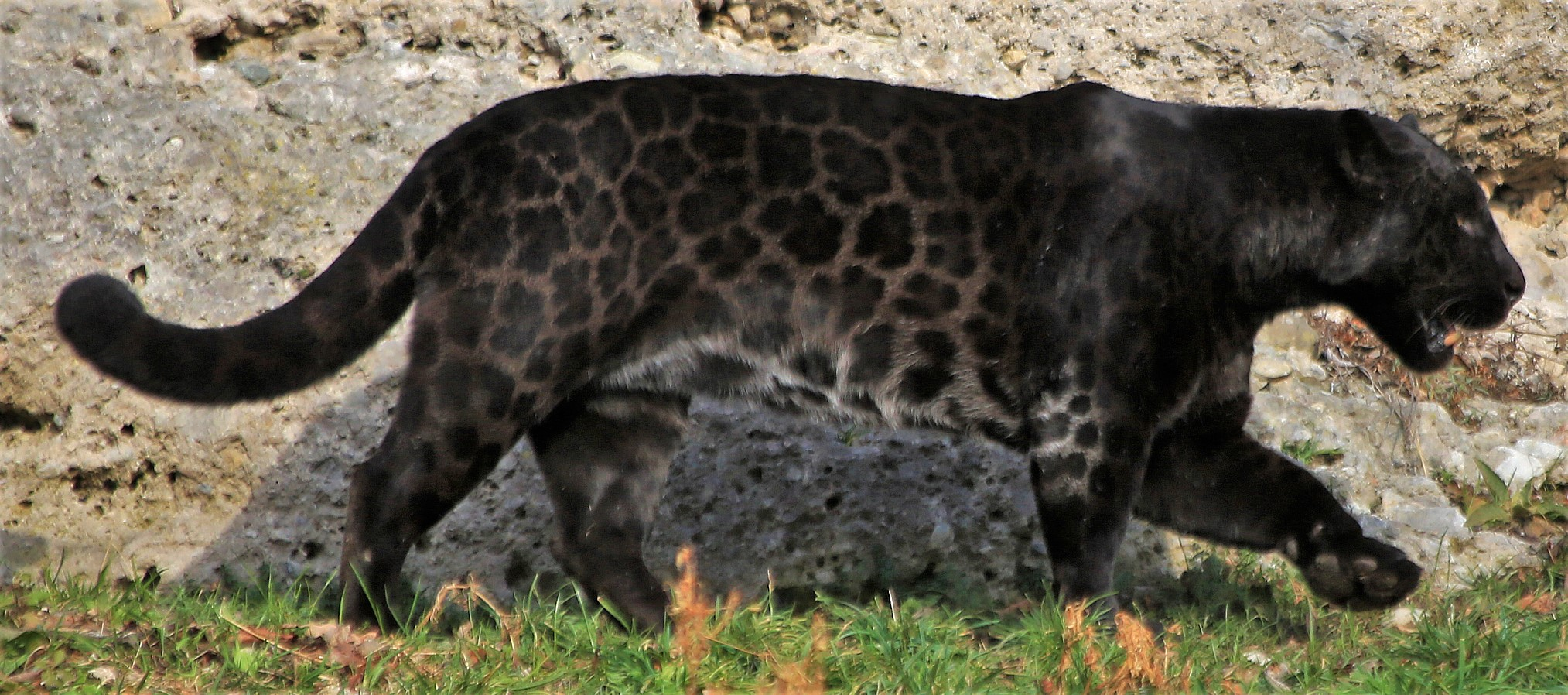
Dark coated jaguar with visible rosettes.

== Leopard ==
The leopard (Panthera pardus) has a wide variety of coat coloration. On each color variation, the leopard has rosette patterns on their backs, flanks, and limbs. They also have patterns that are considered to be spots and not rosettes on their heads, stomach, and limbs.

== Jaguar ==
Tan colored jaguar with rosettes displayed.

Like the leopard, the jaguar (Panthera onca) has a wide variety of coat coloration. The jaguar can have a coat in colors ranging from white to black with the most common residing in brownish yellow area. These big cats have rosettes on their bodies in random combination and pattern.

== Lion (cub) ==
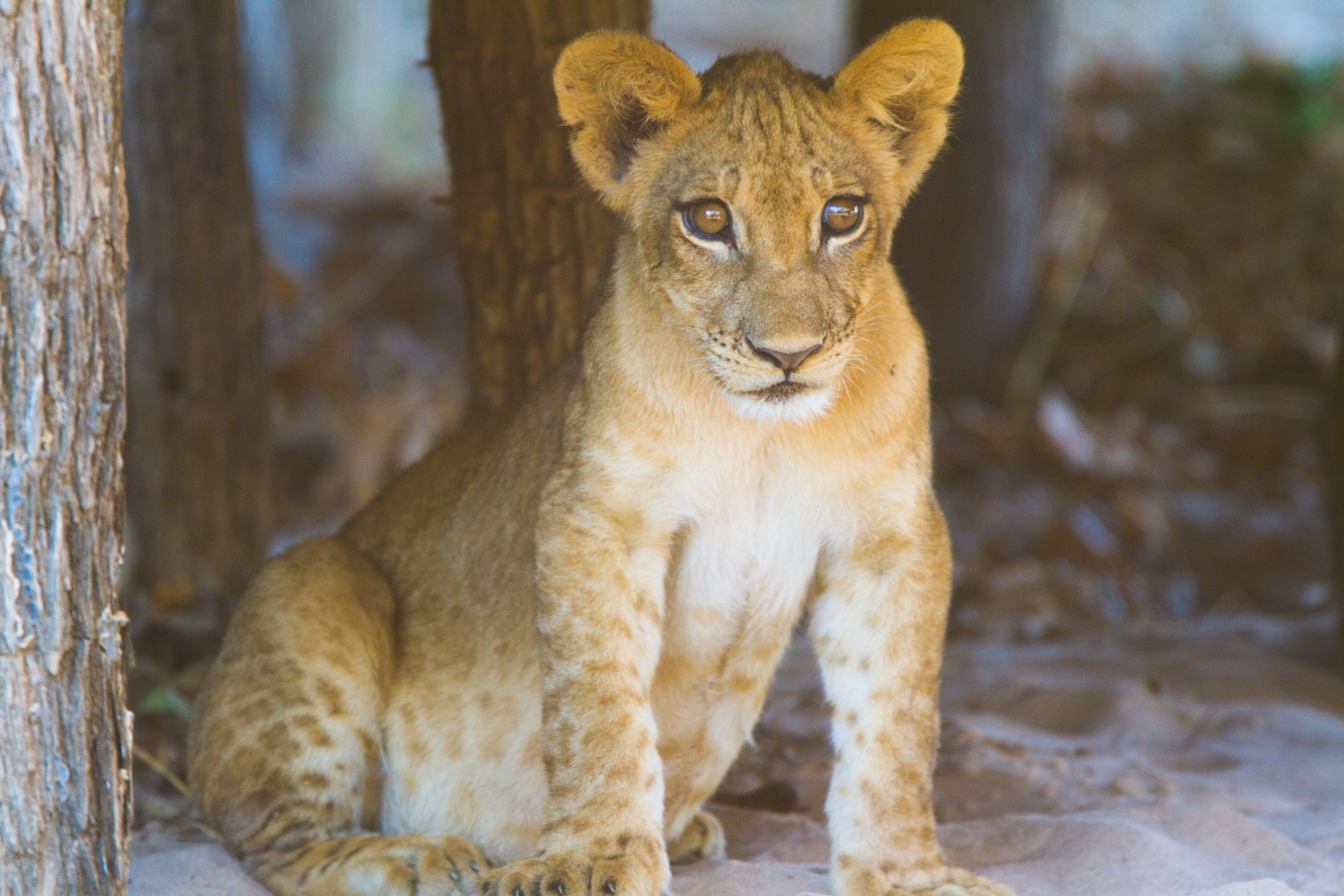
Lion cub with rosettes on both legs and abdomen.

Young lion (Panthera leo) cubs have rosette patterns on their legs and abdomen regions. These rosettes usually do not transfer into adulthood and fade as the cub ages. However, some mature lions may keep traces of their rosette patterns throughout life. For the lion cub, the rosette markings act as camouflage in long grasses and bushes.

== Bengal cat ==
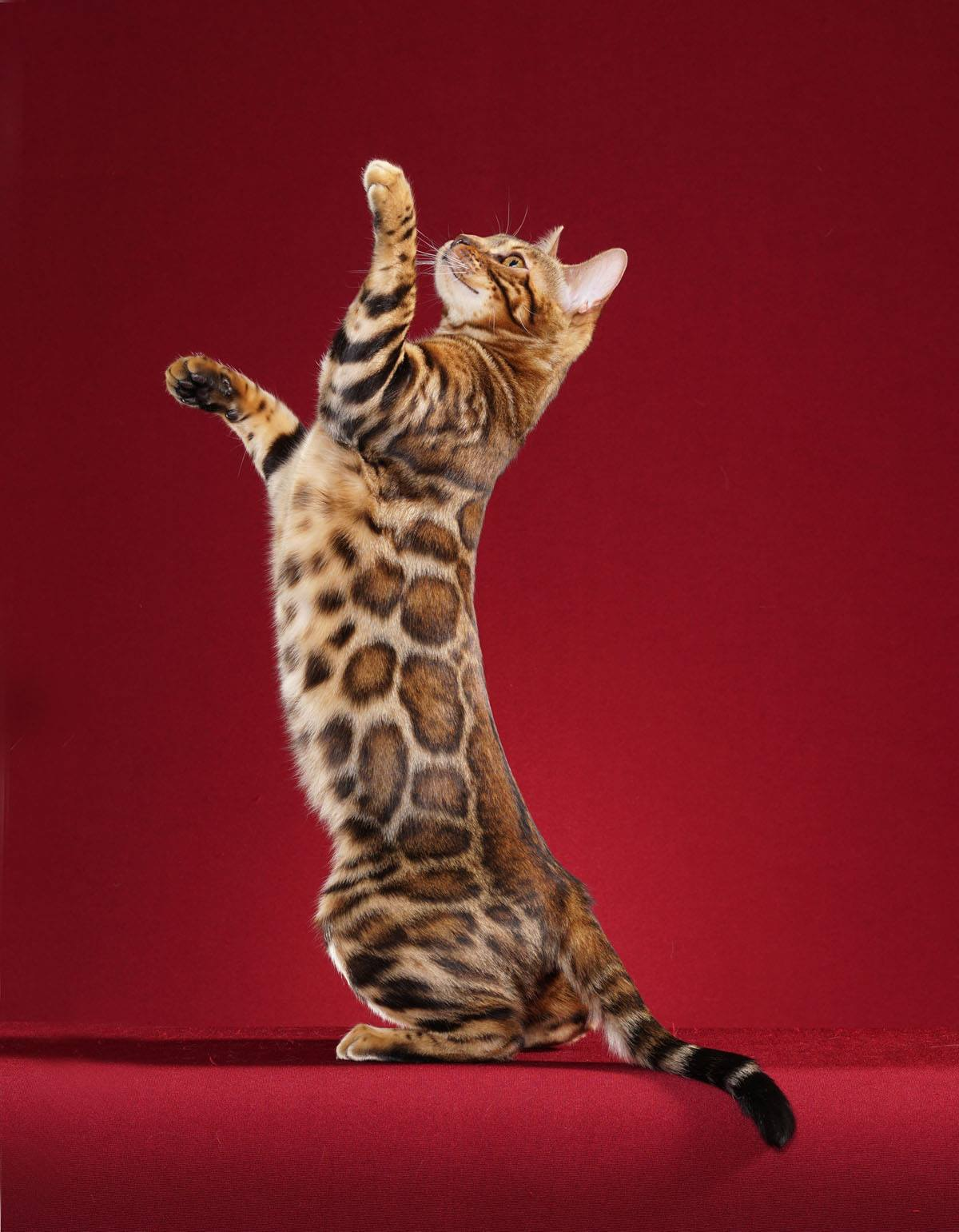
Bengal cat, rosettes seen in midsection.

The bengal cat (Felis catus x Prionailurus bengalensis) is a descendant from a combination of domestic cats and leopard cat lineage. This domesticated cat has a distinct coat pattern with a combination of rosettes, spots, and stripes.

== Cheetah ==
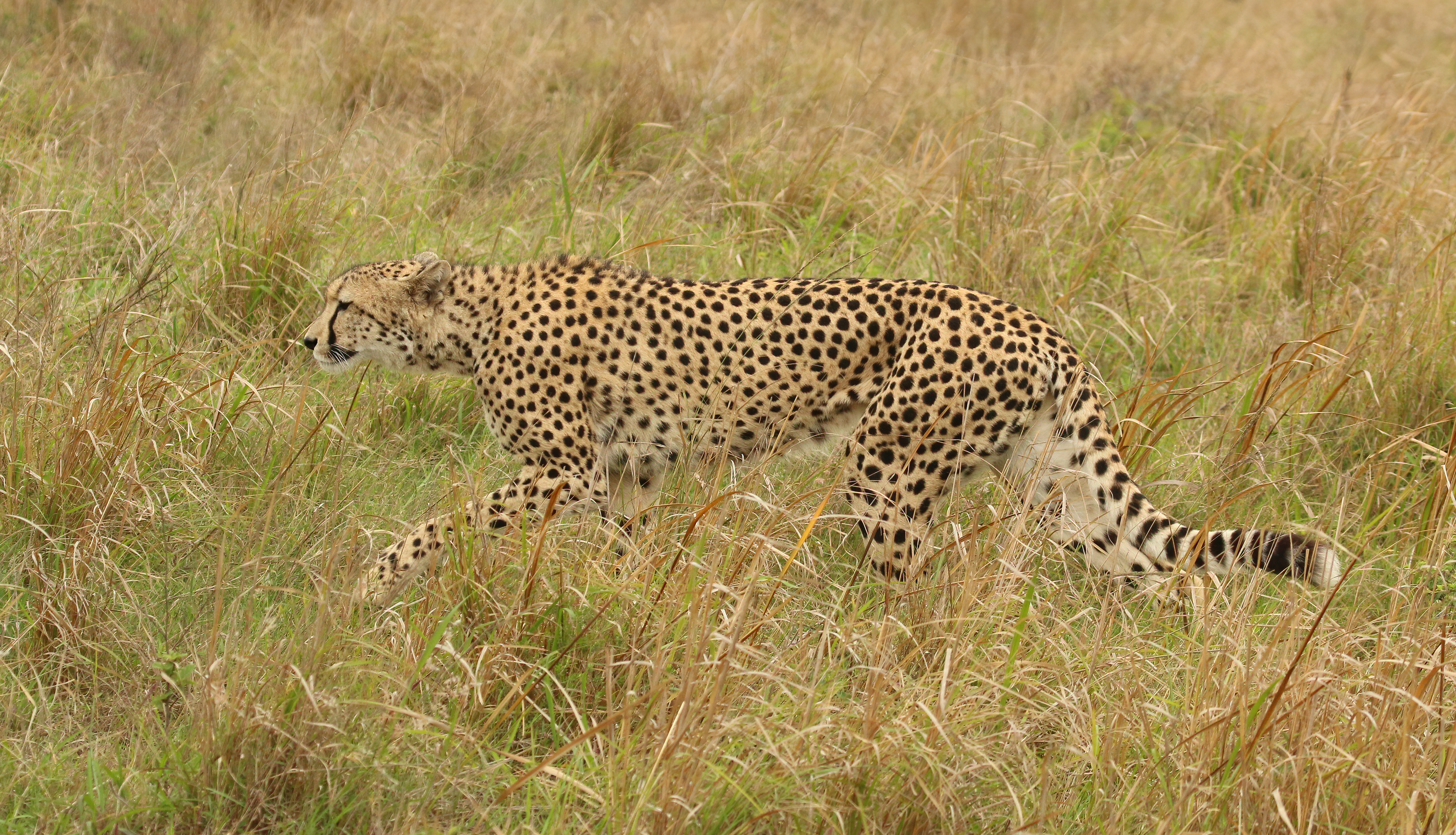
Cheetah with identifiable spots and no rosettes.

While individual cheetahs (Acinonyx jubatus) do have distinct and identifiable coat patterns like leopards or jaguars, the cheetah's patterns are considered to be spots, not rosettes.

== Ocelot ==
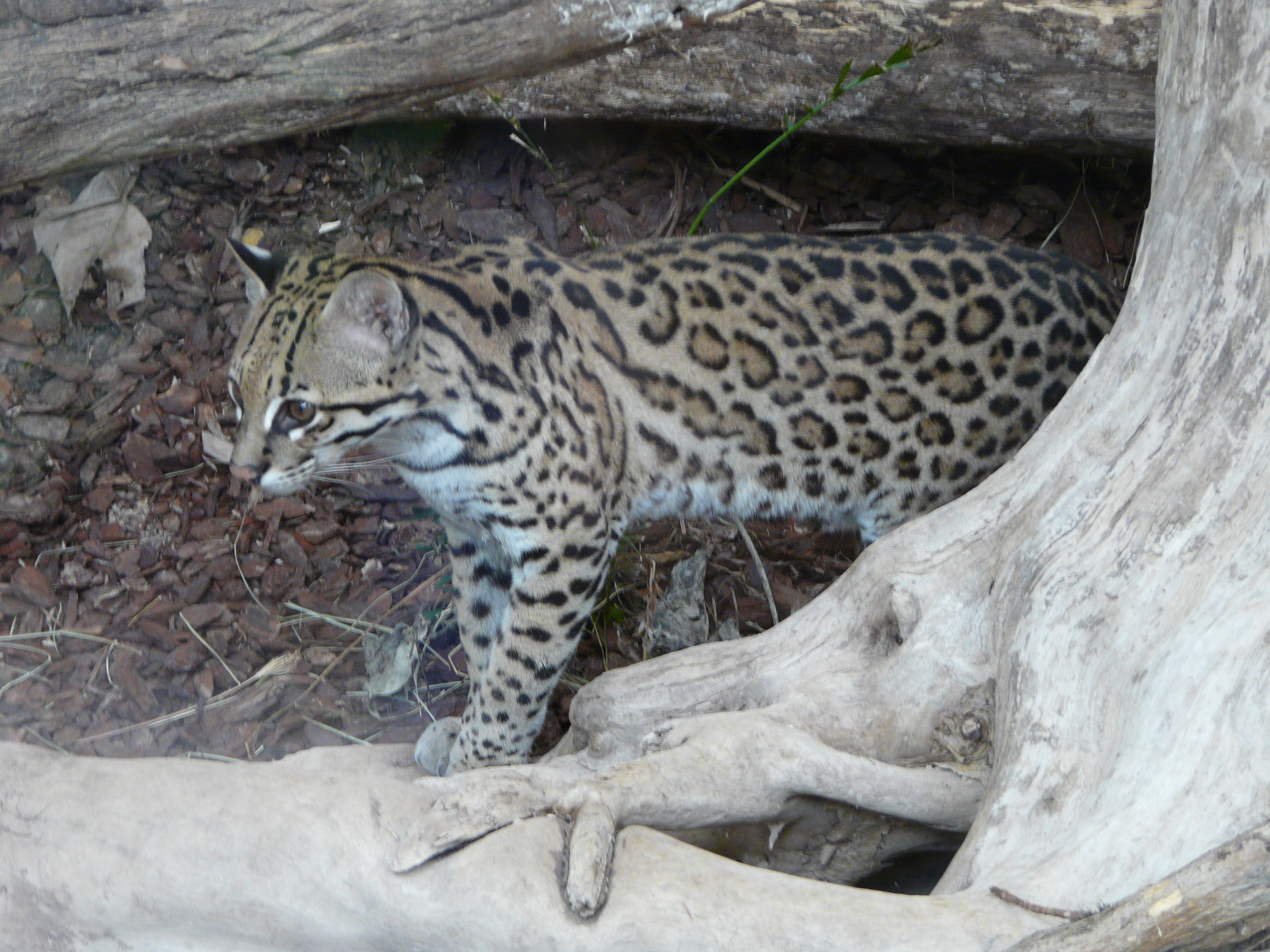
Ocelot, rosettes displayed on back and sides.

Ocelots (Leopardus pardalis) have a coat pattern that may look like rosettes, however is considered to be a combination of spots and stripes.

== List of felids with rosettes ==
- Bengal cat
- Jaguar
- Leopard – smaller, denser rosettes than the jaguar, lacking central spots
- Leopard cat
- Liger
- Liliger
- Lion – cubs have rosettes, which may be retained on the legs in adults
- Litigon
- Margay
- Ocelot
- Safari cat
- Snow leopard
- Tigon
- Tilcayo

== See also ==
- Leopard pattern
- Stripe (pattern)
