= Hybrid growth disorders =

Hybrid growth disorders refer to reduced growth or overgrowth in an organism that is a hybrid of two different species. In some sense, it is a type of hybrid dysgenesis when the growth disorder proves deleterious, making it the opposite of heterosis or hybrid vigour.

Hybrid growth disorders may be referred to as a growth dysplasia, especially when resulting in overgrowth, although this terminology may be confusing since the term dysplasia is commonly used to imply an impending cancer. However, a hybrid growth disorder is not caused by cancer.

Hybrid growth disorders are exhibited among a variety organisms, including ligers, tigons, hybrid mice, and hybrid dwarf hamsters.

A study on hybrid mice which investigated the possible causes for hybrid growth disorders reveals genomic imprinting to have a major effect. Paternal imprinting may increase growth to maximize maternal resources allocated to his progeny, while maternal imprinting may suppress growth in favor of ensuring her own survival and equal allocation of resources between offspring. This suggests that the extent of a disorder depends on the combination of parental species and their respective sexes, as demonstrated by the Vrana study. The study concludes that hybrid growth disorders most commonly affect the heterozygous sex, as expected by Haldane's rule. This would also explain why hybrid growth disorders often appear to affect one sex more than the other.

Similarly, a study of hybrids between dwarf hamster species Phodopus campbelli and Phodopus sungorus suggests that gene imprinting causes abnormal interactions between growth-promoting and growth-repressing genes which regulate placental and embryonic growth.

== See also ==
- F1 hybrid
