= Panthera hybrid =

Big cat crossbreed

A Panthera hybrid is a crossbreed between individuals of any of the five species of the genus Panthera: the tiger, lion, jaguar, leopard, and snow leopard. Most hybrids would not be perpetuated in the wild as the territories of the parental species do not overlap and the males are usually infertile. Mitochondrial genome research revealed that wild hybrids were also present in ancient times. The mitochondrial genomes of the snow leopard and the lion were more similar to each other than to other Panthera species, indicating that at some point in their history, the female hybrid progeny of male ancestors of modern snow leopards and female ancestors of modern lions interbred with male ancestors of modern snow leopards.

== History ==
In theory, lions and tigers can be matched in the wild and give offspring. In reality, there may be no natural born tigon or liger in the world, as lions and tigers are separated both geographically and by behavioral differences. In England, African lions and Asian tigresses have been successfully mated, and three lion-tiger hybrid cubs were born in Windsor in 1824, which is probably the earliest record of captive-bred ligers. The three cubs were then presented to George IV.

== Naming of hybrids ==
Panthera hybrids are typically given a portmanteau name, varying by which species is the sire (male parent) and which is the dam (female parent). For example, a hybrid between a lion and a tigress is a liger, because the lion is the male parent and the tigress is the female parent.

== Jaguar and leopard hybrids ==
A jagupard is the hybrid of a male jaguar and a female leopard. A single rosetted female jagupard was produced at a zoo in Chicago, United States. Jaguar-leopard hybrids bred at Hellbrun Zoo, Salzburg were described as jagupards, which conforms to the usual portmanteau naming convention.

A leguar or lepjag is the hybrid of a male leopard and a female jaguar. The terms jagulep and lepjag are often used interchangeably, regardless of which animal was the sire. Numerous lepjags have been bred as animal actors, as they are more tractable than jaguars.

The 19th century zoologist A.D. Bartlett stated: "I have, more than once, met with instances of the male jaguar (P. onca) breeding with a female leopard (P. pardus). These hybrids were also reared recently in Wombell's well-known travelling collection. I have seen some animals of this kind bred, between a male black jaguar and a female Indian leopard:-the young partook strongly of the male, being almost black."

In Barnabos Menagerie (in Spain), a jaguar gave birth to two cubs from a union with a black leopard; one resembled the dam, but was somewhat darker, while the other was black with the rosettes of the dam showing. Since melanism in the panther (leopard) is recessive, the jaguar would have had to have been black, or be a jaguar-black leopard hybrid itself, carrying the recessive gene. Scherren continued, "The same cross, but with the sexes reversed, was noted, by Professor Sacc (F) of Barcelona Zoo (Zoolog. Gart., 1863, 88). "The cub, a female, was grey. She is said to have produced two cubs to her sire; one like a jaguar, the other like the dam. Herr Rorig expressed his regret that the account of the last two cases mentioned lacked fullness and precision."

Female jaguleps or lepjags are fertile, and when one is mated to a male lion, the offspring are referred to as lijaguleps. One such complex hybrid was exhibited in the early 1900s as a "Congolese spotted lion", hinting at some exotic African beast, rather than a human-made hybrid.

== Jaguar and lion hybrids ==
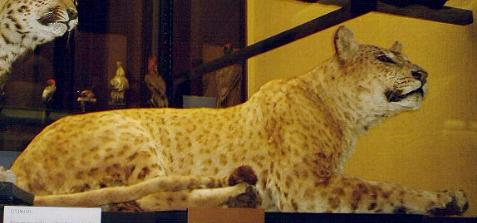
Jaguar/lion hybrid, Rothschild Museum, Tring

Tsunami in an undated photograph

A jaglion or jaguon is the offspring between a male jaguar and a female lion (lioness). A mounted specimen is on display at the Walter Rothschild Zoological Museum, Hertfordshire, England. It has the lion's background color, brown, jaguar-like rosettes and the powerful build of the jaguar.

On April 09, 2006, two jaglions were born at Bear Creek degree 5 Wildlife Sanctuary, Barrie (north of Toronto), Ontario, Canada. Jahzara (female) and Tsunami (male) were the result of an unintended mating between a black jaguar called Diablo and a lioness called Lola, which had been hand-raised together and were inseparable. They were kept apart when Lola came into oestrus. Tsunami is spotted, but Jahzara is a melanistic jaglion due to inheriting the jaguar's dominant melanism gene. It was not previously known how the jaguar's dominant melanism gene would interact with lion coloration genes.

Tsunami died in October 2022.

A liguar is an offspring of a male lion and a female jaguar.

When the fertile offspring of a male lion and female jaguar mates with a leopard, the resulting offspring is referred to as a leoliguar.

== Jaguar and tiger hybrids ==
A tiguar is an offspring of a male tiger and a female jaguar. Reportedly, at the Altiplano Zoo in the city of San Pablo Apetatitlán (near Tlaxcala City, Mexico), the crossbreeding of a male Siberian tiger and a female jaguar from the southern Lacandon Jungle produced a male tiguar named Mickey. Mickey was on exhibition at a 400 m^{2} habitat and as of June 2009, was two years old and weighed 180 kg (400 lb). Attempts to verify this report have been bolstered by recent images purported to show the adult Mickey (see External links section). There has been no report of the birth of a hybrid from a male jaguar and female tiger, which would be termed a "jagger".

There is a claimed sighting of a lion × black jaguar cross (male) and a tiger × black jaguar cross (female) loose in Maui, Hawaii. There are no authenticated tiger/jaguar hybrids and the description matches that of a liger. The alleged tiger × black jaguar was large, relatively long-necked (probably due to lack of a ruff or mane) with both stripes and "jaguar-like" rosettes on its sides. The assertion of hybrid identity was due to the combination of black, dark brown, light brown, dark orange, dark yellow and beige markings and the tiger-like stripes radiating from its face. It is more likely to have been a released liger, since these are very large and have a mix of rosettes (lion juvenile markings) and stripes and can have a brindled mix of colors exactly as described (their markings are extremely variable).

== Leopard and lion hybrids ==
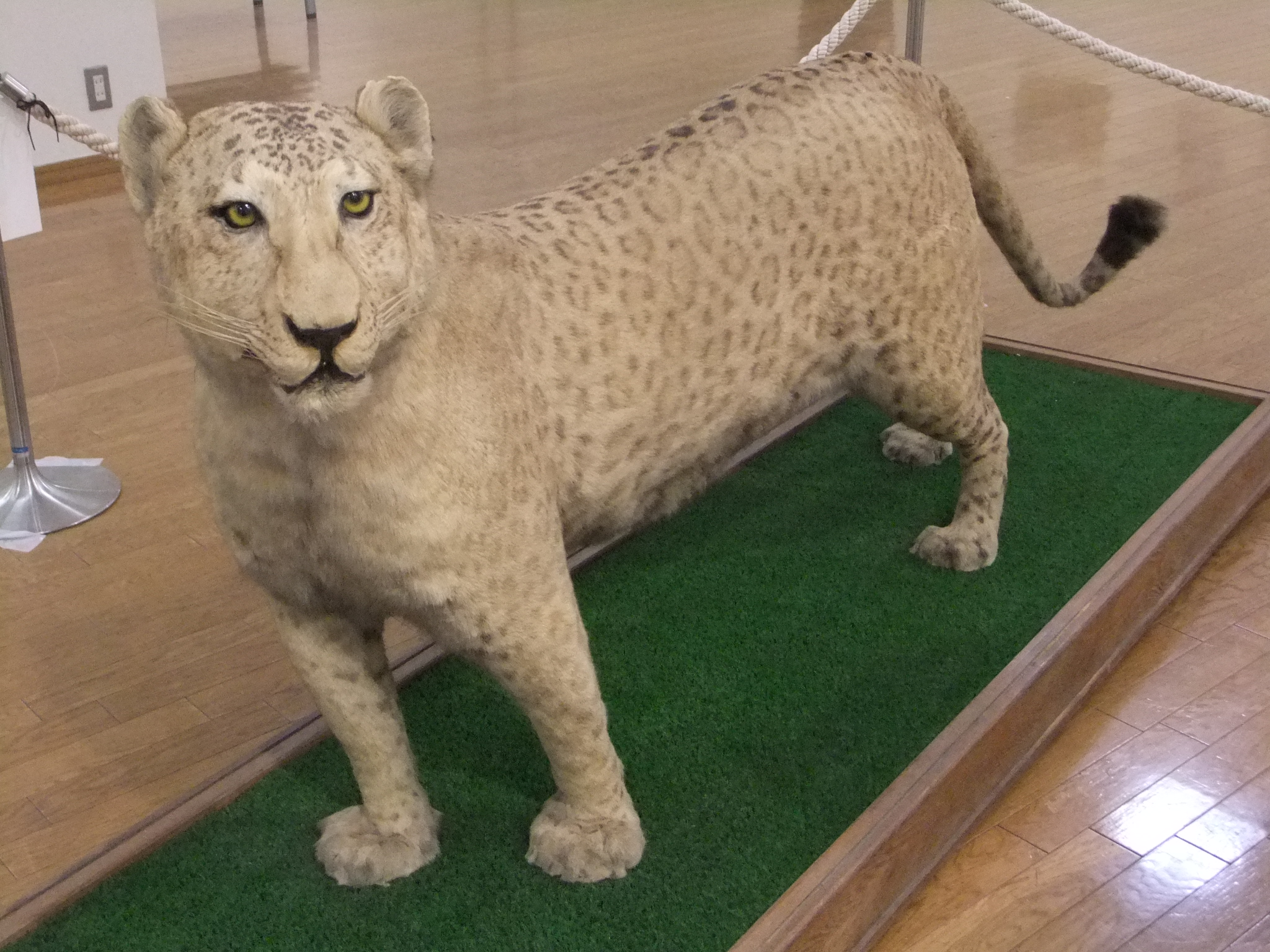
Taxidermy leopon

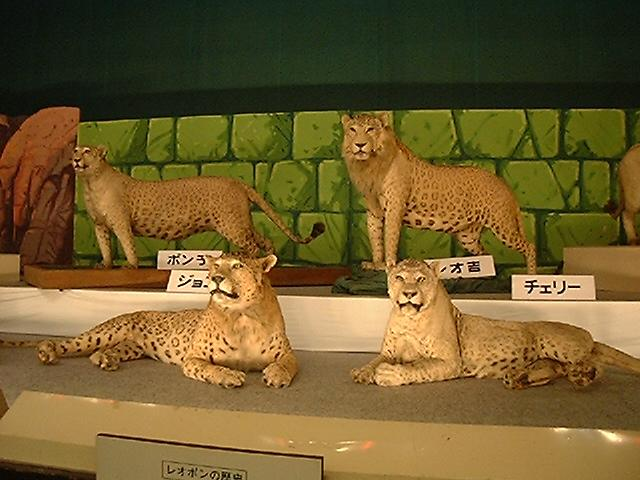
A group of taxidermied leopons

A leopon is the result of breeding a leopard and a lioness. They occur only in captivity.

The first documented leopon was bred at Kolhapur, India, in 1910. Its skin was sent to Reginald Innes Pocock by Walter Samuel Millard, the Secretary of the Bombay Natural History Society. It was a cross between a large leopard and a lioness. Two cubs were born, one of which died aged 2.5 months, and the other was still living when Pocock described it in 1912. Pocock wrote that it was spotted like a leopard, but that the spots on its sides were smaller and closer set than those of an Indian leopard and were brown and indistinct, like the fading spots of a juvenile lion. The spots on the head, spine, belly and legs were black and distinct. The tail was spotted on the topside and striped underneath and had a blackish tip with longer hairs. The underside was dirty white, the ears were fawn and had a broad black bar, but did not have the white spot found in leopards.

Another lion-leopardess hybrid was born in Florence, Italy called lionard or lipard (/ˈlaɪpəd/ or /ˈlaɪpərd/).

== Leopard and tiger hybrids ==
The name dogla is a native Indian name used for a supposedly natural hybrid offspring of a male leopard and a female tiger (tigress). Indian folklore claims that large male leopards sometimes mate with tigresses, and anecdotal evidence exists in India of offspring resulting from leopard to tigress matings. A supposed dogla was reported in the early 1900s.

Tiger-leopardess hybrids have supposedly appeared many times. Frederick Codrington Hicks recorded that the weight of these creatures varied from 50 pounds to the weight of a tigress. In addition, in September 1965, a "leoger" skin was supposedly put on sale. There are some more documentations of this hybrid, but most of them are just of strange-looking skins that could also be attributed to genetic mutations. Most of these reports are probably hoaxes or misinterpretations, which makes it hard for scientists to learn about tiger-leopardess hybrids, but at least a part of the claims are true or in part true, such as the ones made by Frederick Codrington Hicks.

K Sankhala's book Tiger refers to large, troublesome leopards as adhabaghera, which he translated as "bastard", and suggests a leopard/tiger hybrid (the reverse hybrid is unlikely to arise in the wild state, as a wild male tiger would probably kill rather than mate with a female leopard). Sankhala noted there was a belief amongst local people that leopards and tigers naturally hybridise.

From "The Tiger, Symbol Of Freedom", edited by Nicholas Courtney: "Rare reports have been made of tigresses mating with leopards in the wild. There has even been an account of the sighting of rosettes; the stripes of the tiger being most prominent in the body. The animal was a male measuring a little over eight feet [2.44 m]." This is the same description as given by Hicks.

The 1951 book Mammalian Hybrids reported tiger/leopard matings were infertile, producing spontaneously aborted "walnut-sized fetuses".

A tigard is the hybrid offspring of a tiger and a leopardess. The only known attempts to mate the two have produced stillborns.

In 1900, Carl Hagenbeck crossed a female leopard with a Bengal tiger. The stillborn offspring had a mixture of spots, rosettes and stripes. Henry Scherren wrote, "A male tiger from Penang served two female Indian leopards, and twice with success. Details are not given and the story concludes somewhat lamely. 'The leopardess dropped her cubs prematurely, the embryos were in the first stage of development and were scarcely as big as young mice.' Of the second leopardess there is no mention."

== Lion and tiger hybrids ==
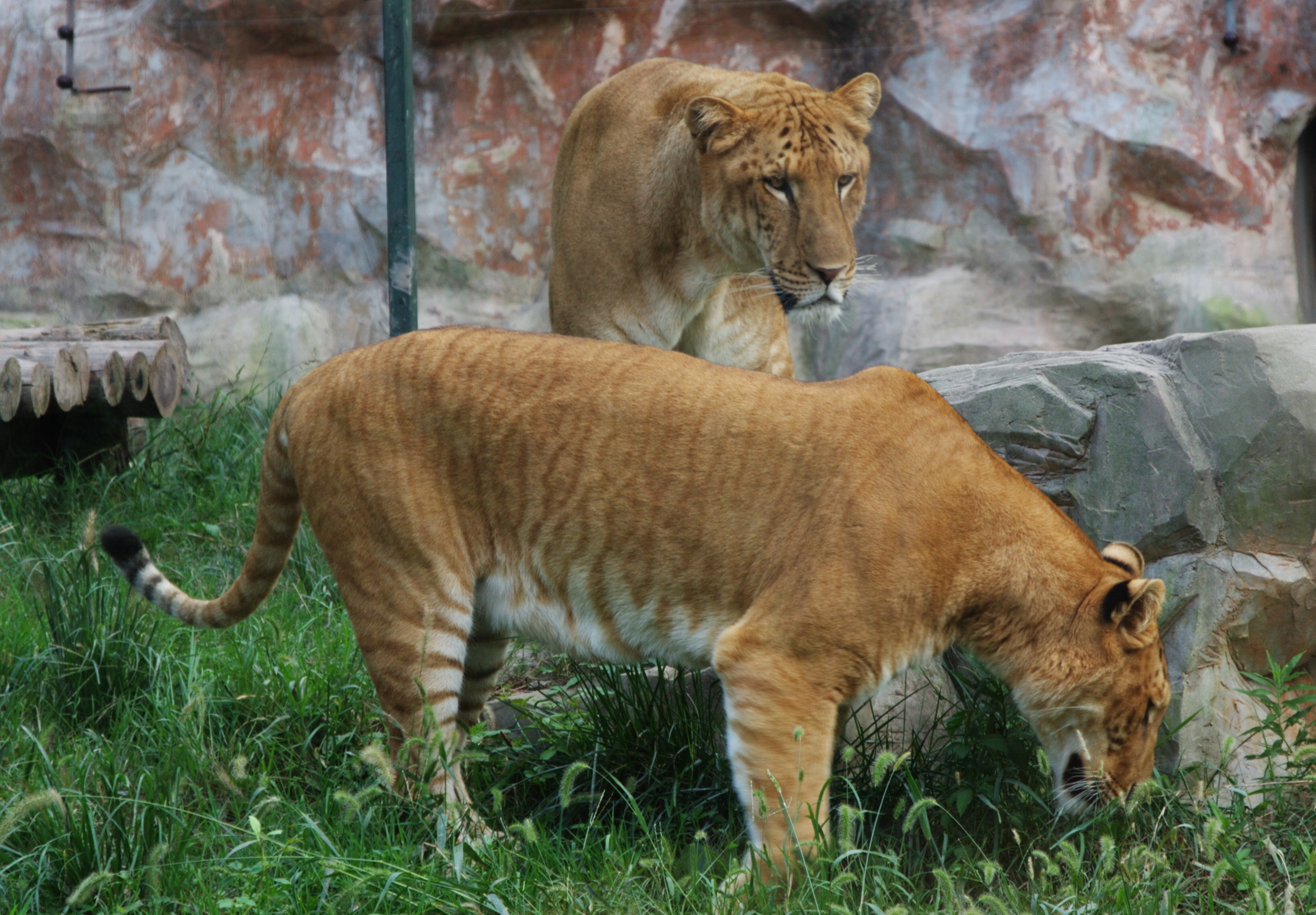
Liger

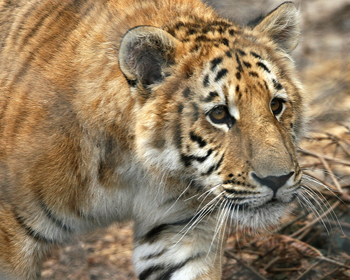
Tiliger cross of (Panthera leo x Panthera tigris) x Panthera tigris at Tigerworld Animal Sanctuary, North Carolina

The hybrids resulting from crossbreeding between lions and tigers are known as tigon (/ˈtaɪɡən/) and liger (/ˈlaɪɡər/). The second generation hybrids of liger or tigon are known as liliger, tiliger, litigon and titigon. The tigon (Panthera tigris X leo), also known as tiglon (/ˈtaɪɡlən/) is an offspring of a male tiger (Panthera tigris) and a female lion (Panthera leo). A liger is distinct from tigon (Panthera leo X tigris), as a hybrid of female tiger and male lion.

Professor Valentine Bail conducted a long observation and recording of some lion-tiger hybrids, those lion-tiger are owned by Mr. Atkins and his zoo:

| | Date of birth | place of birth | number of cubs | number of male cubs | number of female cubs | longevity |
|---|---|---|---|---|---|---|
| first record | October 24, 1824 | Windsor | 3 | 2 | 1 | 1 year |
| second record | April 22, 1825 | Clapham Common | 3 | not recorded | not recorded | short time |
| third record | December 31, 1826 | Edinburgh | 3 | 1 | 2 | a few months |
| fourth record | October 2, 1828 | Windsor | 3 | 1 | 2 | not recorded |
| fifth record | May, 1831 | Kensington | 3 | not recorded | not recorded | not recorded |
| sixth record | July 19, 1833 | Liverpool | 3 | 1 | 2 | 10 years |

The early record lion-tiger hybrid was mainly tigons, in At Home In The Zoo (1961), Gerald Iles wrote "For the record I must say that I have never seen a liger, a hybrid obtained by crossing a lion with a tigress. They seem to be even rarer than tigons."

=== Examples ===
Liger
A liger is the offspring between a male lion and a female tiger, which is larger than its parents because the lion has a growth maximizing gene and the tigress, unlike the lioness, has no growth inhibiting gene.
Tigon
A tigon is the offspring of a female lion and a male tiger. The tigon is not as common as the converse hybrid, the liger. Contrary to some beliefs, the tigon ends up smaller than either parent, because male tigers and lionesses have a growth inhibitor. In the late 19th and early 20th centuries, tigons were more common than ligers.
Liliger
A liliger is a hybridization from a lion and a liger (panthera hybrid). The hybridization of a tiger (panthera tigris) and a lion (pantera leo) already has a high likelihood of infertility but in 2012 in a Russian zoo, a hybrid of a lion and liger (panthera hybridization), Kiara the cub, was born. The likelihood for this occurrence is the male ligers or (panthera hybrid) are not able to fertilize however, female ligers retain the potential to reproduce.
Litigon
Rudrani, a tigoness from the Alipore Zoo, mated with Debabrata, a male lion, and gave birth to three litigons. Only one litigon cub, named Cubanacan, survived.
Tiliger
A tiliger is the offspring of a male tiger and a ligress.. In 2008 a tiliger named Radar was born in Florida and was transferred to Tigerworld Animal Sanctuary in Rockwell, North Carolina at 15 weeks old. Radar's parents are a male tiger and a female liger.
Titigon
A titigon is the offspring of a male tiger and a tigoness.

=== Growth and size ===
Ligers are typically larger and heavier than other existing felids. Some biologists believe that their gigantism results from the lack of certain genes that limit the growth of lions. The male lion's genes tend to maximize the growth of its progeny, as the larger size represents greater competitiveness. In order to control the size of the offspring within a certain range, the growth-inhibiting gene of the lioness will offset the growth-maximizing gene of the male lion. The genes of a female tiger, however, are not adapted to limiting growth, which allows ligers to grow far larger and heavier than either parent. In general, most ligers grow more than 3.3 m (10 ft 10 in) in length and weigh more than 400 kg (880 lb). According to the Guinness World Records (through 2013), the world's largest felid was the adult male liger, Hercules, from Myrtle Beach Safari, a wildlife reserve in South Carolina, US. He was measured at 3.33 m (10 ft 11 in) (standing 1.25 m (4 ft 1 in) at the shoulder) and weighed at 418.2 kg (922 lb). Hercules eats approximately 13.6 kg (30 lb) of meat and drinks several liters of water per day.

Tigons are a cross between a male tiger and a female lion. The presence of growth-minimizing genes from the lioness causes them to be smaller than either of their parent species; they weigh less than 150 kg (330 lb). Tigons also have growth dysplasia (however, inversely). A tigon is approximately twice as light as liger.

=== Appearance ===
Ligers and tigons look similar to their parents, only bigger or smaller. Their teeth are about two inches long. They have the genetic components of tigers and lions; therefore, they may be very similar to their parent species and can be difficult to identify. Their coloring ranges from gold to brown to white, and they may have spots or stripes. Adult male ligers usually have smaller manes than male lions.

=== Longevity ===
A liger called Samson died at the age of thirteen in 2006. Shasta, a female liger, was born in the Hogle Zoo in Salt Lake City in 1948, and died in 1972. She lived for 24 years. Many claim that ligers are short-lived, but according to the survey, such a conclusion is still uncertain. A male tigon owned by Atkins born on July 19, 1833, lived for 10 years.

=== Fertility ===
Guggisberg said ligers and tigons were thought to be invariably sterile. The first hybrid of a hybrid, a cub mothered by a liger, was discovered at the Munich-Hellabrunn Zoo in 1943. The birth of a second generation of hybrids proved that the biologists were wrong about tigons' and ligers' fertility; it now seems that only male lion-tiger hybrids are sterile.

== Zoo animals ==
By 2017, roughly more than 100 ligers were thought to exist; however, only a few tigons still exist, as they are more difficult to breed. Moreover, ligers are more likely to attract tourists, so zoos prefer to breed ligers as opposed to tigons. Some zoos claim they breed ligers or tigons for conservation, but opponents believe that it is meaningless to preserve hybrids that do not exist in the wild.

== See also ==
- Felid hybrid
- Marozi
- Pumapard
