= Carl Louis Schwendler =

German electrician (1838–1882)

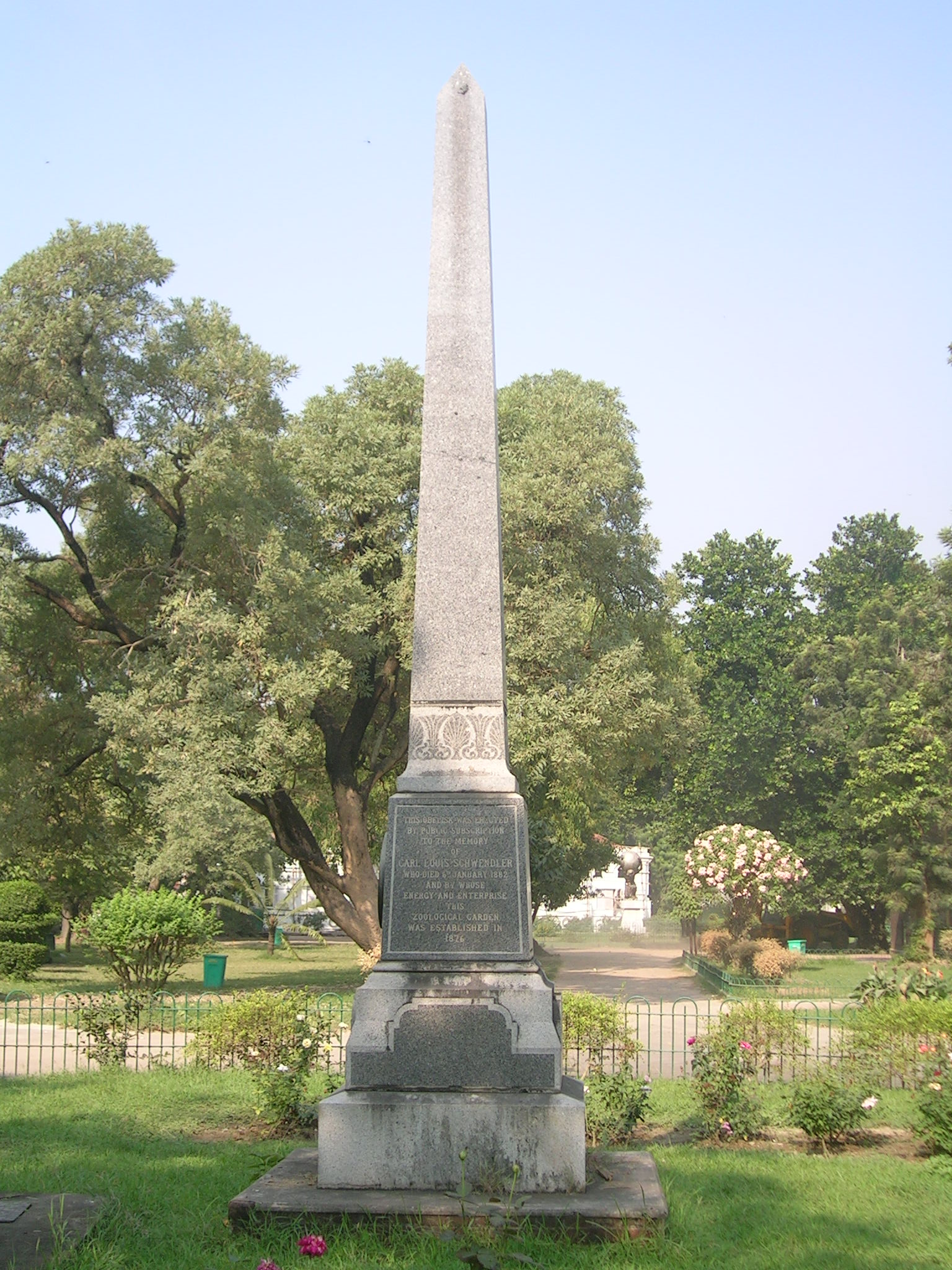
Memorial to Carl Schwendler at the Alipore Zoological Gardens

Carl Louis Schwendler (1838–1882) was a German electrician and one of the first proponents of the tungsten based incandescent light bulb. He also published an influential textbook on telegraphs, and worked in British India at a senior post in the Telegraph Department. He was involved in setting up telegraphic communication between Agra and Calcutta solving problems in transmission of submerged cables. He was commissioned by the Railways to perform a feasibility study of lighting Indian Railways stations by electric lamp.

Schwendler was a member of the Asiatic Society of Bengal. In 1867 a zoo was proposed by Joseph Fayrer and the idea was again raised by Schwendler in 1873. He helped in the setting up of this garden and offered his small menagerie (prior to his leaving India) to create the nucleus of the Alipore Zoological Gardens in Kolkata. The Zoological Gardens were formally inaugurated on 1 January 1876 by the Prince of Wales (King Edward VII) and opened to the public in May with Schwendler as its first superintendent assisted by Ram Brahma Sanyal. This zoo became in 1875 the home of Robert Clive's tortoise, Adwaita, thought to be the longest-living animal in the world when he died in 2006 at an estimated age of 255. A memorial to Schwendler was erected at the zoo premises in 1883.
