= Liger =

- Female (left) and male ligers at Everland amusement park in South Korea

Scientific classification
- Kingdom: Animalia
- Phylum: Chordata
- Class: Mammalia
- Order: Carnivora
- Family: Felidae
- Subfamily: Pantherinae
- Genus: Panthera
- Species: P. leo♂ × P. tigris♀

Lion and tigress hybrid

The liger is a hybrid offspring of a male lion (Panthera leo) and a tigress, or female tiger (Panthera tigris). The liger has parents in the same genus but of different species. The liger is distinct from the opposite hybrid called the tigon (of a male tiger and a lioness), and is the largest of all known extant felids. They enjoy swimming, which is a characteristic of tigers, and are very sociable like lions. Notably, ligers typically grow larger than either parent species, unlike tigons.

== History ==
The history of lion–tiger hybrids dates to at least the early 19th century in India. In 1798, Étienne Geoffroy Saint-Hilaire (1772–1844) made a colour plate of the offspring of a lion and a tiger. The name "liger", a portmanteau of lion and tiger, was coined by the 1930s. "Ligress" is used to refer to a female liger, on the model of "tigress".

In 1825, G. B. Whittaker made an engraving of liger cubs born in 1824. The parents and their three liger offspring are also depicted with their trainer in a 19th-century painting in the naïve style.

Two liger cubs born in 1837 were exhibited to King William IV and to his successor Queen Victoria. On 14 December 1900 and on 31 May 1901, Carl Hagenbeck wrote to zoologist James Cossar Ewart with details and photographs of ligers born at the Hagenbeck's Tierpark in Hamburg in 1897.

In Animal Life and the World of Nature (1902–1903), A. H. Bryden described Hagenbeck's "lion-tiger" hybrids:

It has remained for one of the most enterprising collectors and naturalists of our time, Mr. Carl Hagenbeck, not only to breed but to bring successfully to a healthy maturity, specimens of this rare alliance between those two great and formidable Felidae, the lion and tiger. The illustrations will indicate sufficiently how fortunate Mr. Hagenbeck has been in his efforts to produce these hybrids. The oldest and biggest of the animals shown is a hybrid born on the 11th May 1897. This fine beast, now more than five years old, equals and even excels in his proportions a well-grown lion, measuring as he does from nose tip to tail 10 ft 2 inches in length, and standing only three inches less than 4 ft at the shoulder. A good big lion will weigh about 400 lb [...] the hybrid in question, weighing as it does no less than 467 lb, is certainly the superior of the most well-grown lions, whether wild-bred or born in a menagerie. This animal shows faint striping and mottling, and, in its characteristics, exhibits strong traces of both its parents. It has a somewhat lion-like head, and the tail is more like that of a lion than of a tiger. On the other hand, it has no trace of mane. It is a huge and very powerful beast.

In 1935, four ligers from two litters were reared in the Zoological Gardens of Bloemfontein, South Africa. Three of them, a male and two females, were still living in 1953. The male weighed 340 kg (750 lb) and stood a foot and a half (45 cm) taller than a full-grown male lion at the shoulder.

In 1948, LIFE magazine pictured "Shasta," a liger conceived and born at the Hogle Zoo in Salt Lake City; its (future) parents had been rubbing noses through adjoining cage bars, and were permitted to cohabitate. The two-pound cub was "almost completely neglected by its mother, but the zoo's superintendent took it home and raised it, eventually returning it to the Zoo in a cage across from its parents' (separate) cages.

Although ligers are more commonly found than tigons today, in At Home in the Zoo (1961), Gerald Iles wrote "For the record I must say that I have never seen a liger, a hybrid obtained by crossing a lion with a tigress. They seem to be even rarer than tigons."

== Appearance ==
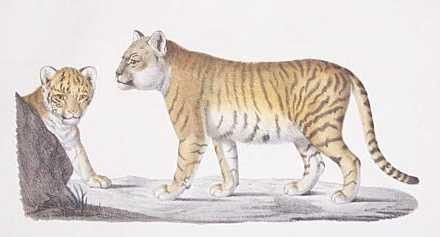
Color plate of the offspring of a lion and tiger, Étienne Geoffroy Saint-Hilaire

The liger has a faint tiger-like striped pattern upon a lion-like tawny background. In addition, it may inherit rosettes from the lion parent (lion cubs are rosetted and some adults retain faint markings). These markings may be black, dark brown, or sandy. The background color may be correspondingly tawny, sandy, or golden. In common with tigers, as an example of countershading, the underparts are pale. The specific pattern and color depend upon which subspecies the parents were and how the genes interact in the offspring.

White tigers have been crossed with lions to produce "white" (actually pale golden) ligers. In theory, white tigers could be crossed with white lions to produce white, very pale, or even stripeless ligers. There are no black ligers. Very few melanistic tigers have ever been recorded, most being due to excessive markings (pseudo-melanism or abundism) rather than true melanism; no reports of black lions have ever been substantiated. As blue or Maltese tigers probably no longer exist, gray or blue ligers are exceedingly improbable. It is not impossible for a liger to be white, but it is very rare. The first known white ligers were born in December 2013 at Myrtle Beach Safari in Myrtle Beach, South Carolina to a white male lion and a white female tiger.

== Size and growth ==
The liger is often believed to be the largest cat in the world. Males reach a total length of 3 to 3.6 m (9.8 to 11.8 ft) and can reach a weight of 500 kg (1,100 lb), which means that they can rival even large male lions and tigers in length and surpass them in weight. Imprinted genes may be a factor contributing to the large size of ligers. These are genes that may or may not be expressed on the parent they are inherited from, and that occasionally play a role in issues of hybrid growth. For example, in some dog breed crosses, genes that are expressed only when maternally inherited cause the young to grow larger than is typical for either parent breed. This growth is not seen in the paternal breeds, as such genes are normally "counteracted" by genes inherited from the female of the appropriate breed.

Other big cat hybrids can reach similar sizes; the litigon, a rare hybrid of a male lion and a female tigon, is roughly the same size as the liger, with a male named Cubanacan (at the Alipore Zoo in India) reaching 363 kg (800 lb). The extreme rarity of these second-generation hybrids may make it difficult to ascertain whether they are larger or smaller, on average, than the liger.

It is sometimes wrongly believed that ligers continue to grow throughout their lives because of hormonal issues. It may be that they simply grow far more during their growing years and take longer to reach their full adult size. Further growth in shoulder height and body length is not seen in ligers over six years old, as in both lions and tigers. Male ligers also have the same levels of testosterone on average as an adult male lion, yet are azoospermic in accordance with Haldane's rule. In addition, female ligers may also attain great size, weighing approximately 320 kg (705 lb) and reaching 3.05 m (10 ft) long on average, and are often fertile. In contrast, pumapards (hybrids between pumas and leopards) tend to exhibit dwarfism.

Ligers are about the same size as the prehistoric Smilodon populator and American lion.

=== Records ===
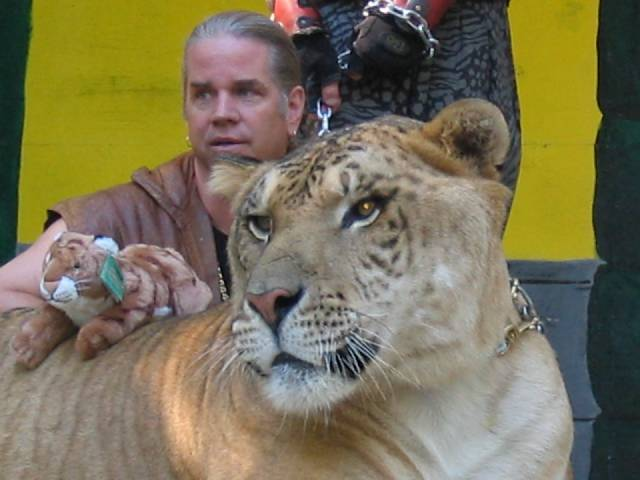
Hercules the liger and his trainer Bhagavan Antle

Hercules, the largest non-obese liger, is recognised by the Guinness Book of World Records as the largest living cat on Earth, weighing 418.2 kg (922 lb). Hercules was featured on the Today Show, Good Morning America, Anderson Cooper 360, Inside Edition, and in a Maxim article in 2005, when he was only three years old and already weighed 408 kg (899 lb).

The Valley of the Kings Animal Sanctuary in Wisconsin had a male liger named Nook who weighed over 550 kg (1,213 lb).

To compare, the records for the lion and tiger in captivity are under 500 kg (1,100 lb).

== Health and longevity ==
Though ligers typically have a life expectancy of between 13 and 18 years, they are occasionally known to live into their 20s. A ligress named Shasta was born at the Hogle Zoo in Salt Lake City on 14 May 1948 and died in 1972 at age 24. Nook, a liger at a facility in Wisconsin, died in 2007, at 21 years old. Hobbs, a male liger at the Sierra Safari Zoo in Reno, Nevada, lived to almost 15 years of age before succumbing to liver failure, and weighed 450 kg (990 lb).

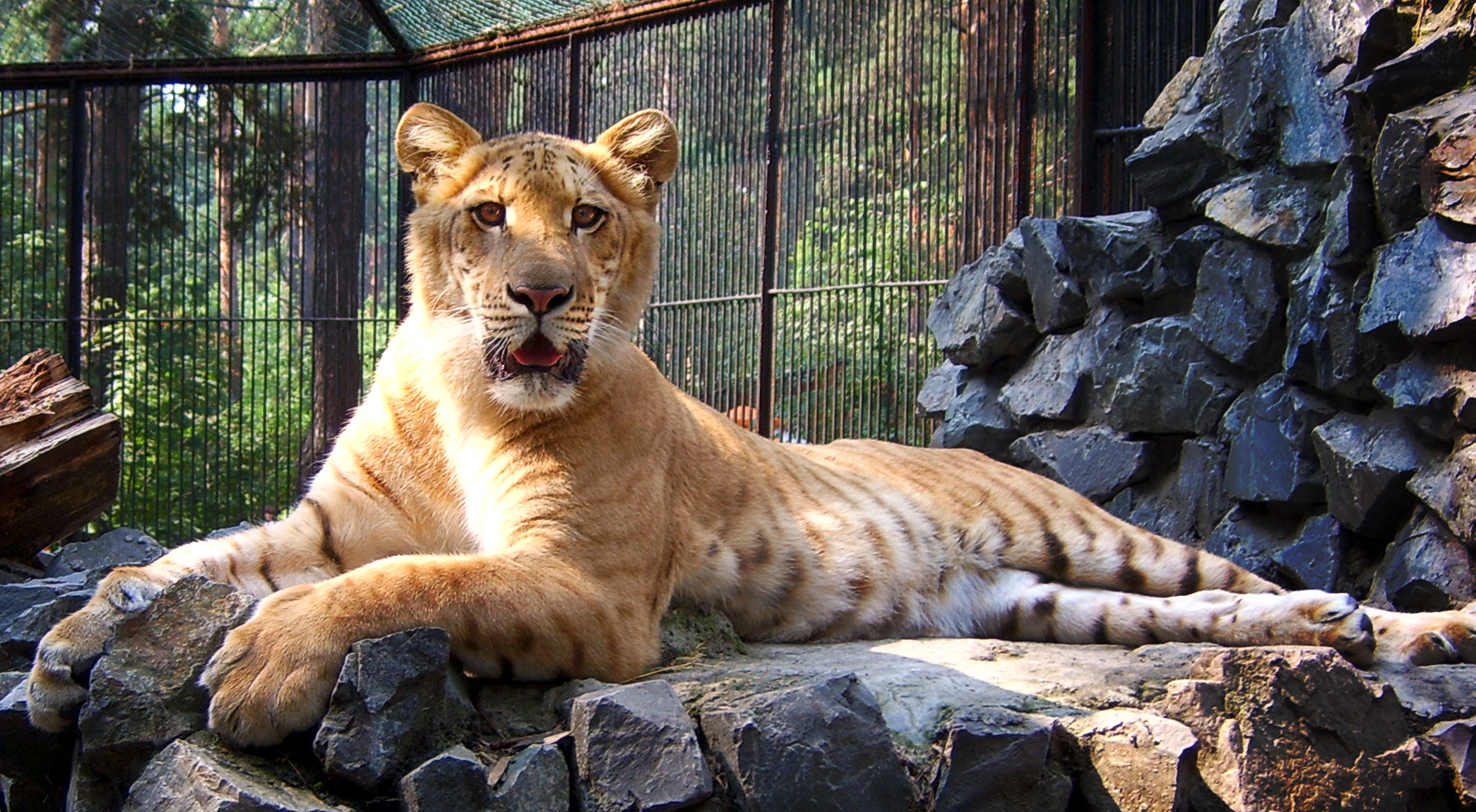
A liger at Novosibirsk Zoo

Panthera hybrids tend to experience a higher rate of injury and neurological disorder than non-hybrids. Though not without exceptions, ligers and tigons may develop health issues. Organ failure issues have been reported in ligers, in addition to neurological deficits, sterility, cancer, and arthritis.

== Fertility ==
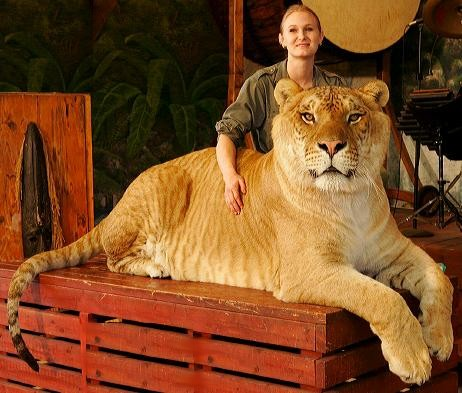
Hercules the Liger at Miami's Jungle Island

The fertility of hybrid big cat females is well-documented across a number of different hybrids. This is in accordance with Haldane's rule: in hybrids of animals whose sex is determined by sex chromosomes, if one of the two sexes is absent, rare, or sterile, it will be the heterogametic sex. Male ligers are consequently sterile, while female ligers are not.

Ligers and tigons were long thought to be totally sterile. However, in 1943, a fifteen-year-old hybrid between a lion and an island tiger was successfully mated with a lion at the Munich Hellabrunn Zoo. The female cub, though of delicate health, was raised to adulthood.

In September 2012, the Russian Novosibirsk Zoo announced the birth of a "liliger", the offspring of a liger mother and a lion father. The cub was named Kiara.

== Co-occurrence of parent species ==
As with the tigon, the liger exists only in captivity. Historically, the Asiatic lion and the Bengal tiger co-occurred in some Asian countries, and there are legends of male lions mating with tigresses in the wilderness, or of ligers existing there. The two species' ranges are known to overlap in India's Gir National Park, though no ligers were known to live there until the modern era. The range of the Caspian tiger has overlapped with that of the lion in places such as northern Iran and eastern Anatolia.

== Zoo policies ==
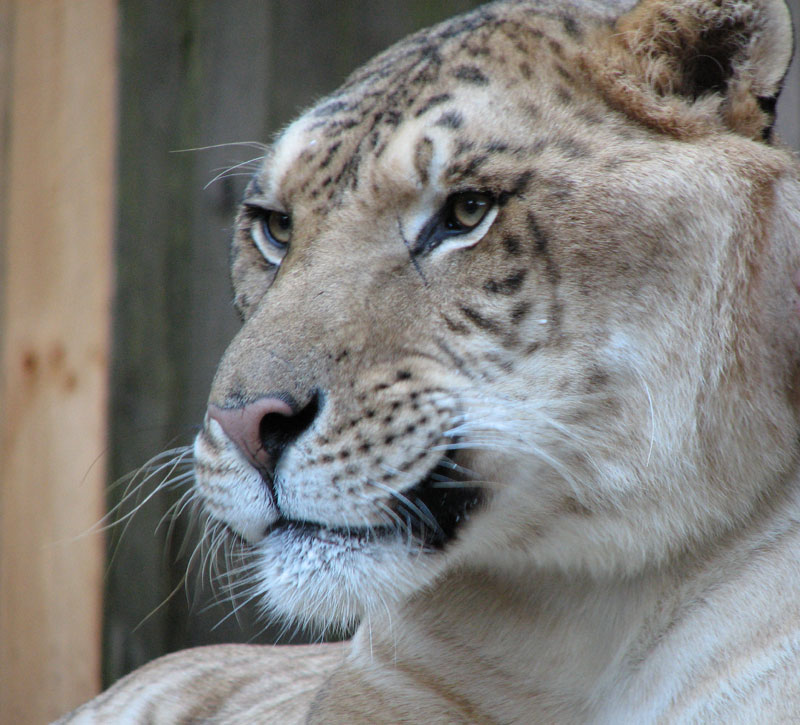
Liger face

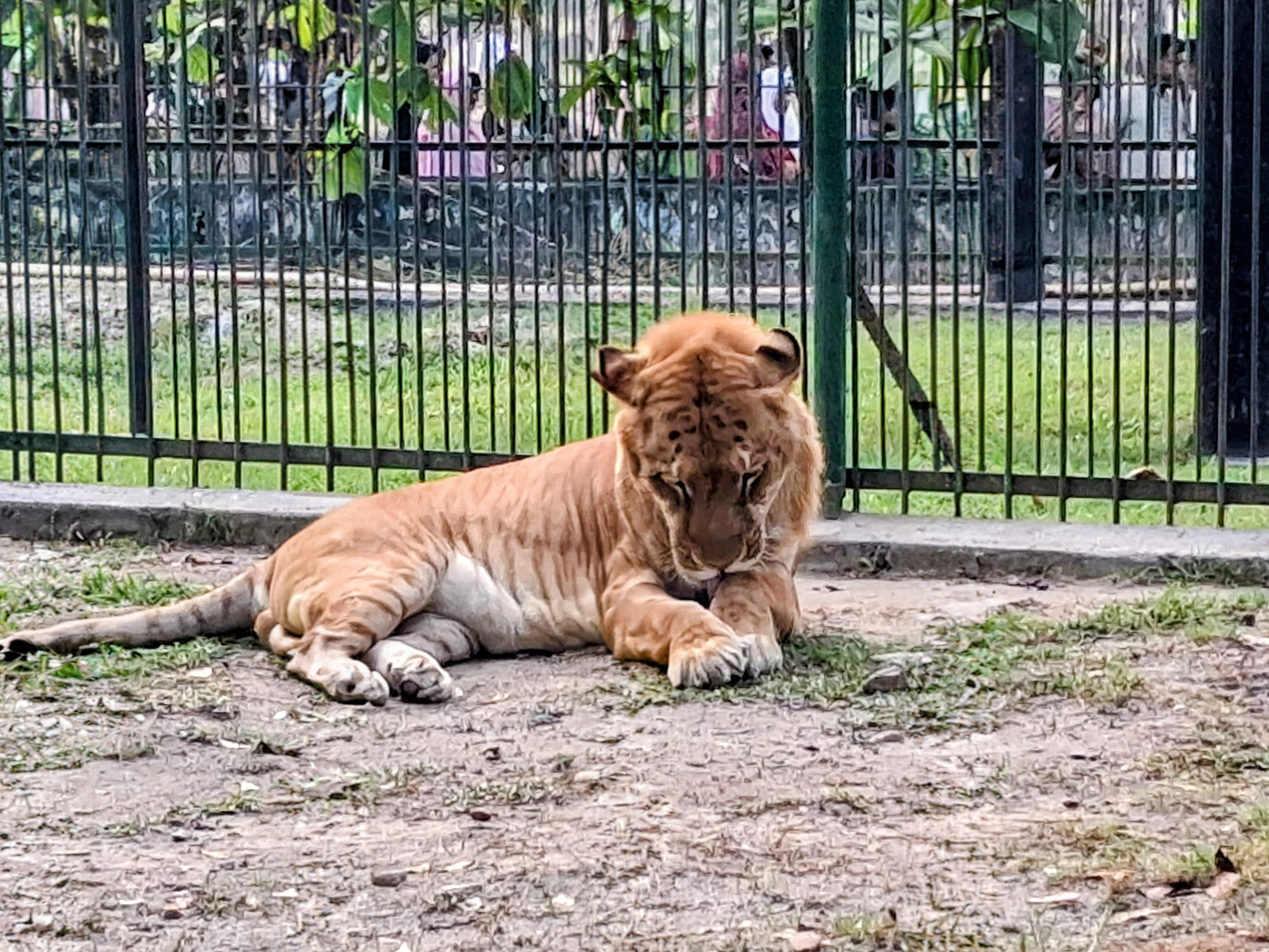
A male Liger in Khulna, Bangladesh

The United States holds the greatest population of around 30 ligers. China holds about 20 ligers. There are some countries worldwide that hold a few, but it is probable that fewer than 100 exist worldwide.

The breeding of ligers and other Panthera hybrids has come under fire from animal rights activists and organisations, who argue that the health problems experienced by these animals make their creation immoral. Despite these assertions of immorality, some unlicensed zoos still breed ligers for profit.

== See also ==
- Tigon
- Panthera hybrid
- Felid hybrid
- Leopon
- Heterosis
