= Sterility (physiology) =

Inability to sexually reproduce

Sterility is the physiological inability to effect sexual reproduction in a living thing, members of whose kind have been produced sexually. Sterility has a wide range of causes. It may be an inherited trait, as in the mule; or it may be acquired from the environment, for example through physical injury or disease, or by exposure to radiation.

Sterility is the inability to produce a biological child, while infertility is the inability to conceive after a certain period. Sterility is rarely discussed in clinical literature and is often used synonymously with infertility. Infertility affects about 12-15% of couples globally. Still, the prevalence of sterility remains unknown. Sterility can be divided into three subtypes natural, clinical, and hardship. Natural sterility is the couple's physiological inability to conceive a child. Clinical sterility is natural sterility for which treatment of the patient will not result in conception. Hardship sterility is the inability to take advantage of available treatments due to extraneous factors such as economic, psychological, or physical factors. Clinical sterility is a subtype of natural sterility, and Hardship sterility is a subtype of Clinical sterility.

== Mechanisms of sterility ==
Hybrid sterility can be caused by different closely related species breeding and producing offspring. These animals are usually sterile due to the different numbers of chromosomes between the two parents. The imbalance results in offspring that is viable but not fertile, as is the case with the mule.

Sterility can also be caused by selective breeding, where a selected trait is closely linked to genes involved in sex determination or fertility. For example, in goats bred to be polled (hornless), this results in a high number of intersex individuals among the offspring, which are typically sterile.

Sterility can also be caused by chromosomal differences within an individual. These individuals tend to be known as genetic mosaics. Loss of part of a chromosome can also cause sterility due to nondisjunction.

XX male syndrome is another cause of sterility, wherein the sexual determining factor on the Y chromosome (SRY) is transferred to the X chromosome due to an unequal crossing over. This gene triggers the development of testes, causing the individual to be phenotypically male but genotypically female.

== Economic uses of sterility ==
Economic uses of sterility include:

- The production of certain kinds of seedless fruit, such as seedless tomato or watermelon (though sterility is not the only available route to fruit seedlessness);
- Terminator technology, methods for restricting the use of genetically modified plants by causing second-generation seeds to be sterile;
- Biological control; for example, trap-neuter-return programs for cats; and the sterile insect technique, in which large numbers of sterile insects are released, which compete with fertile insects for food and mates, thus reducing the population size of subsequent generations, which can be used to fight diseases spread by insect vectors such as malaria in mosquitoes.
- Some animals which can produce sterile hybrid offspring because of mating with closely related species like mule, hinny, liger and tigon.

== See also ==
- Male infertility
