= Ram Brahma Sanyal =

Indian zookeeper (1850–1908)

Ram Brahma Sanyal রামব্রহ্ম সান্যাল
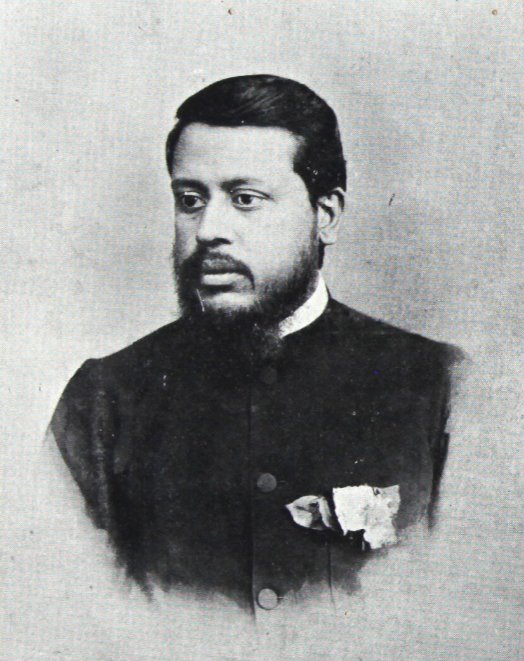
- Ram Brahma Sanyal
- Born: 1850; Lalgola, Murshidabad District, Bengal Province, British India (now in West Bengal, India)
- Died: 13 October 1908 (aged 58)
- Occupations: Zoologist, animal trainer

Ram Brahma Sanyal (1850 – 13 October 1908) was the first Indian superintendent of the Alipore Zoological Gardens in Kolkata (then Calcutta). He was a pioneer in captive breeding, and was one of the first zookeepers trained as a biologist. He was a corresponding member of the Zoological Society of London and wrote a handbook on keeping and breeding animals in captivity – A Handbook of the Management of Animals in Captivity in Lower Bengal (1892) which was reviewed in the journal Nature (4 August 1892). This was the standard handbook for zookeepers for over 50 years until Lee Crandall published The Management of Wild Mammals in Captivity in 1964. His scientific methods led to the rare birth of a live Sumatran rhinoceros in 1889, an event that was not seen in captivity until 2001.

== Biography ==
R. B. Sanyal was born in Lalgola, Murshidabad District of present-day West Bengal in 1858 at his maternal uncle's house. His native place was a village named Mahula in Murshidabad District, West Bengal. Son of Baidyanath Sanyal, he passed the Entrance examination from Baharampur College. He came to Calcutta for studies, and joined the Calcutta Medical College, probably in 1870. He gave up his studies on the recommendation of doctors as he developed eye problems. Among early influences on his career was that of George King, botanist and the superintendent of the Indian Botanical Gardens in Shibpur (then the Royal Botanic Gardens), who was a faculty at the Calcutta Medical College.

=== Publication of the handbook and other writings ===
Sanyal published notes based on observations at the zoo in the Journal of the Asiatic Society of Bengal.

=== Recognition ===
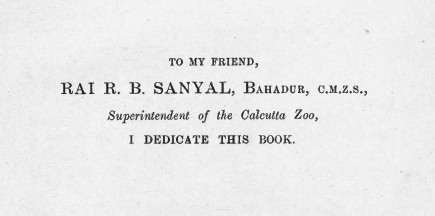
Dedication by Frank Finn in his Garden and Aviary Birds of India, 1915

Among Sanyal's most notable scientific publications were three scientific papers published in the Proceedings of the London Zoological Society in the years 1893–1895:

- Notes on a hybrid between the Semnopithecus phayrei Blyth and S. cristatus, November 1893 pp. 615 – 616
- Notes on Cynogale bennetti Gray, March 1894, pp. 296 – 297
- On the moulting of the Great Bird of Paradise with brief notes upon its habits in captivity, June 1895, pp. 541 – 542

=== Final years ===
In his final years in office, Sanyal outlined plans of acquiring animals from other places like South India and Africa, based on a system of exchange and purchase. He died while holding office, on 13 October 1908.

== Other activities ==
Sanyal was also a member of the Brahmo Samaj, a Hindu reformist movement of the late 19th century centered in Kolkata. Sanyal donated a large amount of money for the purchase of land for building the Brahmo Sammilan Samaj.
