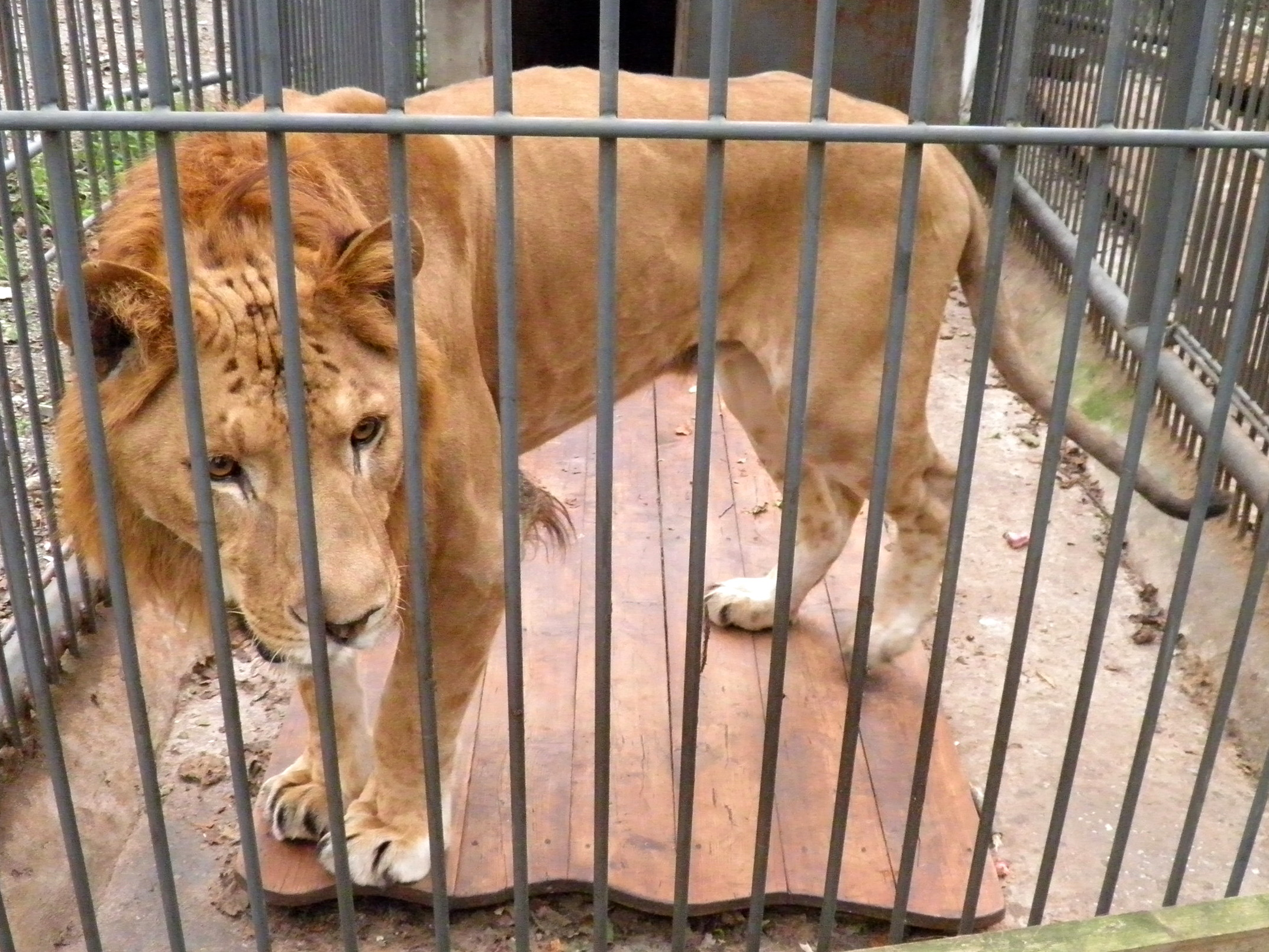
- Male liliger
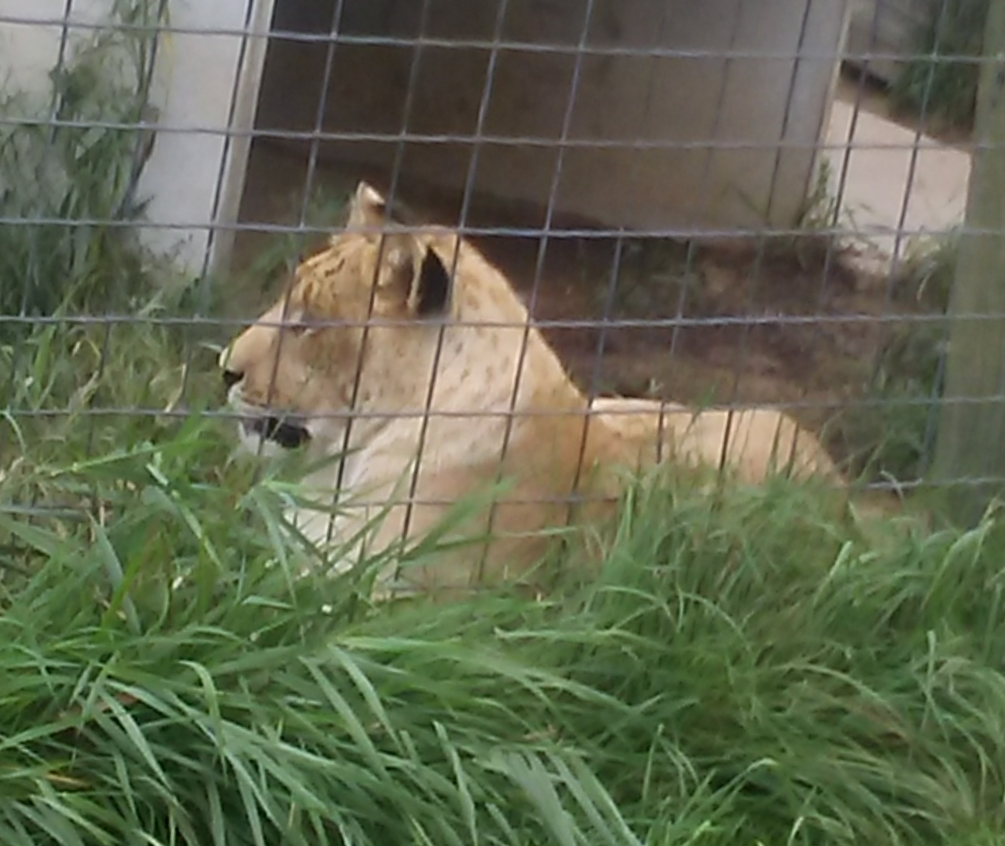
- Female liliger

Scientific classification
- Kingdom: Animalia
- Phylum: Chordata
- Class: Mammalia
- Infraclass: Placentalia
- Order: Carnivora
- Family: Felidae
- Subfamily: Pantherinae
- Genus: Panthera
- Species: P. leo♂ × P. leo × P. tigris♀

= Liliger =

Hybrid carnivore

The liliger is the hybrid offspring of a male lion (Panthera leo) and a female liger (Panthera leo♂ × Panthera tigris♀). Thus, it is a second generation hybrid. In accordance with Haldane's rule, male tigons and ligers are sterile, but female ligers and tigons can produce cubs. The first such hybrid was born in 1943, at the Hellabrunn Zoo.

== Description ==
Male liligers are slightly larger than the females, and also sport a mane, a characteristic they share with male lions. While a liger will often inherit the sandy coloring and stripes of its parentage, liligers often develop rosettes similar to a leopard.

== History ==
There are claims of successful breeding of such hybrids in the past, however, these are based on unconfirmed sources and are often contained in entertainment publications. According to Wild Cats of the World (1975) by C. A. W. Guggisberg, ligers and tigons were long thought to be sterile, but in 1943, a 15-year-old hybrid between a lion and an 'Island' tiger was successfully mated with a lion at the Munich Hellabrunn Zoo. The female cub was raised to adulthood despite its delicate health.

In September 2012, the Russian Novosibirsk Zoo announced the first scientifically proven birth of a liliger. The cub was named Kiara, and was born to an 8-year-old female liger, Zita, and a male African lion, Sam. On May 16, 2013, the same couple produced three more female liligers: Luna, Sandra, and Eva.

A liliger was born in the United States from a lion named Simba and a ligress named Akaria at 6:18 AM on November 29, 2013, at The Garold Wayne Interactive Zoological Foundation in Oklahoma. At approximately 3:00 AM on November 30, 2013, the ligress gave birth to two more cubs.

Craig Packer, director of the Lion Research Center at the University of Minnesota has said "In terms of conservation, it's so far away from anything, it's kind of pointless to even say it's irrelevant." The Association of Zoos and Aquariums (AZA), the organization responsible for accrediting zoos in North America, neither approves of nor breeds the animals, because they focus on the conservation of wildlife and programs serving that purpose.

== See also ==
- Litigon
