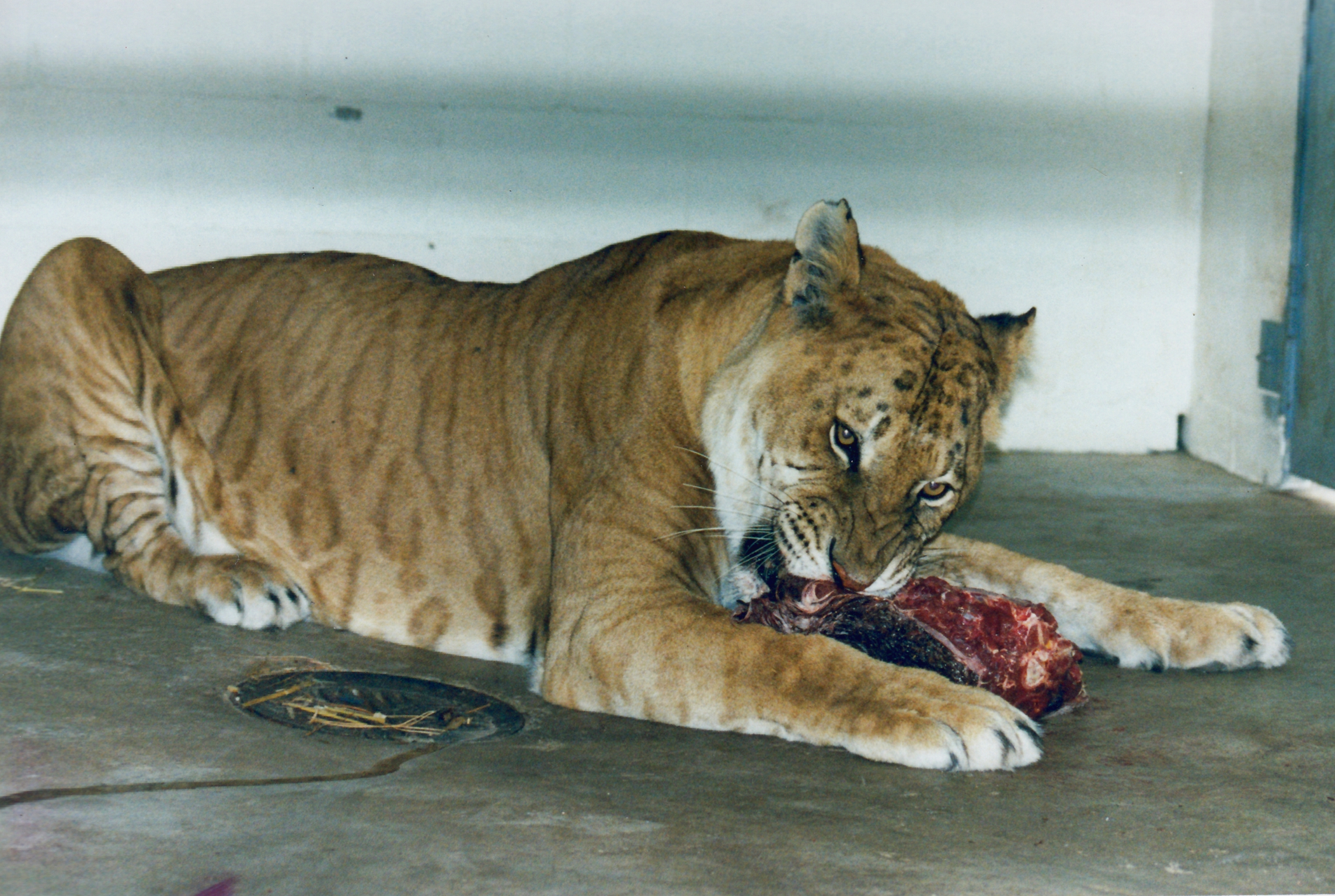
- Tigon at National Zoo & Aquarium in Canberra, Australia

Scientific classification
- Kingdom: Animalia
- Phylum: Chordata
- Class: Mammalia
- Infraclass: Placentalia
- Order: Carnivora
- Family: Felidae
- Subfamily: Pantherinae
- Genus: Panthera
- Species: P. tigris♂ × P. leo♀

= Tigon =

Tiger and lioness hybrid

The tigon also called tiglion, tigion, and tion is a hybrid offspring of a male tiger (Panthera tigris) and a female lion, or lioness (Panthera leo). They exhibit visible characteristics from both parents: they can have both spots from the mother (lions carry genes for spots – lion cubs are spotted and some adults retain faint markings) and stripes from the father. Any mane that a male tigon may have will appear shorter and less noticeable than a lion's mane and is closer in type to the ruff of a male tiger.

Tigons do not exceed the size of their parents' original species because they inherit growth-inhibitory genes from both parents, but they do not exhibit any kind of dwarfism or miniaturization; they often weigh around 180 kg (400 lb). It is distinct from the reciprocal cross, the liger, which is a hybrid of a male lion and a female tiger, often weighing from 320 kg (710 lb) to 550 kg (1,210 lb).

== Fertility ==
Ligers and tigons were long thought to be sterile; in 1943, however, a 15-year-old hybrid between a lion and a tiger was successfully mated at the Munich Hellabrunn Zoo. The female cub was then raised to adulthood. Like the liger, male tigons are sterile while the females are fertile.

At the Alipore Zoo in India, a tigoness named Rudhrani, born in 1971, was successfully mated to a male Asiatic lion named Debabrata. The rare, second-generation hybrid was called a litigon. Rudhrani produced seven litigons in her lifetime. Some of these reached impressive sizes - a litigon named Cubanacan weighed at least 363 kg (800 lb), stood 1.32 m (4 ft 4 in) at the shoulder, and was 3.5 m (11 ft) in total length.

== Coexistence of parental species ==
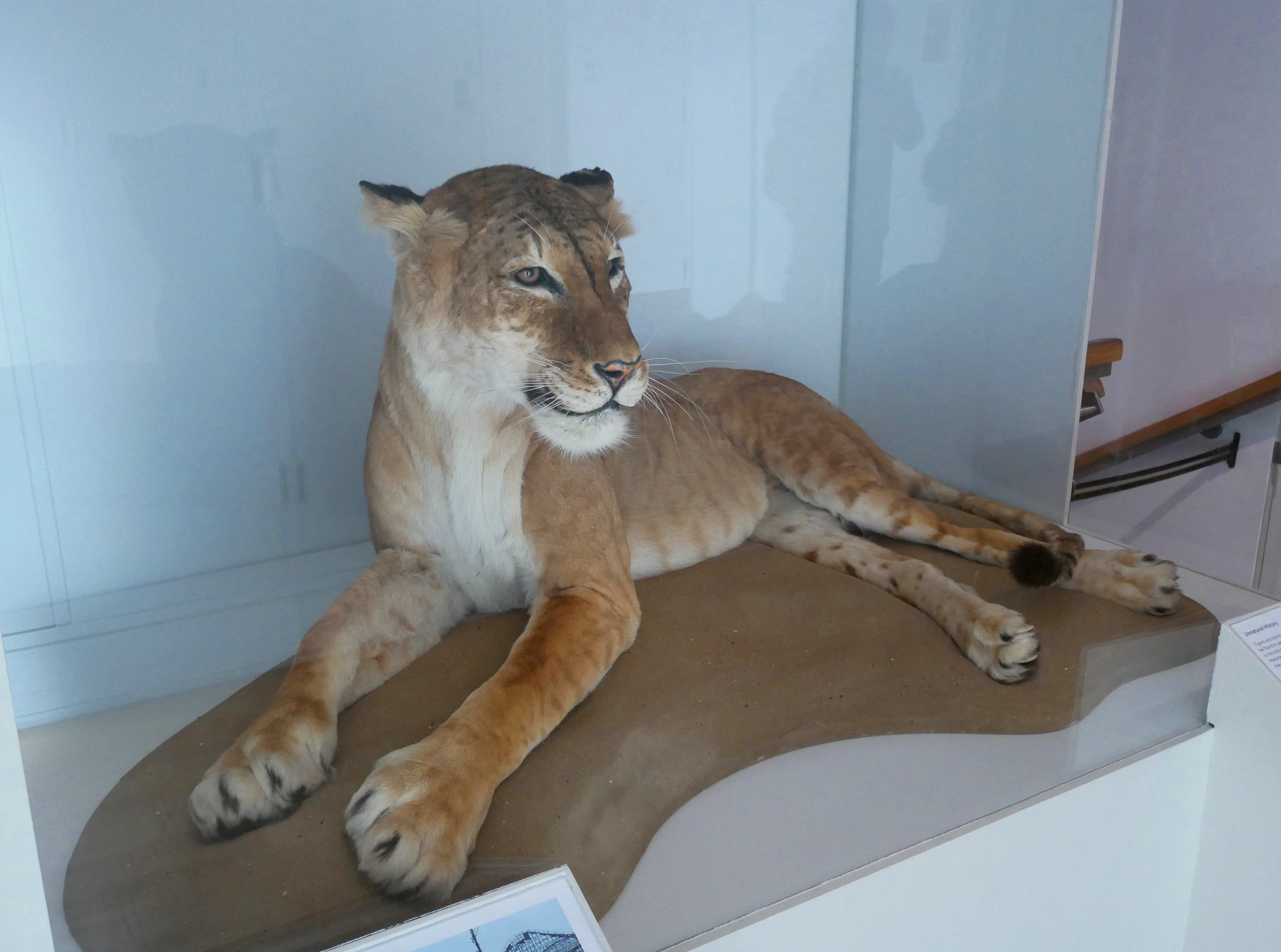
Maude, a tigon displayed at Manchester Museum, England.

As with the liger, the tigon is found only in captivity, because the habitats of the tiger and lion do not overlap. In the past, however, the Asiatic lion did coexist with the Bengal tiger in the wilderness of India, besides occurring in countries where the Caspian tiger had been, such as Iran and Turkey. In India, there is a plan to shift some lions from their current home of the Gir Forest to Kuno Wildlife Sanctuary, which has some tigers, but it has not been implemented as of December 2017, perhaps due to political reasons, as the Gujarat state government does not want any other state to have lions in the forests.

== See also ==
- Liliger
- Panthera hybrid
- Liger
