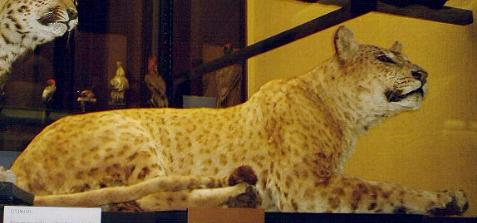
- This stuffed jaguar/lion hybrid from the Rothschild Museum in England is the closest we have to an impression of how the so-called Congolese spotted lion may have looked.

Scientific classification
- Kingdom: Animalia
- Phylum: Chordata
- Class: Mammalia
- Order: Carnivora
- Family: Felidae
- Subfamily: Pantherinae
- Genus: Panthera
- Species: P. leo♂ × P. pardus × P. onca♀

= Congolese spotted lion =

Hybrid carnivore

A Congolese spotted lion, also known by the portmanteau lijagulep, is the hybrid of a male lion and female jaguar-leopard hybrid (a jagulep or lepjag). Several lijaguleps have been bred, but only one appears to have been exhibited as a Congolese spotted lion. It was most likely given that name by a showman because the public were more interested in exotic captured animals than in captive-bred hybrids.

== The story ==
The Times (April 15, 1908) pg. 6:

A Strange Animal From The Congo: Mr. J. D. Hamlyn, the animal dealer of St. George St., E., who obtained two or three new monkeys from the Congo, has just received from the same region a very curious feline animal nearly as large as an adult lioness, which it resembles in build, but irregularly spotted. There is no trace of a mane or ruff, nor is the tail tufted as in the lion. The general hue is tawny, but with a rufous tinge, reminding one of the coat of a cheetah rather than of the leopard, and the inner sides of the limbs are yellowish white, with dark spots. The markings on the upper surface differ greatly in size and character; on the hind limbs they are large; toward the forequarters and head they diminish in size, but increase greatly in number, and the face is so to speak, strippled with black, except on the nose. There is a black mark on each side of the lower jaw, and a black stripe on the posterior side of each ear; and along the spine, from the root of the tail to about the centre of the back is a row of dark markings, somewhat like disconnected links of a chain. The hue of the tail for the greater part of its length corresponds to that of the body, but the terminal portion is banded with black and white. The animal, a female, is in excellent condition and fairly quiet. The obvious suggestion is that the animal is a wild-bred hybrid, with a lioness for dam and a spotted cat for sire. Lion-tiger hybrids were bred in this country by Atkins, the proprietor of a famous travelling menagerie; among Continental breeders Carl Hagenbeck has been most successful. A cross between a puma and leopard has also been obtained, but wild-bred hybrids between the larger cats are exceedingly rare. Today the animal will be sent to the Zoological Gardens, where the question of its parentage will be scientifically investigated.

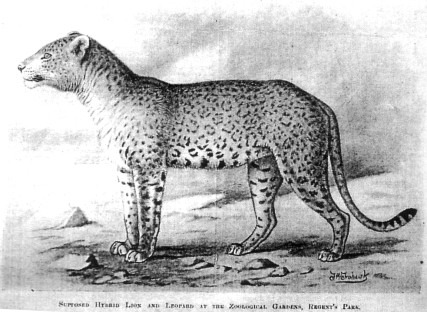
Frohawk's drawing

In The Field No 2887, April 25, 1908, the editor wrote:

An illustration reproduced from a drawing by Mr F W Frohawk, of the supposed lion-leopard at the Zoological Gardens is now presented, and it will be interesting to compare it with the picture which accompanies the letter on feline hybrids by Mr Scherren. Mr R I Pocock's remarks on this interesting animal which appeared in last week's "Field" leave little more to be said at present. It would certainly appear to be either a hybrid lion-leopard, or else a new species of large leopard, a supposition strengthened by several points of closer resemblance to a leopard that to a lion, and the pattern of the larger rosette markings which are like those of the snow leopard (Felis uncia). It may be well to note in further detail the colouring and markings of the beast. The ground colour is a pale tawny-buff, blending into creamy-white on the undersurface of the body; chin, throat, chest, inside of legs and undersurface of end of tail whitel; the whole surface of the body and legs is spotted similar or a leopard and snow leopard, the head and neck being less plainly marked; all the markings on the upper parts are pale, dusky, developing into black below, and deep black on both surfaces of the legs. An important feature is the pattern of the larger rosette markings, which are similar to those of the snow leopard, being composed of smaller spots, but forming larger rosettes than is usual in the ordinary leopard. Excepting the crown, the spots on the head, and especially on the neck, are small, and more or less indistinct. The fore paws, rump and basal three-fourths of the tail are much like those of a lioness in form, but the end of the tail, although less ample, is marked like a show leopard's. The black angle of the mouth is similar to that of a leopard; the nose is dull-pink and eyes pale ochreous, like most leopards; but the general squareness of the head and rather large ears are more lion like. At times, when the animal is standing slackly, she is hollow backed, but usually the back is as shown in the drawing. That idea that this animal may possibly prove to be a new species of great cat will not be generally entertained; but it must be remembered that a far more conspicuous creature, to wit, the okapi, has only been made known to us of late years, and that it is possible that such an animal as that now in question frequenting, as it would undoubtedly do, dense forest regions, and being of nocturnal habits, might have escaped observation.

The possibility was considered that the Congolese spotted lion may have been part cheetah or a new species of leopard. In The Field No 2887, April 25, 1908, Henry Scherren wrote:

In all probability the interesting animal now in the lion house of the Zoological Gardens is the only feline hybrid yet exhibited for which the claim has been advanced that it was wild bred. The story of its origin as told to Mr Hamlyn, and given by Mr Pocock in his letter, is of considerable interest; but, in my opinion, the interest will be heightened when the gentleman by whom the animal was consigned to Mr Hamlyn gives us full particulars. On the view that this animal was bred in the Congo, with a lioness for dam, there could have been but two possible sires: the leopard or the cheetah. Mr Pocock has given his reasons for accepting the former, but I think he will admit that there is a superficial resemblance to the latter. Conclusive evidence against the supposition that a cheetah had any share in the parentage - tough it occurred to me when I first saw the animal in her travelling box - is afforded by the size of the head, the massive forelimbs, and the retractile claws.

Certain difficulties, however, present themselves with regard to the story that the animal was wild bred. One was pointed out by Mr Pocock in his remark that 'if representatives of the two species were to meet the encounter would be more likely to end in the death of the leopard than in the establishment of friendly relations between them.' next I cannot equate the appearance of the animal in regard to age and development with the scanty details that have been given to Mr Hamlyn. Granting that it was even two years old when brought by the natives to the French trading settlement, the two years spent in confinement in Africa and the time occupied in the passage to Europe do not, in my opinion, account for the whole span of its existence. And from what I saw of the hybrid before she was unpacked, and afterwards in one of the spacious dens in the lion house, I should have come to the conclusion that she was well used to being exhibited but for the assurance from Mr Hamlyn that this was not the case. Everybody who has seen the animal will agree with Mr Pocock that it is of the highest interest, and it is to be hoped that it will remain in its present quarters.

The Times (Monday May 4, 1908) pg. 12:

Sale Of A Supposed Congo Hybrid. After having been on view in the lion house at the Zoological Garden for about a fortnight the feline hybrid described in The Times of April 15 was sold by auction at Aldridge's on Saturday. The attendance was very large; among those present were a good many showmen. Bidding began at 100 guineas, and eventually the animal was knocked down by Mr. Bostock at 1,030 guineas. One of the conditions of sale appears somewhat strange for it disclaimed any guarantee as to the animal's breeding, age, or any other description. This would seem to show that the story of the animal, as told to Mr. Hamlyn by the original owner, has not been verified. The story was that the hybrid had been brought as a cub by natives to a French trading settlement somewhere up country from the Gabon, and kept in captivity for about two years before being transported to the West Coast and shipped to Europe in a French boat. At any rate the responsible officials at the Zoological Society do not appear to have been convinced by the story, or they would probably have made some offer for the animal, for which about 500 pounds was asked a fortnight ago. The keepers in the lion house maintain a strong opinion that it was bred in a menagerie; the responsible officials are more reticent on the subject and prefer to wait for evidence as to the place of birth, and the species from which the creature was bred.

== The real story ==
Three jaguar/leopardess hybrids were bred in Chicago, United States, possibly at Lincoln Park Zoo where other hybrids such as the pumapard were captive. These were sold to a traveling menagerie and one was displayed at London Zoo and White City (in London). The female jaguleps had refused to mate with a leopard, but one female was mated to a lion and produced several litters. One of the offspring was exhibited in London in 1908 and was claimed to be a type of lion. It was the size of a lioness and had brown rosettes or spots. It is not noted whether the other lijagulep cubs survived to adulthood.

In The Field No 2889, May 9, 1908, R I Pocock wrote:

Sir - Since you were good enough to publish in the Field of April 18 my description of the supposed lion-leopard hybrid with its history as issued to the press by Mr Hamlyn, I should like to give what I am convinced is the true story of its origin and antecedents, so as to lay at rest once and for all the idea that it was a natural product of the French Congo.

Some years ago, three hybrids, one male, two female, were bred in Chicago from a male jaguar and an Indian leopardess, and were bought by the proprietor of an American traveling show of performing animals. The male was killed by a lion, but the females lived, grew to the size of a jaguar, and when adult were mated with a young lion, choosing him, it is said, in preference to male leopards. Several litters were born, each consisting of two cubs. These resembled a lion in general colour, but were spotted. In the case of every litter the spots of one cub were like those of the jaguar, and the others like those of a leopard. The males were without mane. At the end of last year, some of these animals, then about three and a half years old, were alive in the United States.

These facts I can vouch for on first hand authority. My conviction that the animal recently exhibited in the Zoological Gardens is one of those hybrids with jaguar-like spots is a conclusion deduced from a combination of circumstances, partly from a knowledge of the recent importation by Mr Bostock from America of a number of animals for the exhibition at Earl's Court, partly from a clue supplied to me by Mr Carl Hagenbeck, who predicted almost to the letter the outcome of the sale, partly from overheard remarks let drop at the auction at Aldridge's, and finally from the fact that the animal was knocked down to Mr Bostock for a sum representing ten times its market value. With the above-mentioned facts before them, your readers will be able to piece in the details of the entire transaction without further comment on my part. From a scientific standpoint the animal gains interest from a knowledge of its true nature. Not suspecting three species to be involved in its parentage, I was not quite right in determining it as a lion-leopard hybrid, although the spots, as I stated, obviously recall those of a jaguar, I dismissed that species in considering its pedigree on account of its comparatively slender build and the great length of the tail. He elimination of the shortness of the tail and of the sturdiness in shape of the jaguar is not surprising, however, seeing that these characters are only found in one out of the three parent forms.

The male lijagulep hybrid was said to have been killed by a lion while on display in Glasgow. In his comparison of a leopon with a lijagulep, R I Pocock wrote in The Field (2 November 1912):

The nearest approach to [a lion-leopard] hybrid hitherto reported is the one bred at Chicago between a male lion and a female cross between a jaguar and a leopard, the true story of which, accompanied by a good figure by Mr Frohawk, may be found in the Field for April 18 and 25, and May 9, 1908. The final episode in the history of that animal has, I believe, not yet been told. After being exhibited in the Zoological Gardens and at the White City it went to Glasgow, where, according to a sensational Press notice, it was killed by a lion, which broke down the partition between the cages and made short work of its opponent. That this story was of a piece with the original account of the hybrid given out when it first appeared on the market may be inferred from the condition of the dressed skin, which had no sign of a tear or scratch upon it in London shortly after the alleged tragedy. The chief difference between this hybrid of three species and the lion-leopard born at Kolhapur lies in the size of the spots, those of the [lijagulep] being large and jaguar-like, as might be expected, while those of the [leopon] are small and more leopard-like.

The skin of the killed lijagulep went on sale in London shortly after the alleged tragedy and as noted in 1968 by German cat specialist Dr Helmut Hemmer, it appears to be this skin, mounted in a standing pose very closely corresponding with the illustration by Frohawk, that is displayed at France's National Museum of Natural History. In addition, there is a mounted jaguar-lion hybrid, preserved in a lying-down pose with head raised, at the Walter Rothschild Zoological Museum, Tring, England.

== Contemporary comparison with lion and leopard hybrids ==
To put the Congolese spotted lion into its proper context as a hybrid, lions had been hybridized with several big cat species, several of which are mentioned in the media accounts of the Congolese spotted lion, supporting the theory that the animal was a hybrid.

- with leopards to produce leopons and lipards - RI Pocock compared the appearance of the lijagulep to that of a leopon in The Field of 2 November 1912.
- with tigers to produce ligers and tigons - The Times article of April 15, 1908 mentions these as part of its report on the Congolese spotted lion
- with jaguars to produce jaglions - described by H Hemmer in his analysis of the skin

A mounted specimen labelled as a jaguar-lion hybrid is displayed at the Rothschild Museum in Tring, England. The Paris specimen is the closest we have to an impression of how the Congolese spotted lion may have looked when alive. The age and pose of this specimen suggests it is the skin of the female lijagulep killed in Glasgow. Hemmer identified it as being either lion x jaguar or being lion x (leopard x jaguar).

Leopards have been crossbred with jaguars to produce jaguleps (also known as leguars or lepjags), one such was the dam of the lijagulep. As mentioned in the quote from The Times as evidence in favour of the cat being a hybrid, leopards had also been crossed with pumas (see pumapards).

== Fertility and breeding ==
In general, male big cat hybrids are sterile while female big cat hybrids are fertile and may be bred back to one of the parental species or to another big cat species, as was the case with the Congolese spotted lion (a 3-species complex hybrid).

In general, hybrids are no longer bred by zoos as the current emphasis is on conservation of pure species. The only hybrid big cats commonly and deliberately bred in recent times are ligers. It is unlikely that further lijaguleps will be bred. In theory, if one of these hybrids were to be reproduced and was fertile, a tiger could make for an interesting four species cross.

== See also ==
- Marozi
