= Hislop College =

Higher-educational institution in Nagpur, India

Coordinates: 21.1483°N 79.0715°E

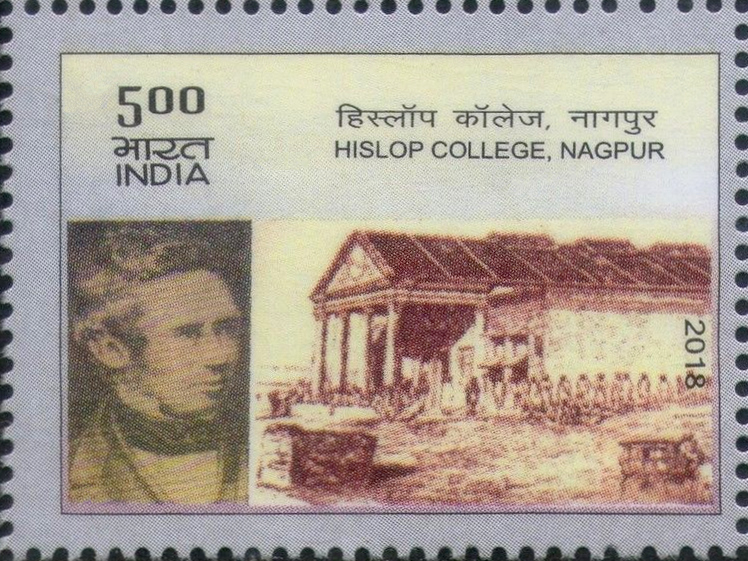
- 2018 postage stamp issued by the India Post commemorating Hislop College
- Type: Private
- Established: 1883 (143 years ago)
- Accreditation: NAAC Re-Accredited 'A' Grade, CGPA 3.20
- Affiliations: Rashtrasant Tukadoji Maharaj Nagpur University
- Principal: Dr. Prashant Shelke
- Academic staff: 82
- Students: 4272
- Location: Civil lines, Nagpur, Maharashtra, 440001, India
- Campus: 7 acres (2.8 ha); Urban
- Website: www.hislopcollege.ac.in

Hislop College, Nagpur is one of the oldest colleges in the city of Nagpur. It is affiliated to Rashtrasant Tukadoji Maharaj Nagpur University.

== Founder ==
The college was named after Scottish missionary Stephen Hislop (1817–1863), who was a noted evangelist, educationist and geologist. He worked for 18 years in the Vidarbha Region alongside Robert Hunter, editor of the Encyclopædic dictionary.

== History ==
Hislop College was established in 1883 in the Mahal area of Nagpur (But today it is in Civil Lines). Though Nagpur was Capital of Central Provinces, until 1882 it had no college.

The college was affiliated to the University of Calcutta until 1904, and later to Allahabad University. In 1923 it was one of six colleges affiliated to the University of Nagpur.

The American pastor, James M. Lawson, Jr., worked as a missionary there in the campus ministry office from 1953 to 1956, studying Gandhian nonviolence and satyagraha, which influenced his movement-building skills. Thereafter he returned to the United States to become a leading intellectual force in the Civil Rights movement.

== Research ==
The faculty and Students of Hislop College has carried out 60 Research project in a field of Botany, Sociology, Bio Chemistry, Commerce, Physics, Computer Science, Literature (English, Hindi and Marathi) which has been sanctioned by the University and has been working on 15 research projects on Commerce, Botany, History and Sociology.

== Notable alumni ==
Many people from the neighbouring area have completed their education at Hislop College.

They include:

- M. S. Golwalkar, second Sarsanghchalak (Supreme Leader) of the Rashtriya Swayamsevak Sangh.
- Rajkumar Hirani, film maker
- Shahbaz Khan, actor
- Shishir Parkhie – A widely acclaimed Indian Ghazal Singer, Composer & Live Performer.
- Anees Ahmed
- Purushottam Bhaskar Bhave, Marathi writer
- Hari Singh Gour, Founder Vice-Chancellor of University of Delhi
- Ashis Nandy, political psychologist
- C. K. Nayudu, first captain of Indian national cricket team
- Nitin Raut, former Maharashtra Cabinet Minister
- Mukul Wasnik, former Union Cabinet Minister
- P. V. Narasimha Rao, 9th Prime Minister of India
- Vilas Muttemwar, Member of Parliament
- Pooja Banerjee, Television actress
- Shekhar Mande, former Director General, CSIR and Secretary, DSIR, Govt of India. Shanti Swarup Bhatnagar Prize
- B. D. Kulkarni, chemical reaction engineer, Shanti Swarup Bhatnagar laureate
- Madhukar Narhar Chandurkar, former Chief Justice of Bombay High Court and Madras High Court.
