= Trochilus (crocodile bird) =

Legendary bird, first described by Herodotus

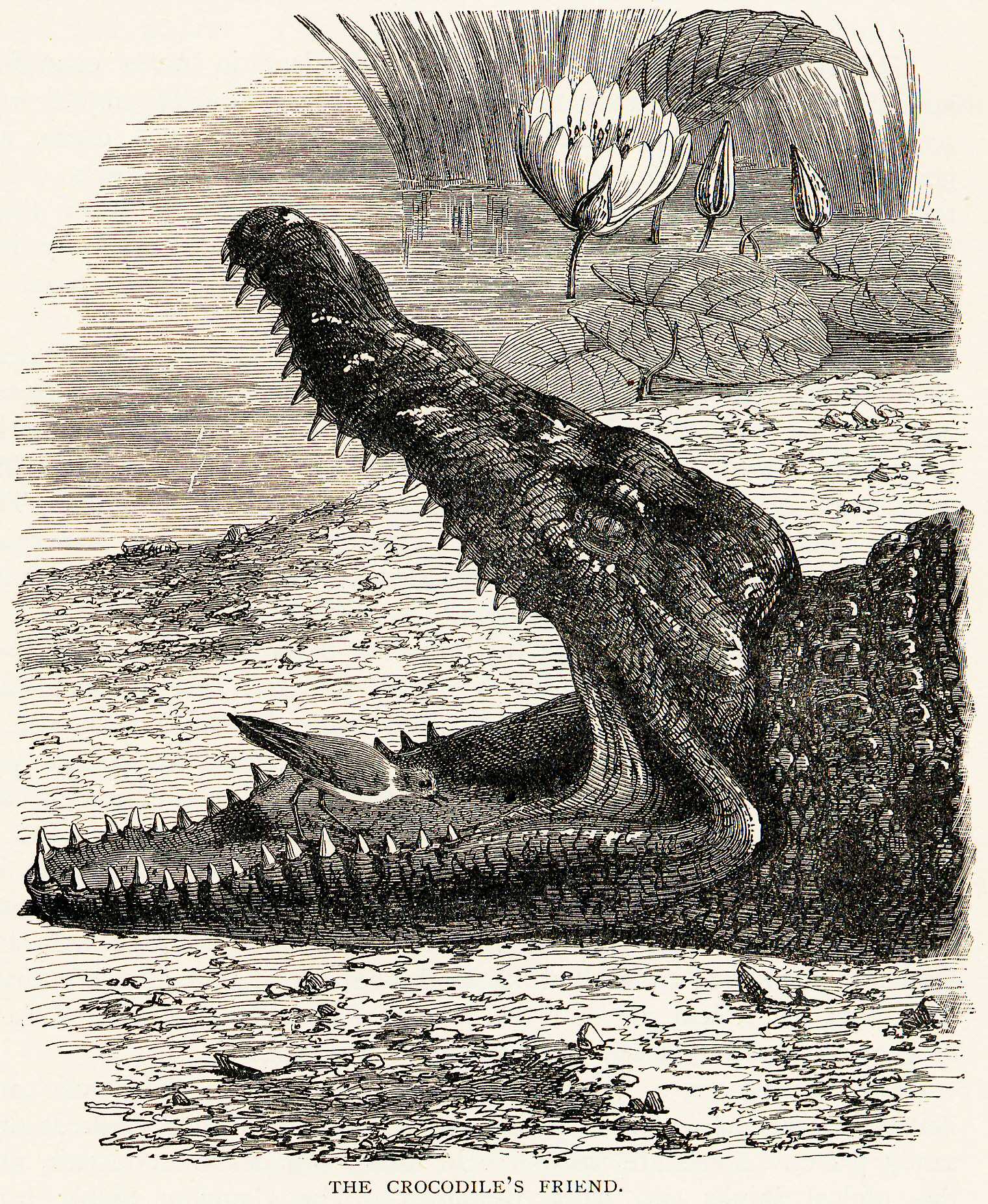
"The Crocodile's Friend" from Henry Scherren's Popular Natural History (1906)

The trochilus or trochilos (Greek: τροχίλος, trokhílos = "runner"), sometimes called the crocodile bird, is a legendary bird, first described by Herodotus (c. 440 BC), and later by Aristotle, Pliny, and Aelian, which was supposed to have enjoyed a symbiotic relationship with the Nile crocodile: it was said to pick leeches from the crocodile's throat by Herodotus, and to pick the crocodile's teeth by Aristotle. The trochilus has subsequently been spuriously identified with several bird species endemic to the Nile valley.

== Ancient sources ==
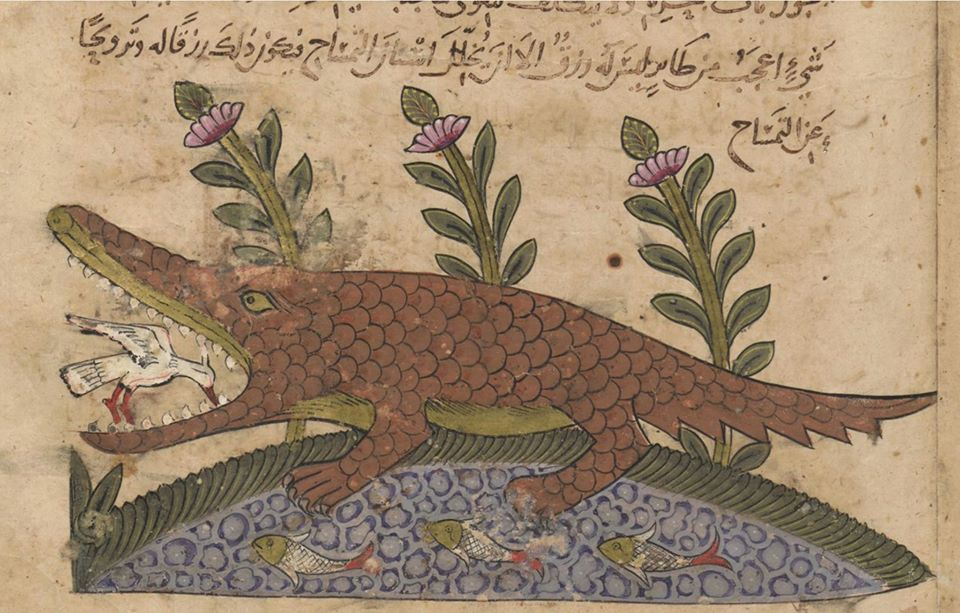
Illustration from a 17th-century copy of al-Jāḥiẓ, Kitāb al-Ḥayawān ("Book of the Animals")

=== Herodotus ===
According to the Histories of Herodotus, the Egyptian crocodiles bask on the shore with their mouths open and a bird called a "trochilus" flies into their open mouths so as to feed on the leeches which, because of the crocodiles' aquatic habitat, live there in abundance:

As [the crocodile] lives chiefly in the river, it has the inside of its mouth constantly covered with leeches; hence it happens that, while all the other birds and beasts avoid it, with the trochilus it lives at peace, since it owes much to that bird: for the crocodile, when he leaves the water and comes out upon the land, is in the habit of lying with his mouth wide open, facing the western breeze: at such times the trochilus goes into his mouth and devours the leeches. This benefits the crocodile, who is pleased, and takes care not to hurt the trochilus.

=== Aristotle ===
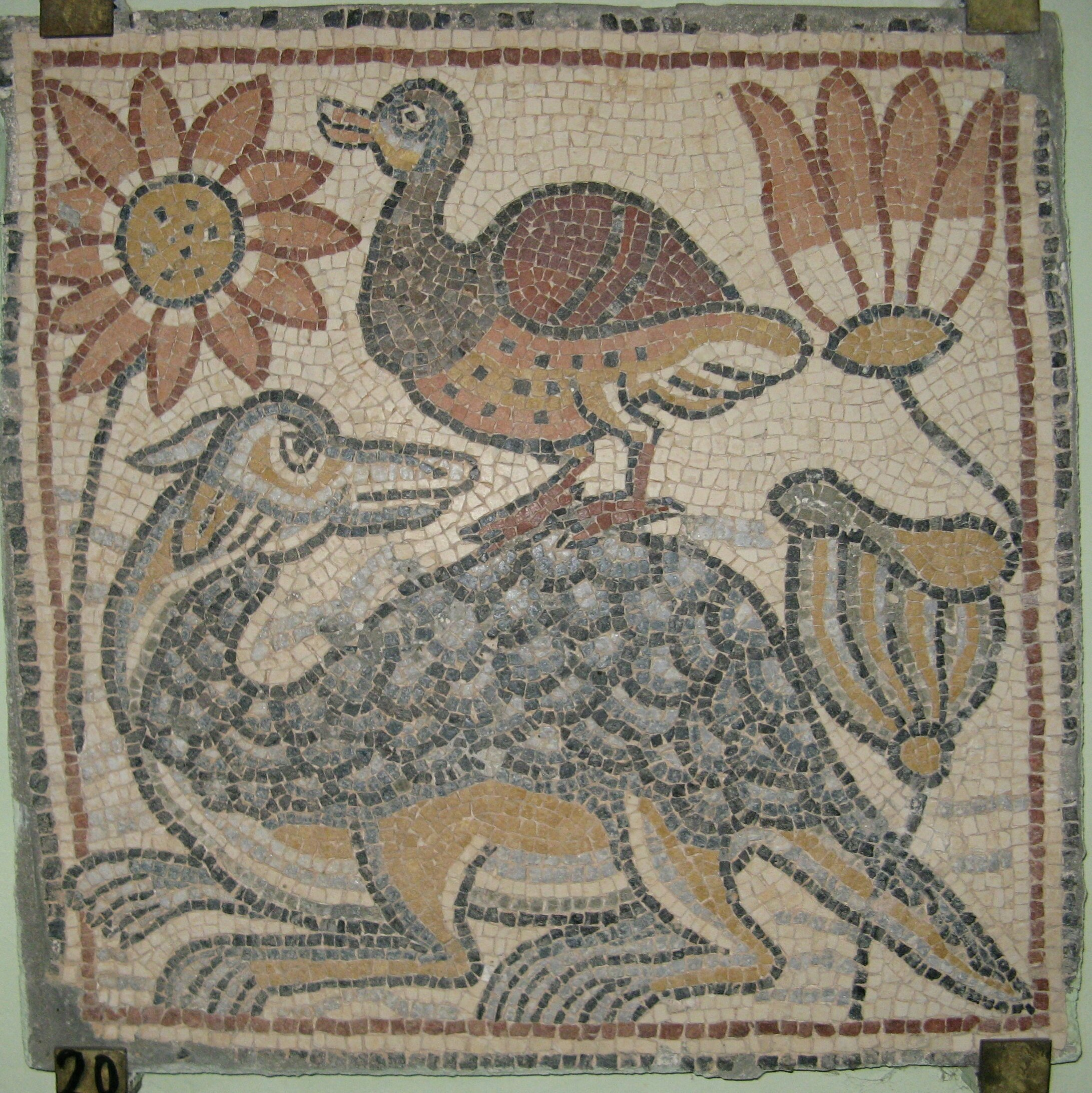
Bird atop a crocodile: mosaic from an Eastern church in Olbia, Libya

In the course of his biological researches, Aristotle classifies the trochilus among the water-birds in his History of Animals. Aristotle records the same pattern of cleaning symbiosis reported by Herodotus, but differs as to its purpose, stating that "when the crocodile gapes, the trochilus flies into its mouth, to cleanse its teeth", presumably to feed on decaying meat lodged between the teeth and gums.

=== Pliny ===
The story is further elaborated by Pliny the Elder in his Natural History in connection with the tale of the ichneumon.

When [the crocodile] has glutted itself with fish, it goes to sleep on the banks of the river, a portion of the food always remaining in its mouth; upon which, a little bird, which in Egypt is known as the trochilus, and, in Italy, as the king of the birds, for the purpose of obtaining food, invites the crocodile to open its jaws; then, hopping to and fro, it first cleans the outside of its mouth, next the teeth, and then the inside, while the animal opens its jaws as wide as possible, in consequence of the pleasure which it experiences from the titillation. It is at these moments that the ichneumon, seeing it fast asleep in consequence of the agreeable sensation thus produced, darts down its throat like an arrow, and eats away its intestines.

=== Aelian ===
Aelian in his On the Nature of Animals says that leeches invade the mouth of the crocodile, as it swims with it open, and cause the animal much discomfort; feeling the need of the trochilus as "doctor", it swims to the bank and lies there with its jaws agape, whereupon the bird enters and removes the leeches, while the crocodile remains perfectly still so as not to harm it. Aelian also acknowledges the existence of several types of trochilus other than the crocodile bird.

== Modern theories ==
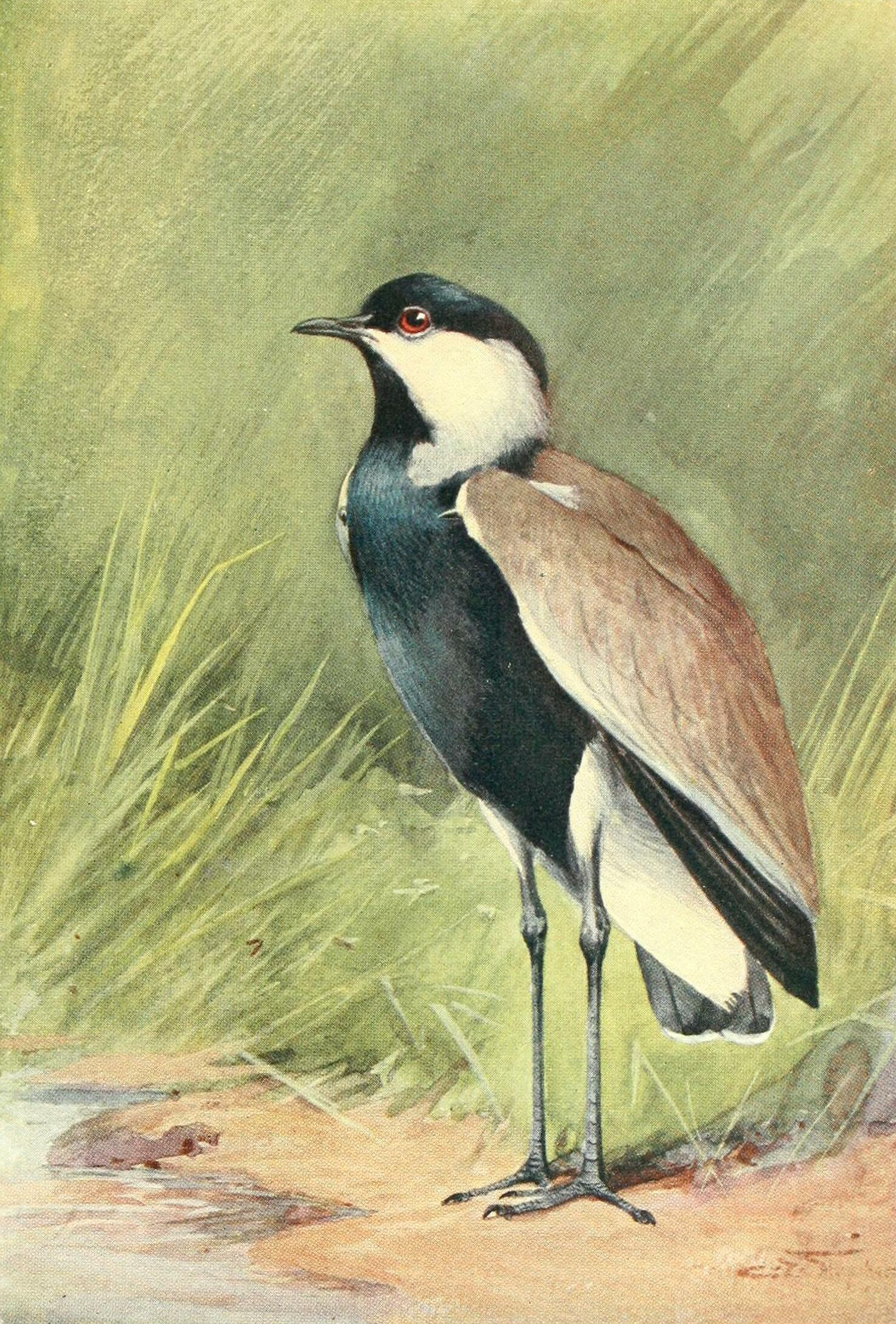
Spur-winged lapwing (1909)

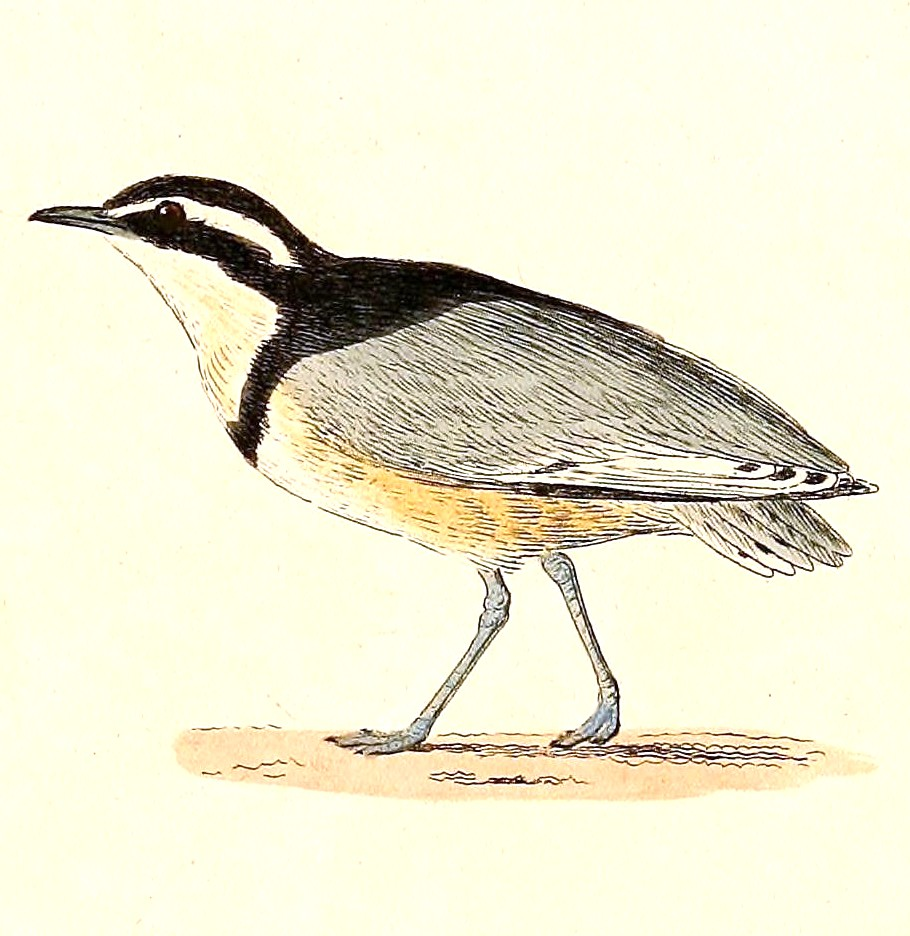
Egyptian plover (1832)

The story that the trochilus cleans the mouth of the crocodile is considered a fable, but many travellers and naturalists have been reluctant to reject it, and there have been attempts to identify the trochilus with several species of plover, lapwing and sandpiper, and to explain its curious behaviour. Leo Africanus mentions the story uncritically in his Description of Africa. Topsell says that the crocodile reopens its mouth because the bird carries sharp thorns on its head which prick the crocodile's palate, and Andrew Leith Adams says that the reminder is conveyed to the crocodile by the horny spurs of the bird, which Alfred Brehm identified as the Egyptian plover.

In 1895 Henry Scherren quoted John Mason Cook, son of travel agent Thomas Cook, as reporting from Egypt that he had seen some spur-winged lapwings approach a crocodile, which opened its jaws for them:

Mr. J. M. Cook, of the celebrated tourist agency, when in Egypt in 1876, "watched one of these birds, and saw it deliberately go up to a crocodile, apparently asleep, which opened its jaws. The bird hopped in, and the crocodile closed its jaws. in what appeared to be a very short time, probably not more than a minute or two, the crocodile opened its jaws, and we saw the bird go down to the water's edge." There were several of these birds about, and Mr. Cook shot two of them, which Dr. Sclater identified as Spur-winged Plovers; so that the question as to what bird enters the mouth of the crocodile is now set at rest.

The Encyclopædia Britannica Eleventh Edition says that this bird picks parasites from the teeth and hide of the crocodile and supposes a connection with the spur-winged lapwing and the Egyptian plover. The English adventurer Major Chaplin Court Treatt made the following statement in 1931 based on his travels in Africa:

It is certainly amusing to newcomers and old hands alike, to watch some great crocodile sunning himself on a mud-bank, his cruel mouth gaping invitingly for the energetic crocodile bird to hop from one likely corner to another as he plays the part of an animated tooth-pick.

=== Skepticism ===
More recent research has not confirmed these observations, and there is no reliable evidence that this or any other species in fact has such a relationship with the crocodile. The written accounts are considered suspect by the biologist Thomas Howell. However, Cott records that spur-winged plovers are the birds that most often feed around basking crocodiles, and are tolerated by them. MacFarland and Reeder, reviewing the evidence in 1974, found that:

Extensive observations of Nile crocodiles in regular or occasional association with various species of potential cleaners (e.g. plovers, sandpipers, water dikkop) ... have resulted in only a few reports of sandpipers removing leeches from the mouth and gular scutes and snapping at insects along the reptile's body.

=== Proposed species ===
- Sandpiper
- Egyptian plover
- Spur-winged lapwing
- White-crowned lapwing

== Literary references ==
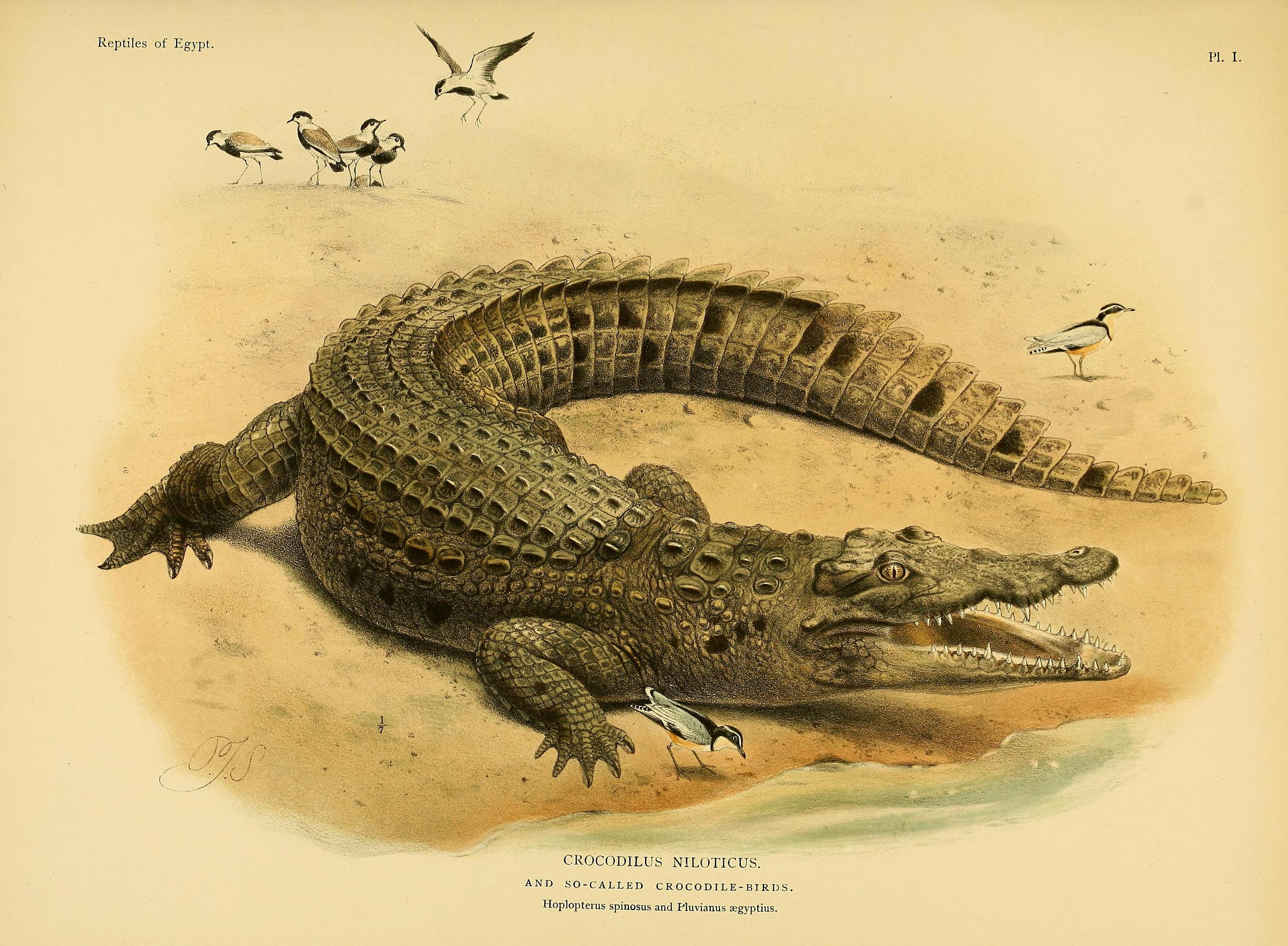
"Crocodilus Niloticus and so-called Crocodile-birds. Hoplopterus spinosus and Pluvianus ægyptius" (1898)

- John Pory's 1600 translation of Leo Africanus, A Geographical History of Africa, inspired a passage spoken by Flamineo in Webster's 1612 tragedy The White Devil (IV, ii, 224–235). The relationship between the crocodile and the little bird trochilus was frequently used by Elizabethans to symbolise ingratitude.
- Thomas Lovell Beddoes' sonnet "A Crocodile", published posthumously in 1851, follows the account of Herodotus.
- Boris Zakhoder published a short story called "Ma-Tari-Kari" (translated to English as "The Crocodile's Toothbrush") based on the legend in 1970. It was adapted into a cartoon called Tari the Bird in 1976.

== See also ==
- Cleaning symbiosis
- Commensalism
- Mutualism
- Ichneumon
- List of birds of Egypt
- Streamertail
- Willow warbler

== Bibliography ==
=== Ancient sources ===
- Arnott, Geoffrey W. (2007). Birds in the Ancient World from A to Z. London: Routledge.
- Bostock, John (1855). The Natural History of Pliny. Vol. 2. London: Henry G. Bohn.
- Cresswell, Richard (1887). Aristotle's History of Animals. London: George Bell & Sons.
- Liddell, Henry George; Scott, Robert (1940) "τροχίλος, ὁ, (τρέχω)". A Greek–English Lexicon. Oxford: Clarendon Press.
- Rawlinson, George (1910). The History of Herodotus. London: J. M. Dent & Sons.
- Scholfield, A. F. (1958). Aelian: On the Characteristics of Animals. Vol. 1. London: Heinemann.

=== Modern sources ===
- Adams, Andrew Leith (January 1864). "Notes and Observations on the Birds of Egypt and Nubia". The Ibis 6(21): 1–36.
- Anderson, John (1898). Zoology of Egypt. Vol. 1: Reptilia and Batrachia. London: Bernard Quaritch. pp. 18–22.
- Breiner, Laurence A. (March 1979). "The Career of the Cockatrice". Isis 70(1): 30–47.
- Canfield, Michael R. (2015). Theodore Roosevelt in the Field. London: University of Chicago Press.
- Cott, Hugh B. (1961). "Scientific results of an inquiry into the ecology and economic status of the Nile Crocodile (Crocodilus niloticus) in Uganda and Northern Rhodesia". Transactions of the Zoological Society of London, 29(4): 211–356.
- Court Treatt, Chaplin (1931). Out of the Beaten Track: a Narrative of Travel in Little Known Africa. New York: E. P. Dutton & Co.
- Crawfurd, Raymond (January 1919). "Legends and Lore of the Healing Art: II". The Lotus Magazine 10(1): 25–30.
- Howell, Thomas R. (1979). Breeding Biology of the Egyptian Plover, Pluvianus aegyptius. Berkeley: University of California Press.
- Jones, Eldred D. (1962). "African figures in the Elizabethan and Jacobean drama", Durham E-Theses Online, Durham University.
- MacFarland, Craig G.; Reeder, W. G. (1974). "Cleaning symbiosis involving Galapagos tortoises and two species of Darwin's finches". Zeitschrift für Tierpsychologie. 34(5): 464–483.
- Malkiel, David (January 2016). "The Rabbi and the Crocodile: Interrogating Nature in the Late Quattrocento". Speculum 91(1): 115–148.
- McCartney, Eugene S. (January 1943). "Review: [Untitled]". The Classical Journal 83(4): 230–232.
- Métraux, Alexandre (February 2016). "On Some Issues of Human-Animal Studies: An Introduction". Science in Context. 29(1): 1–10.
- Newton, Alfred (1911). "Plover" . In Chisholm, Hugh (ed.). Encyclopædia Britannica. Vol. 21 (11th ed.). Cambridge University Press. pp. 852–853.
- Scherren, Henry (1895). Popular History of Animals for Young People. Philadelphia: J. B. Lippincott Co.; London: Cassell & Co., Ltd.
- Wood, Evelyn (1911). "Egypt/1 Modern Egypt" . In Chisholm, Hugh (ed.). Encyclopædia Britannica. Vol. 9 (11th ed.). Cambridge University Press. pp. 21–39.
