= Isabella Fyvie Mayo =

Scottish poet, novelist, reformer (1843–1914)

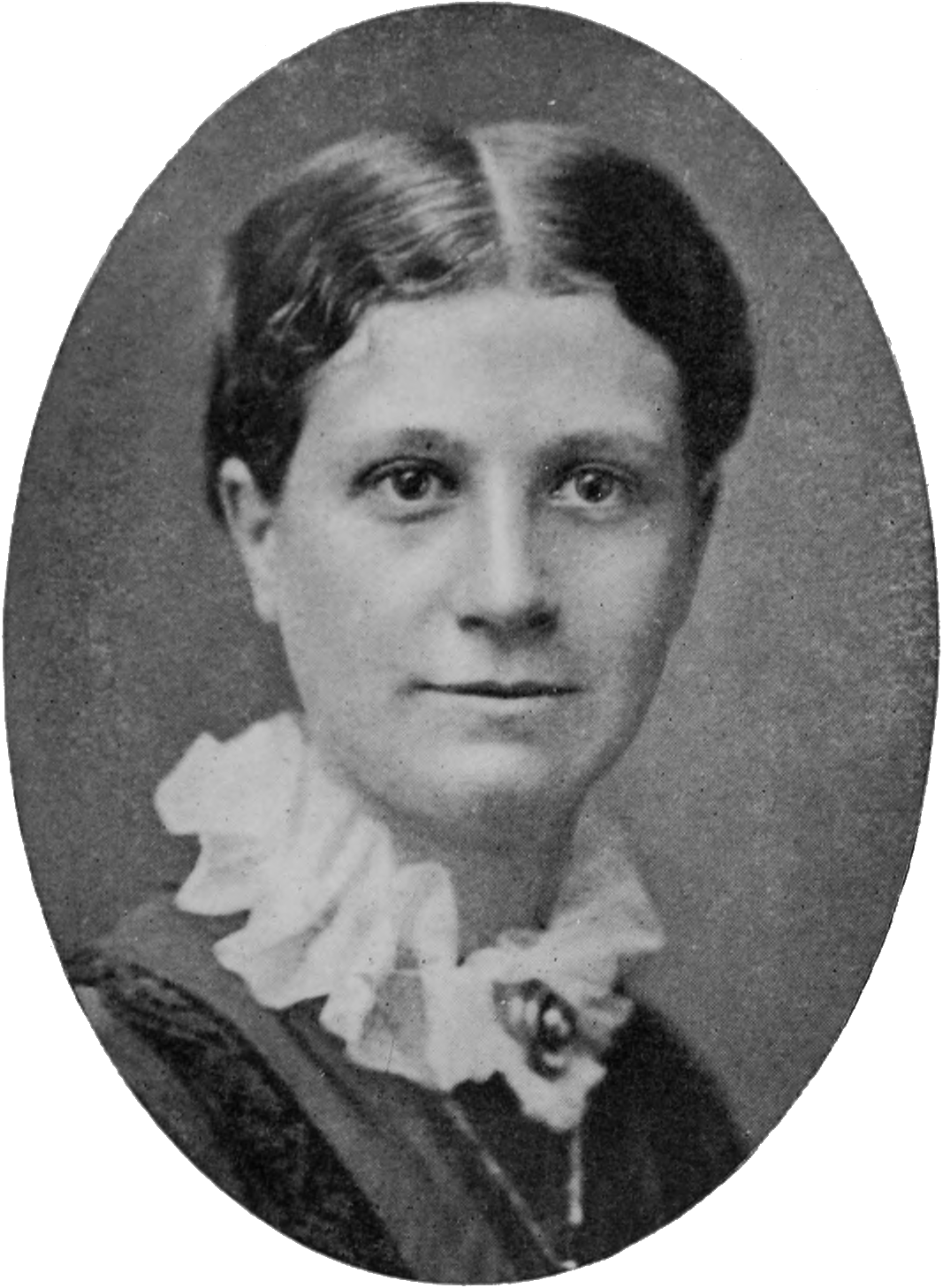
- Born: Isabella Fyvie; 10 December 1843; London, England
- Died: 13 May 1914 (aged 70); Aberdeen, Scotland
- Occupations: poet, novelist, suffragist, reformer
- Spouse: John Ryall Mayo (m. 1870; died 1877)
- Relatives: Alexander Hislop; Stephen Hislop
- Writing career
- Pen name: Edward Garrett

Isabella Fyvie Mayo (pen name, Edward Garrett; 10 December 1843 – 13 May 1914) was a Scottish writer, poet, suffragist, and reformer. With the help of friends, Fyvie Mayo published poems and stories, using the pseudonym, Edward Garrett. Fyvie Mayo spent most of her life living in Aberdeen, where she was the first woman elected to a public board. Fyvie Mayo was described as an "ethical anarchist, pacifist, anti-imperialist and anti-racist campaigner"; and her home was said to be "an asylum for Asian Indians".

== Early years and education ==
Isabella Fyvie was born on 10 December 1843 in London of Scottish parents George Fyvie and Margaret Thomson. As a child, her father told her the legends of Buchan, along with stories of his father's farm which the family had occupied for three hundred years. Her father's people were staunch Scottish Episcopalians, one of them being the Dean of Moray and Ross. Her mother's paternal ancestors belonged to the Border country and were all of the nonconforming religion, with her near relatives including Rev Alexander Hislop, Free Church, Arbroath, author of The Two Babylons, and the Rev Stephen Hislop, missionary and scientist in India. On the maternal side, her mother's family belonged to an old Aberdeen family of the Established Kirk.

Younger by many years than the rest of the family, she was educated at a day school, where she took many prizes.

== Career ==
Fyvie Mayo's first impulse to literary work came from a relative, then a student at King's College London, who saw promise in her school essays and occasional poems, and suggested a literary career. For seven years, Fyvie Mayo worked without being paid; and it was not until her "Occupations of a Retired Life" appeared in The Sunday Magazine that she felt encouraged to pursue her desire of a literary career. Fyvie Mayo was only sixteen when she began working to pay off a family debt. It enabled Fyvie Mayo to make her books helpful to others, and especially to those who were harassed by doubt. At the age of 18, Fyvie Mayo made the acquaintance of Irish novelist Anna Maria Hall whose encouragement and practical help were of great use to her.

In 1870, Isabella married John Ryall Mayo, a London lawyer, who in 1854, became the first mayor of Yeovil. Fyvie Mayo's husband was in delicate health, and this led to a Canadian tour, followed by residence in Surrey, of which there are glimpses in some of her stories. In 1877, Fyvie Mayo became a widow, left with one son. In the following year, Fyvie Mayo left London, which had then grown unendurable to her. At first, she was in danger of lapsing into invalidism, but her health improved after moving to Aberdeen.

== Women's Suffrage ==
In Aberdeen, Fyvie Mayo became involved in the debates in the women's suffrage movement between those she called the 'suffragists of the old school' and the militant WSPU, and the "singularly effete" local activists linked so closely to the Women's Liberal Association that it was limited to "one shade of political opinion." Fyvie Mayo favoured women's suffrage and spoke out for women's right to vote, but her approach to the campaign changed over the years 1860 - 1912, and her writings both reflected and criticised the changes in the movement, often regarding the middle class activists making choices that poorer women could not afford to make. Fyvie Mayo may have spoken to Mahatma Gandhi, with whom she corresponded, about the tactics of the women's movement.

It is said that her writing and that of Elizabeth Mayhew Edmonds made Victorian readers aware of the leading role women played in the Greek War of Independence raising questions of gender and the role of women.

Fyvie Mayo had a range of exchanges, as convenor of the local WSPU events, with Emmeline Pankhurst and Helen Fraser, and in the local press with someone calling themselves 'Anti-Suffragette'. The collection of some of her letters are held in the University of Aberdeen archive (women's suffrage) and Fyvie Mayo was nominated for a blue memorial plaque in Aberdeen.

== Personal life ==
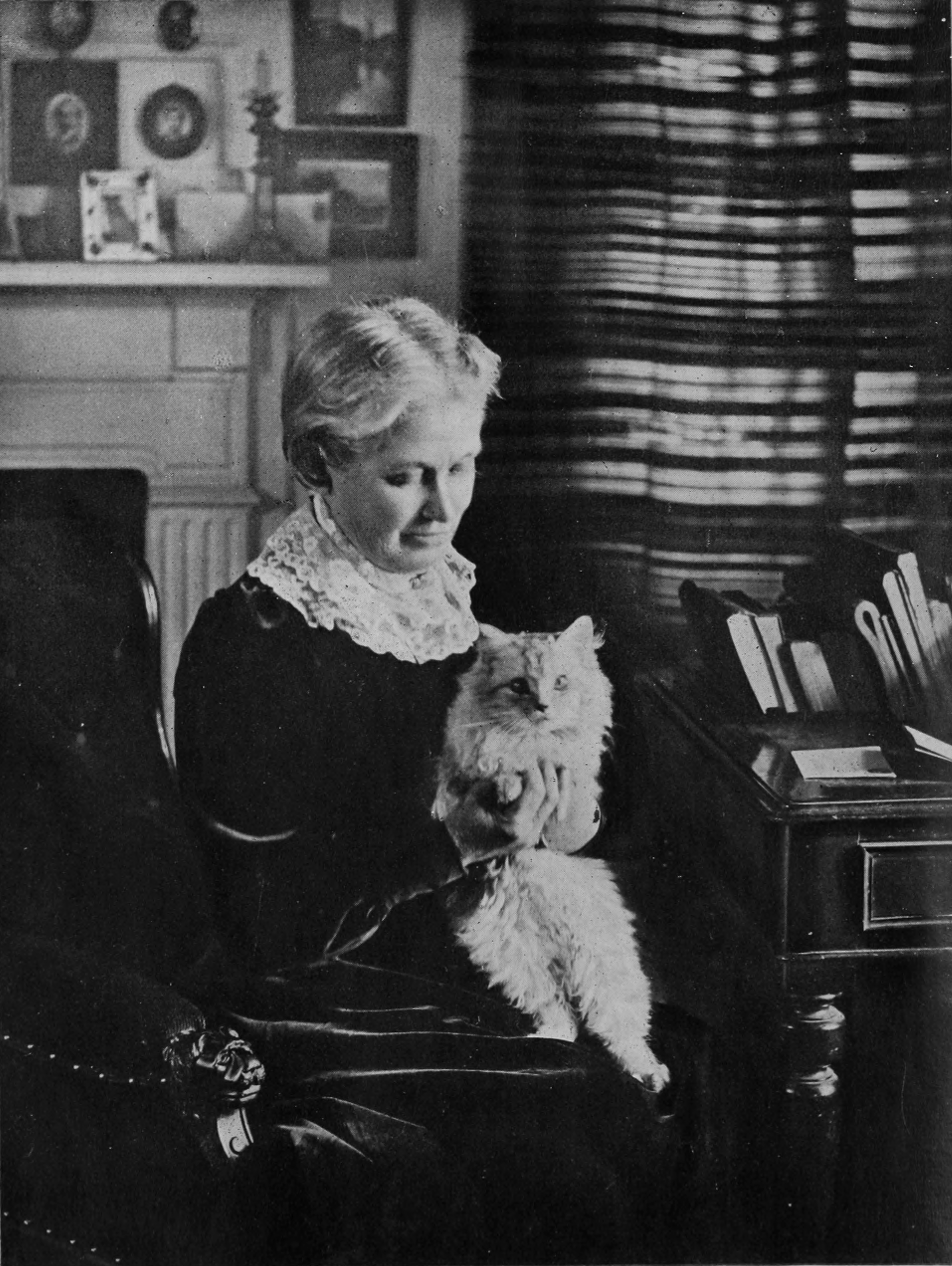
Isabella Fyvie Mayo

Fyvie Mayo preferred to be known not as 'Mrs' or by her husband's name, as was the convention, but as Isabella Fyvie Mayo although she is best known by her nom de plume, Edward Garrett, in the pages of The Sunday Magazine, Good Words, The Quiver, Sunday at Home, The Girl's Own Paper, Pall Mall Gazette, and others.

George Ferdinands, a Sri Lankan whom Fyvie Mayo considered an adopted son, shared her Scottish home till her death. Fyvie Mayo died in Aberdeen on 13 May 1914 of cancer and left her estate to Ferdinands.

== Style and themes ==
Fyvie Mayo's (as Edward Garrett) popular tales and sketches were charming and natural in detail, and showed that her sympathies were wide, while her narratives were drawn with power and accuracy. Her ballads were remarkable for their simplicity and those lightly marked rhymes peculiar to that style of verse. She also took easily to the measures of the sonnet, and her utterances possessed directness of thought, as well as depth of imagination and artistic finish.

== Selected works ==
- Occupations of a Retired Life (1868)
- The Crust of the Cake (1869)
- Seen and Heard (1871)
- Premiums paid to Experience (1872)
- Crooked Places (1873)
- By Still Waters (1874)
- Doing and Dreaming (1876)
- Not by Bread Alone (1890)
- Her Day of Service (1892)
- A Black Diamond (1893)
- Rab Bethuene's Double (1894)
- A Daughter of the Klephts (1897)
- A Nine Days Wonder (1898)
- Other People's Stairs (1898)
- Crystal Joyce (1899)
- Recollections of Fifty Years, autobiography (1910)
