= Trochilus (disambiguation) =

Trochilus is a genus of hummingbirds which comprises the streamertails.

Trochilus or Trochilos may also refer to:

- Trochilus (mythology), a member of the Argive royal house in Greek mythology
- Trochilus (crocodile bird), a legendary bird, first described by Herodotus

== See also ==
- Phylloscopus trochilus, the binomial name of the willow warbler.
