= Lionard =

Lionard may refer to:

== Zoology ==
- Lionard, a panthera-lion hybrid

== Given name ==
- Lionard Pajoy, a Colombian professional footballer
