= Encyclopedic Dictionary =

The Encyclopedic Dictionary was a large dictionary published from 1879 to 1888 edited by Robert Hunter. It was a 14 volume project, comparable to the Oxford English Dictionary or Webster's International Dictionary and contained "a considerable amount of encyclopedic information", though was not technically an encyclopedia.

The dictionary would be republished under a number of different names including Lloyds Encyclopedic Dictionary, after the publisher who issued it in 1895; Imperial Dictionary and Encyclopedia and International Dictionary and Cyclopedia during the 1900s when it was published by the Syndicate Publishing Company.
