= Elizabeth Mayhew Edmonds =

English translator and writer (1821–1907)

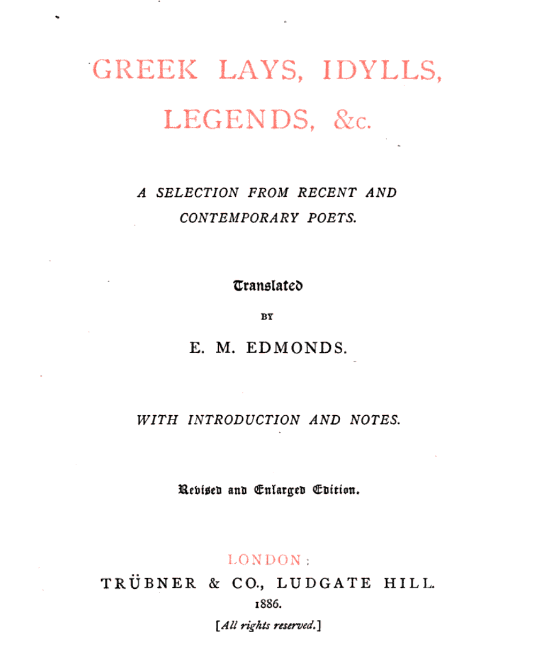
Greek Lays, Idylls, Legends etc. trans. by Edmonds

Elizabeth Mayhew Edmonds (1821 – 20 January 1907) was an English writer active in the 1880s who wrote about modern Greece. Her focus on publishing in magazines and journals as well as in books brought modern Greek life to increased prominence in Britain.

== Early life ==
Elizabeth Mayhew Edmonds was born and baptised as Elizabeth Waller on 19 January 1821 at St Mary Magdalen, Bermondsey. Her father, John Waller, was a former Royal Navy officer and her mother, Susanna Green, was the daughter of a surgeon from Hoxne, Suffolk. Elizabeth was one of seven children, and was educated at home by her elder brother, the artist John Waller. He introduced her to great literature in English, French, Italian and Latin. She was also encouraged by her cousin, the writer Mary Matilda Betham to write poetry.

In December 1849, Elizabeth married Augustus Robert Edmonds. He worked as a lighterman, foreign merchant and a master barge builder. They moved to Blackheath, London, and he encouraged her to return to writing, and to learning ancient Greek. She became interested in modern Greek.

== Career ==
In 1880, Edmonds travelled alone to Athens. She said the trip was for both her health and to continue her study of the modern Greek language. Initially staying at a hotel and then with an expatriate British family, she eventually moved to the home of a Professor Kerasos of the University of Athens. In 1881, Edmonds published her account of her time in Athens as Fair Athens under the pen name E. M. Edmonds. The book combined observations of the habits and customs of the modern city and of the Greek way of life including their religion, domestic arrangements and cuisine. She wrote about the reactions she received as a lone woman traveller, including the shock of the hotel porter, and the response of a group on a trip to Megara.

Whilst in Athens, Edmonds had made contact with several contemporary Greek poets: Georgios Vizyenos, Georgios Drosinis, Nikolaos Politis, and Grigorios Xenopoulo. She remained in touch after returning to Britain, and began publishing translations of their work in English. She published a collection of translations in 1885, Greek Lays, Idylls, Legends &c, which ran to two editions.

Edmonds became a prolific translator of modern Greek work, and also wrote over thirty articles about modern Greece between 1881 and 1897. Oscar Wilde reviewed her translations in the Pall Mall Gazette and commissioned her to write for the Woman's World magazine. Her 1892 translation of Theodoros Kolokotronis's memoirs remains the only complete version in English. She promoted the cause of an independent Greece. Her writing and that of Isabella Fyvie Mayo made Victorian readers aware of the role women played in the Greek War of Independence raising questions of gender and the role of women.

Edmonds also wrote three popular novels between 1888 and 1898 which explored the tension between the creative and domestic demands on women, and the gendered expectations on them. In Mary Myles (1888), the eponymous protagonist is an excellent scholar who has to work as a governess. In Amygdala: A Tale of the Greek Revolution (1894), the lead character, Irene, counters her father's disappointment at her being a girl by fighting in the Greek war of independence.

== Selected works ==
- Fair Athens (1881) - travel writing
- Greek Lays, Idylls, Legends &c (1885) - translations
- Mary Myles (1888) - fiction
- Amygdala: A Tale of the Greek Revolution (1894) - fiction
- Jabez Nutyard (1898) - fiction

== Death ==
Edmonds died on 20 January 1907 in Blackheath, and was buried at the now destroyed St German's Church in Blackheath.
