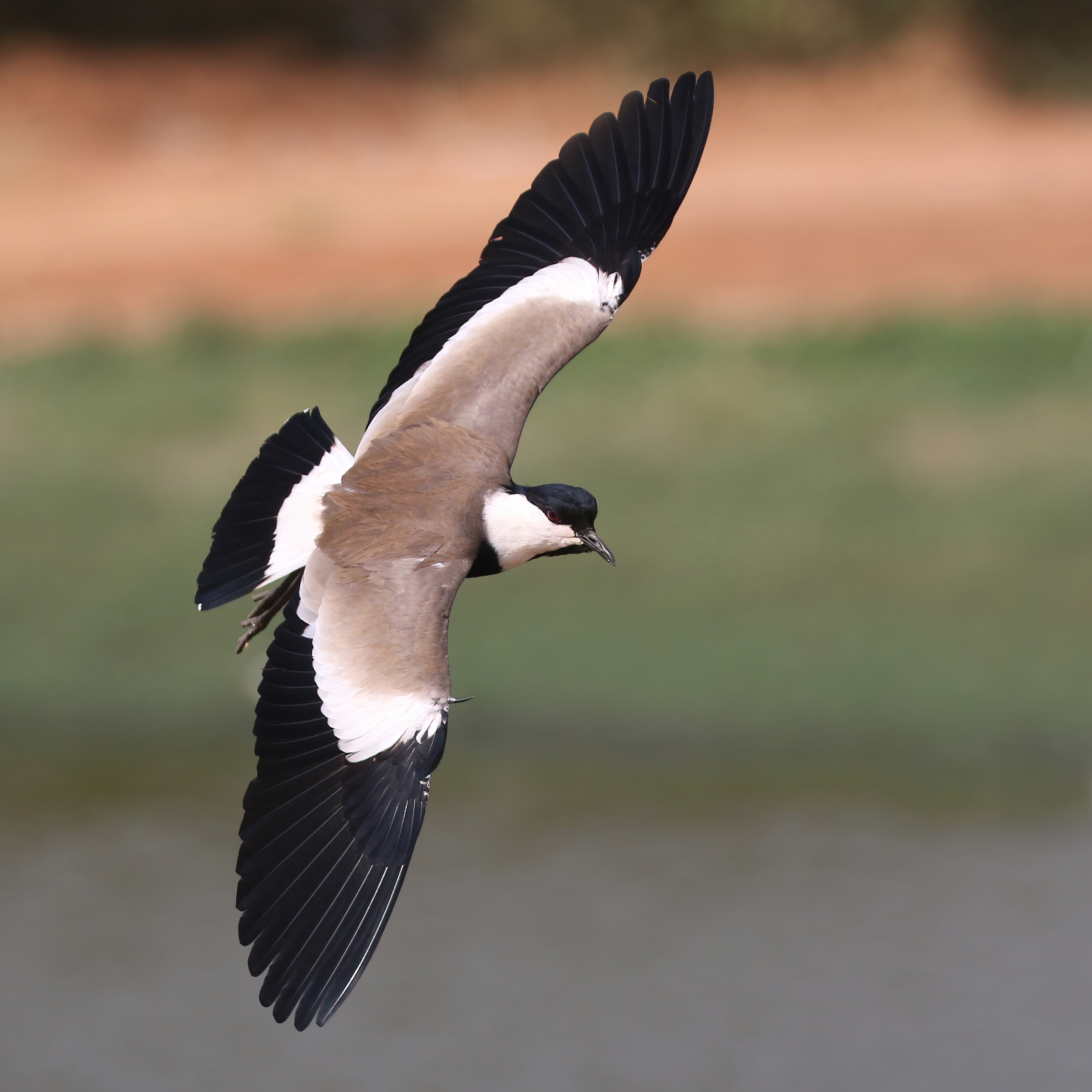
- Upper side of wings - note the spurs on the leading edge of the carpal joint

Conservation status
- Least Concern (IUCN 3.1)

Scientific classification
- Kingdom: Animalia
- Phylum: Chordata
- Class: Aves
- Order: Charadriiformes
- Family: Charadriidae
- Genus: Vanellus
- Species: V. spinosus

Binomial name
- Vanellus spinosus (Linnaeus, 1758)

Synonyms
- Charadrius spinosus Linnaeus, 1758; Hoplopterus spinosus (Linnaeus, 1758)

Audio
- Calls recorded at Lake Turkana, Kenya

= Spur-winged lapwing =

Species of bird

The spur-winged lapwing or spur-winged plover (Vanellus spinosus) is a lapwing species, one of a group of largish waders in the family Charadriidae.

== Taxonomy ==
The spur-winged lapwing was formally described in 1758 by the Swedish naturalist Carl Linnaeus in the tenth edition of his Systema Naturae. He placed it with the plovers in the genus Charadrius and coined the binomial name Charadrius spinosus. He specified the type locality as Egypt. The specific epithet is from Latin meaning "thorny" (from spina meaning "thorn"). Linnaeus based his account on a description by the Swedish naturalist Fredrik Hasselquist that had been published in 1757. The spur-winged lapwing is now one of 23 species placed in the genus Vanellus that was introduced in 1760 by the French naturalist Mathurin Jacques Brisson. The species is monotypic: no subspecies are recognised.

== Description ==
The spur-winged lapwing is a medium-large wader with a black crown, chest, foreneck stripe and tail. The face, the rest of the neck and belly are white and the wings and back are light brown. The bill and legs are black. It has a loud did-he-do-it call. The bird's common name refers to a small claw or spur hidden in each of its wings.

== Distribution ==
The spur-winged lapwing breeds around the eastern Mediterranean, and in a wide band from sub-Saharan west Africa to Arabia. The Greek and Turkish breeders are migratory, but other populations are resident. The species is declining in its northern range, but is abundant in much of tropical Africa, being seen at almost any wetland habitat in its range. The spur-winged lapwing is one of the species to which the Agreement on the Conservation of African-Eurasian Migratory Waterbirds applies.

In eastern and southern Africa the species has seen a range increase, entering Zambia for the first time in 1999 and spreading south and west.

== Behaviour and ecology ==
This species has a preference for marshes and similar freshwater wetland habitats. The food of the spur-winged lapwing is insects and other invertebrates, which are picked from the ground.

It lays four blotchy yellowish eggs on a ground scrape. The spur-winged lapwing is known to sometimes use the wing-claws in an attack on animals and, rarely, people, who get too close to the birds' exposed offspring.

== Supposed cleaning symbiosis ==
The "spur-winged plover" was identified by Henry Scherren as the "trochilus" bird said by the Greek historian Herodotus to be involved in what would now be called a cleaning symbiosis with the Nile crocodile. However, there is no reliable evidence that this or any other species in fact has such a relationship, although Cott does record that spur-winged plovers are the birds that most often feed around basking crocodiles, and are tolerated by them.

== Gallery ==
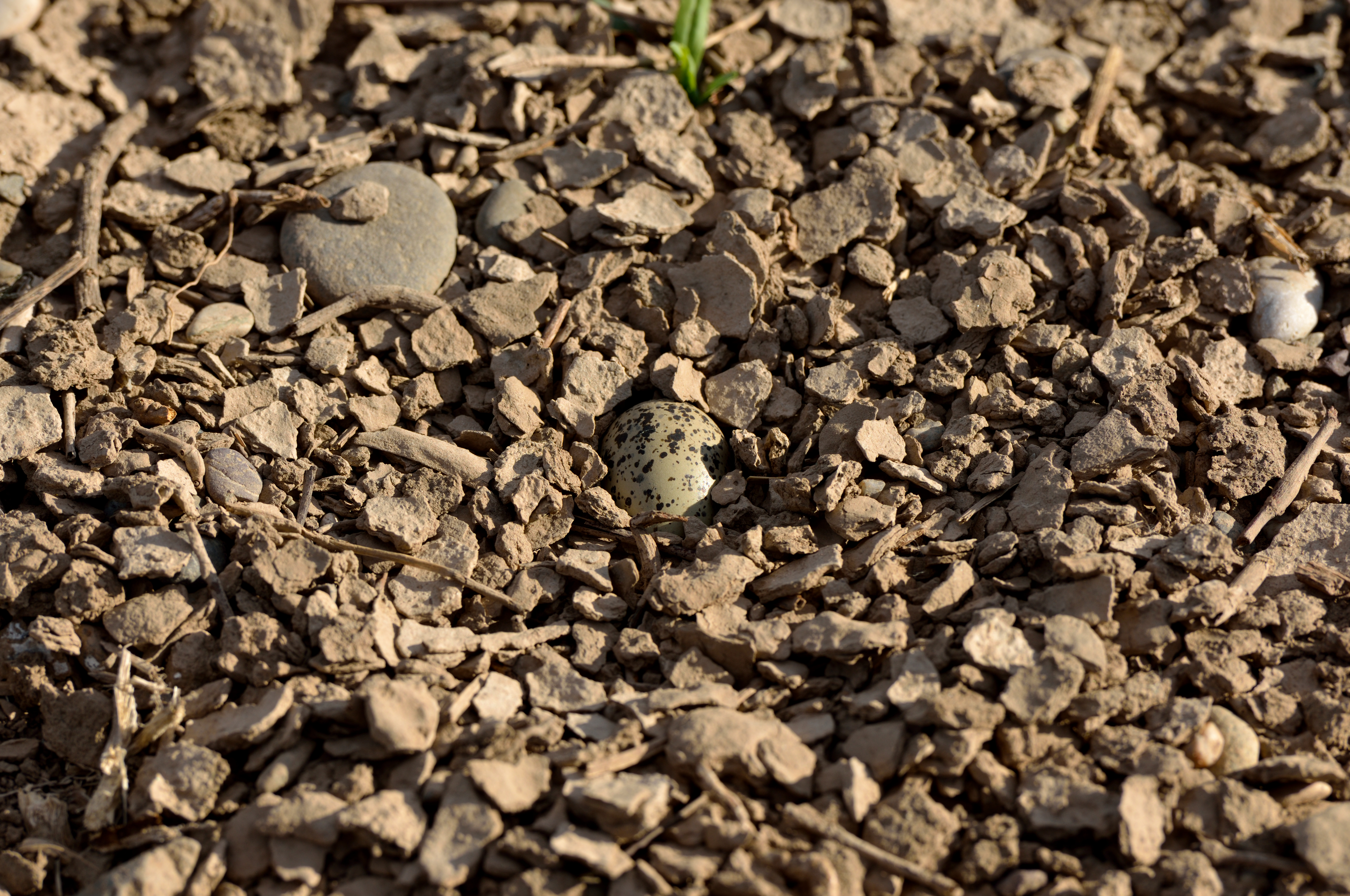
Egg in nest

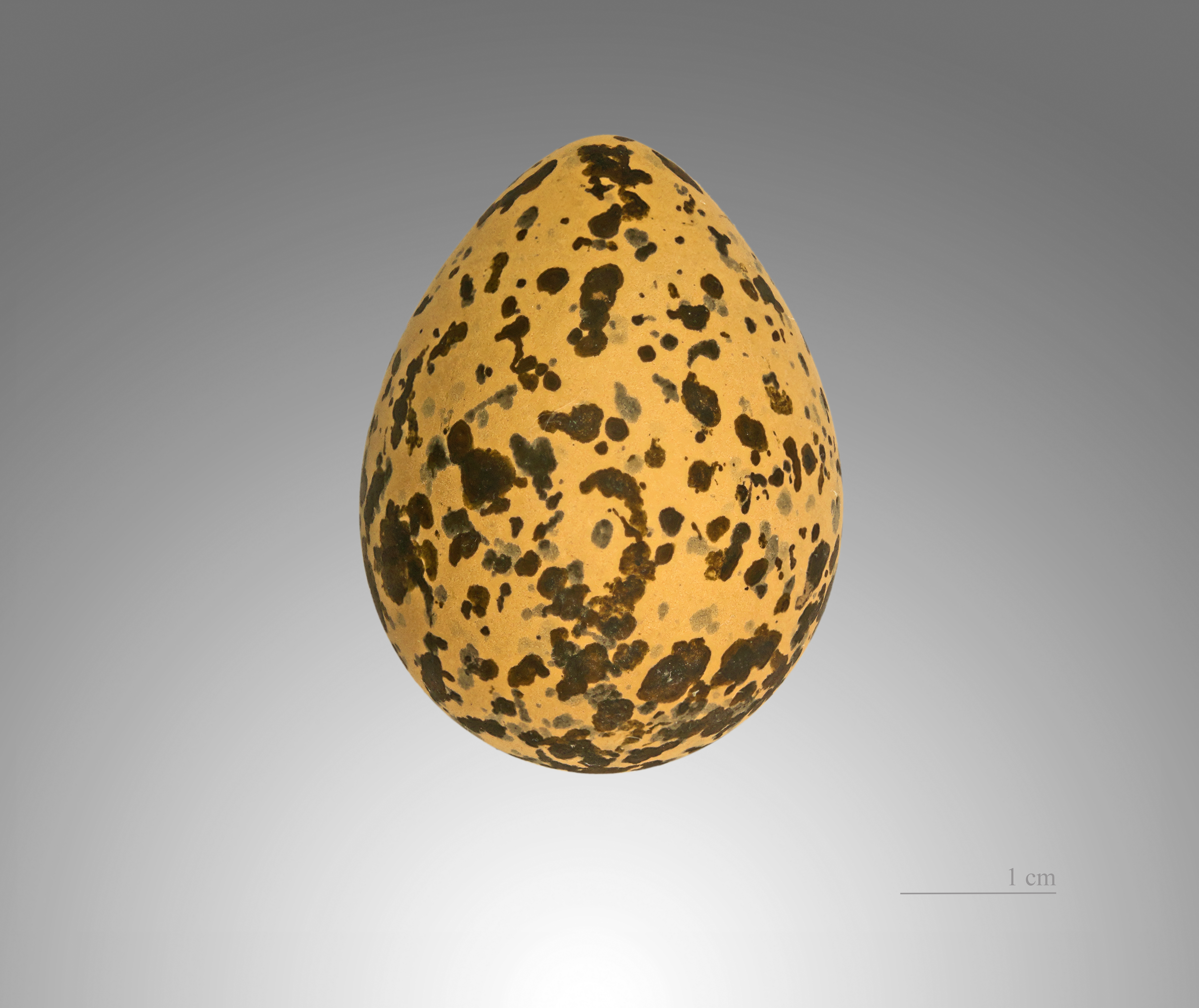
Egg - MHNT

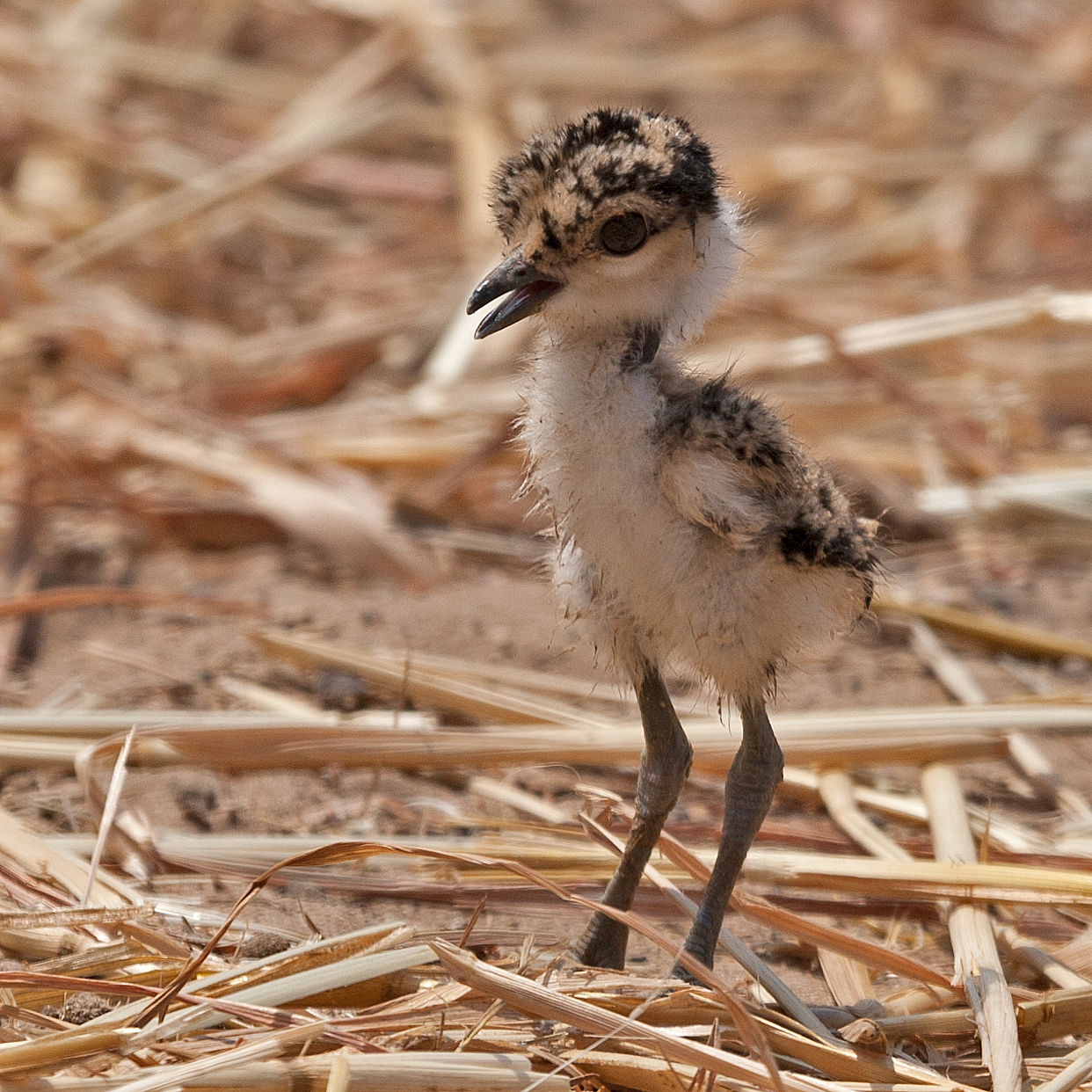
Chick

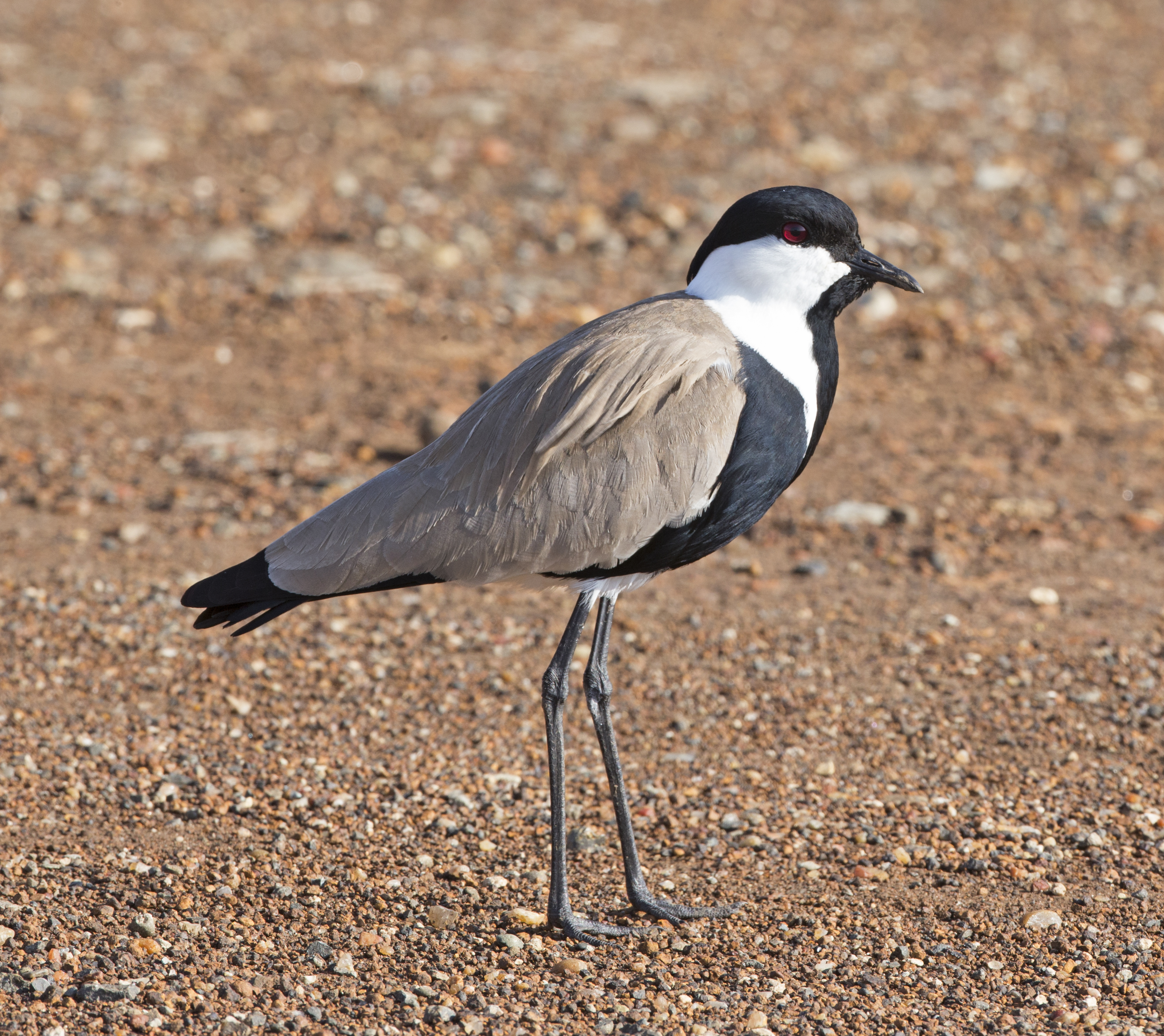
Adult

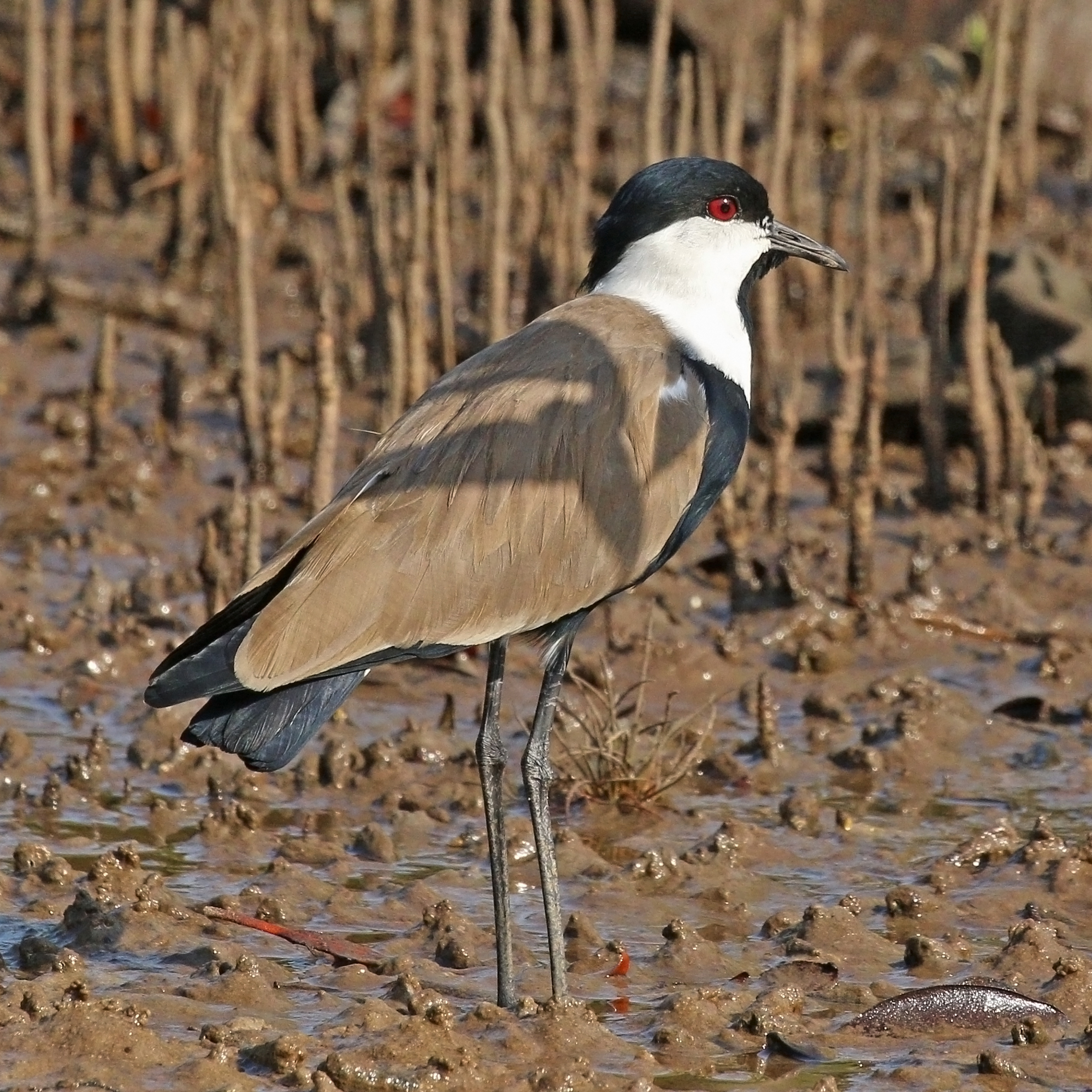
A spur-winged lapwing in the Gambia

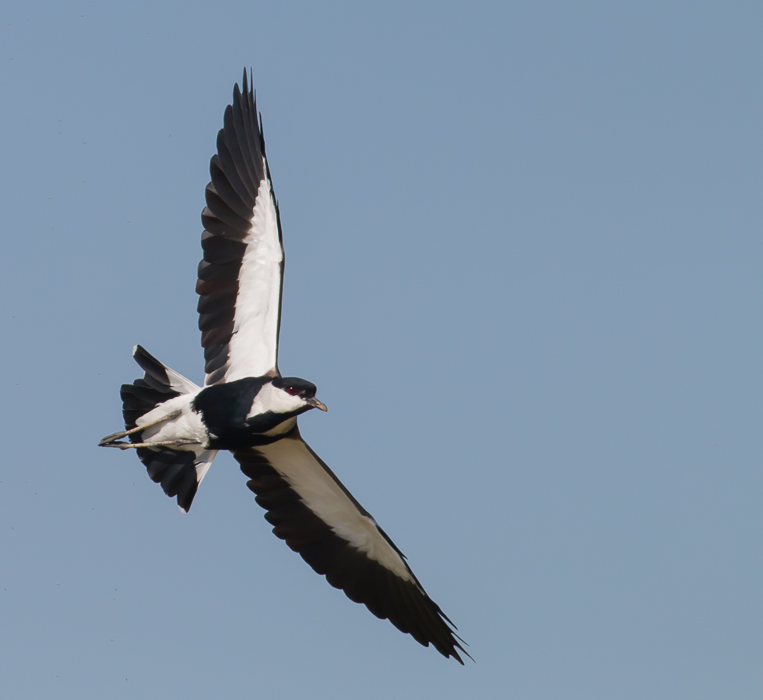
Underside of wings

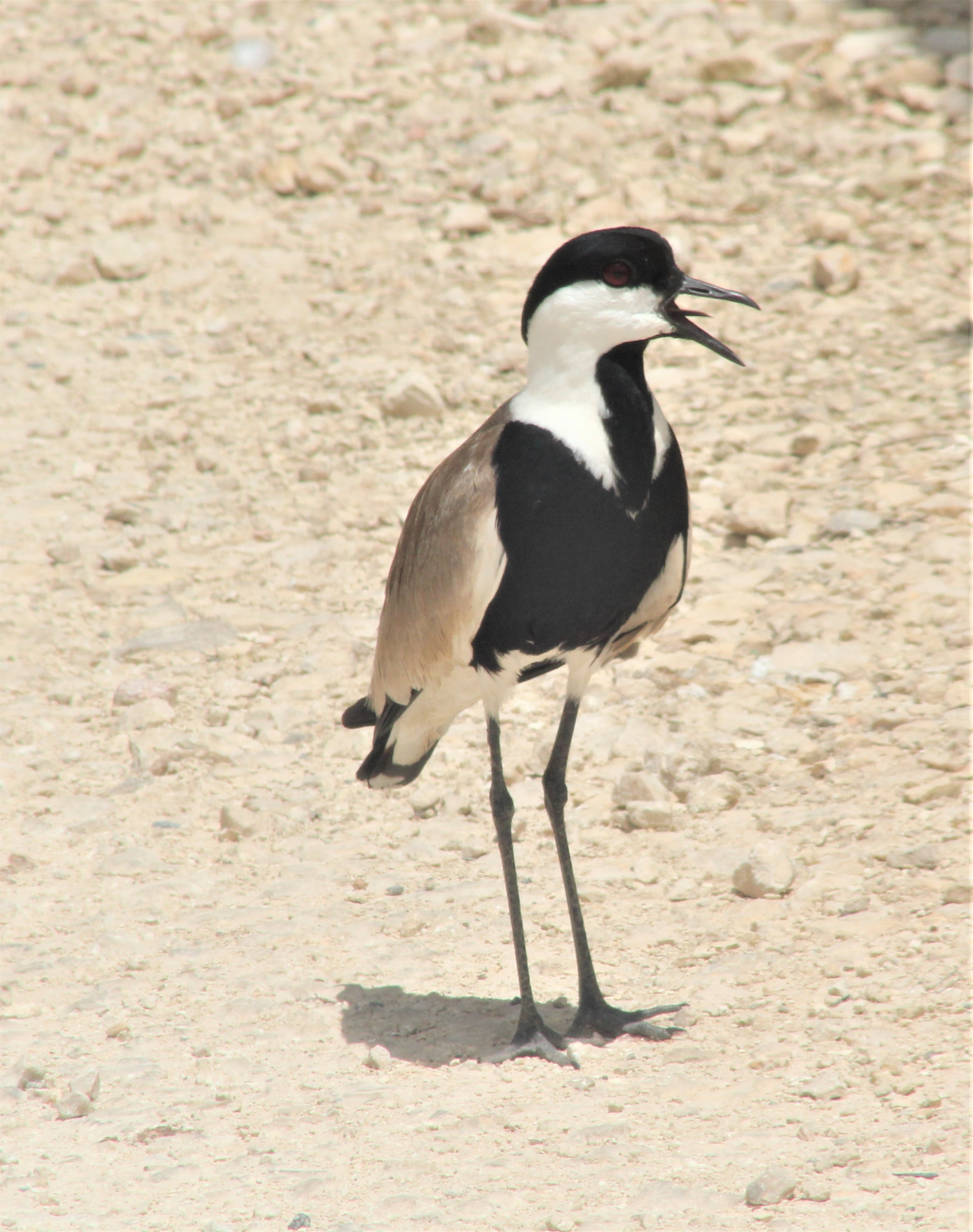
In Northern Israel, squawking at anyone or anything that came near its chick - showing its tongue.

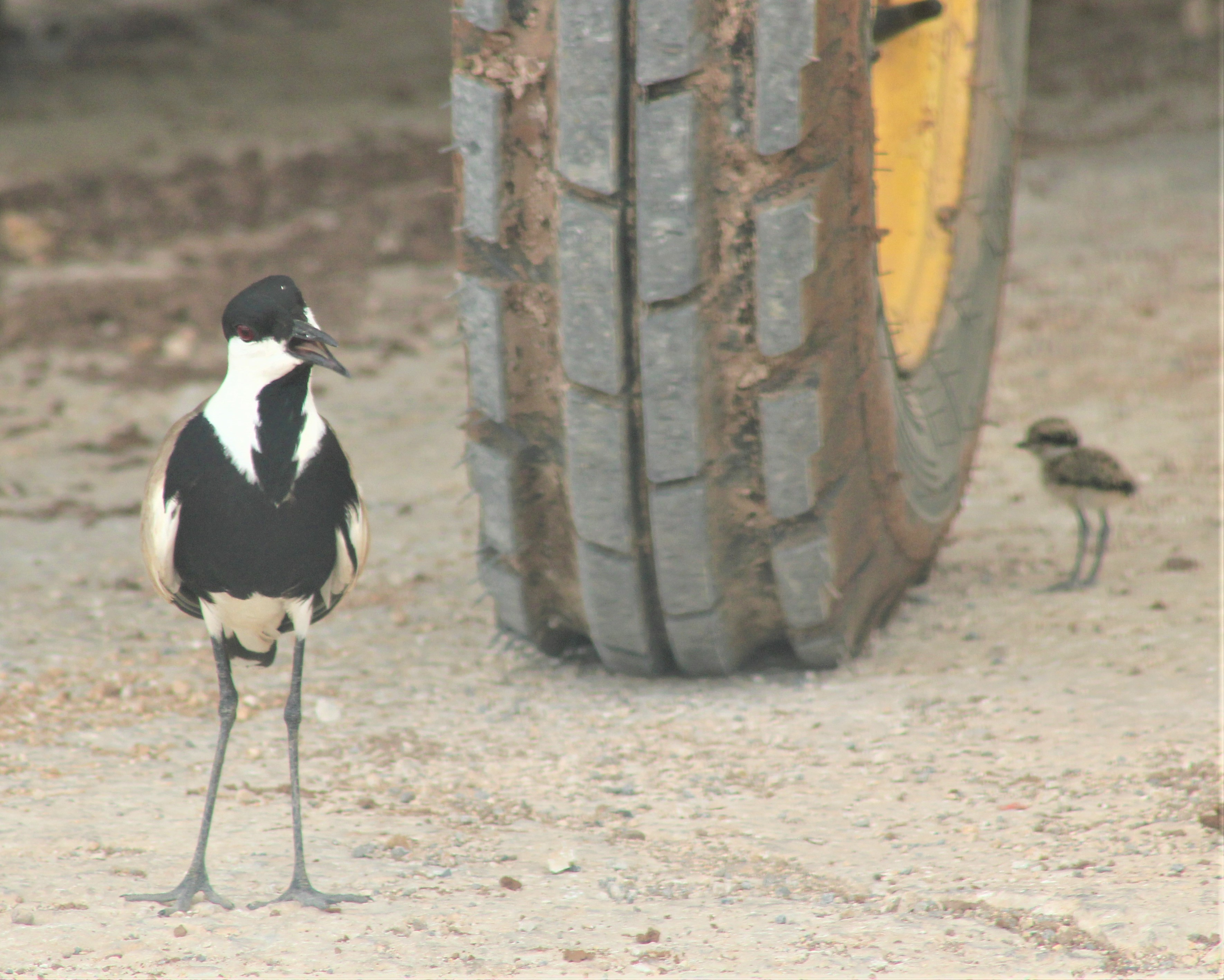
In Northern Israel squawking at anyone (or anything) who came near its chick, which can be seen taking cover behind the tractor wheel.
