= Henry Scherren =

British naturalist (1843–1911)

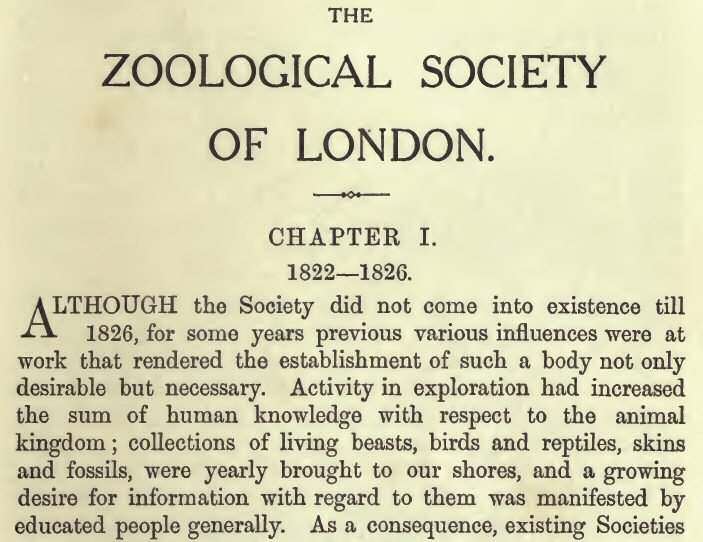
- The magisterial start of Scherren's 1905 book on the Zoological Society of London
- Born: 10 February 1843; Weymouth
- Died: 25 April 1911 (aged 68); London
- Occupation: Author
- Known for: Popularizing zoology

Henry James Wilson Scherren (10 February 1843 – 25 April 1911), usually known as Henry Scherren or in encyclopaedia articles as H. Sc. was the author of various books on natural history for adults and children, with notable illustrations including some in colour, and a contributor to the Encyclopædia Britannica on natural history topics. He was a fellow of the Zoological Society of London, of which he wrote a magnificent but inaccurate history.

== Life ==
Scherren's family came from Weymouth in Dorset. The son of a bookseller and printer, he became a compositor and moved to London. After being educated at the new St. Joseph's Foreign Missionary College started by the Mill Hill Missionaries, he joined the Catholic Carthusian monastic order in France. However, he abandoned the order in his mid-thirties to return to secular life, going on to work on the editorial staff of Messrs. Cassell & Co. in London for two decades. In the mid-1890s he moved, with his wife Anna, into a three-storey terraced house (9, Cavendish Road) in the newly built South Harringay estate in north London, living there for the rest of his life.

Scherren assisted Robert Hunter with his 7-volume Encyclopedic Dictionary (1879–88). In 1891 he wrote to Nature about a finding of a rare "hydrozoon", Cordylophora lacustris. He collected insect specimens which he shared with other naturalists.

Scherren was a Fellow of the Zoological Society of London. He was Assistant Natural History Editor of The Field. He was the author of several books on natural history for both adults and children, including Popular History of Animals for Young People and Ponds and Rock Pools.

He contributed various articles on hybrid animals including Bears, and wrote energetically about hybrids such as the Pumapard.

In 1905, Scherren published his history of the Zoological Society of London. It began:

ALTHOUGH the Society did not come into existence till 1826, for some years previous various influences were at work that rendered the establishment of such a body not only desirable but necessary. Activity in exploration had increased the sum of human knowledge with respect to the animal kingdom; collections of living beasts, birds and reptiles, skins and fossils, were yearly brought to our shores, and a growing desire for information with regard to them was manifested by educated people generally.

Scherren's history of the ZSL was criticised as inaccurate by John Bastin:

There is so much confusion about the origins of the Zoological Society of London... The source of most of the errors can be traced to Henry Scherren's "A short history of the [ZSL]" published in 1901 and his larger work [The ZSL] which was published four years later. Scherren's lack of diligence in searching the early records of the Society was critically commented on by P. Chalmers Mitchell ... (1929), but the same charge can be levelled with equal justice against his own work...

Scherren contributed to several natural history articles for the 1911 Encyclopædia Britannica (where he is recorded by his initials "H. Sc."), including "Platypus".

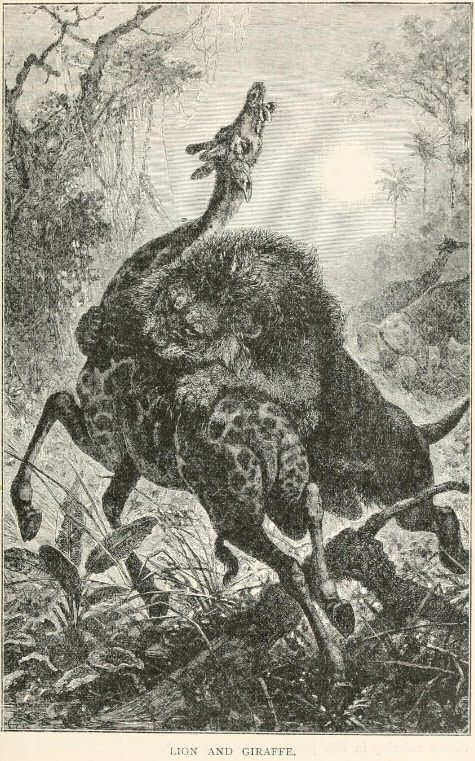
Lion and Giraffe from Scherren's 1895 Popular History of Animals for Young People

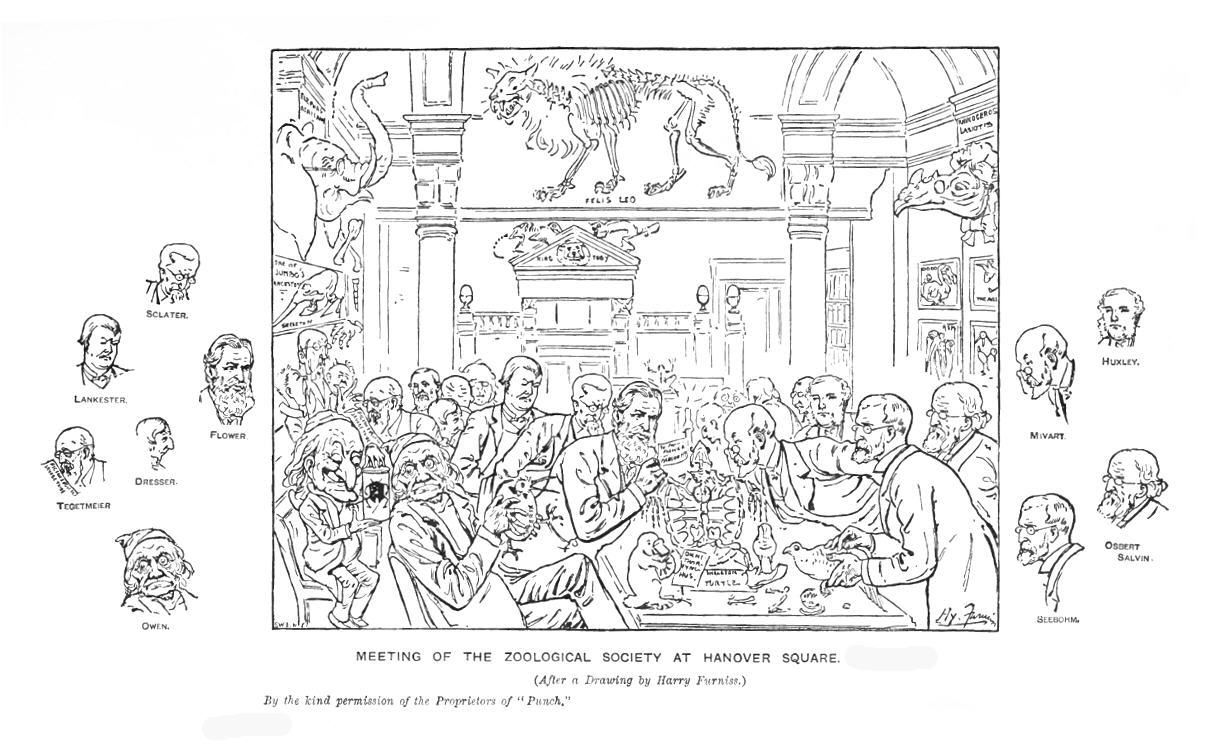
A cartoon of a meeting of the Zoological Society of London from Scherren's 1905 book; the zoologists seem quite as interesting as the animal specimens

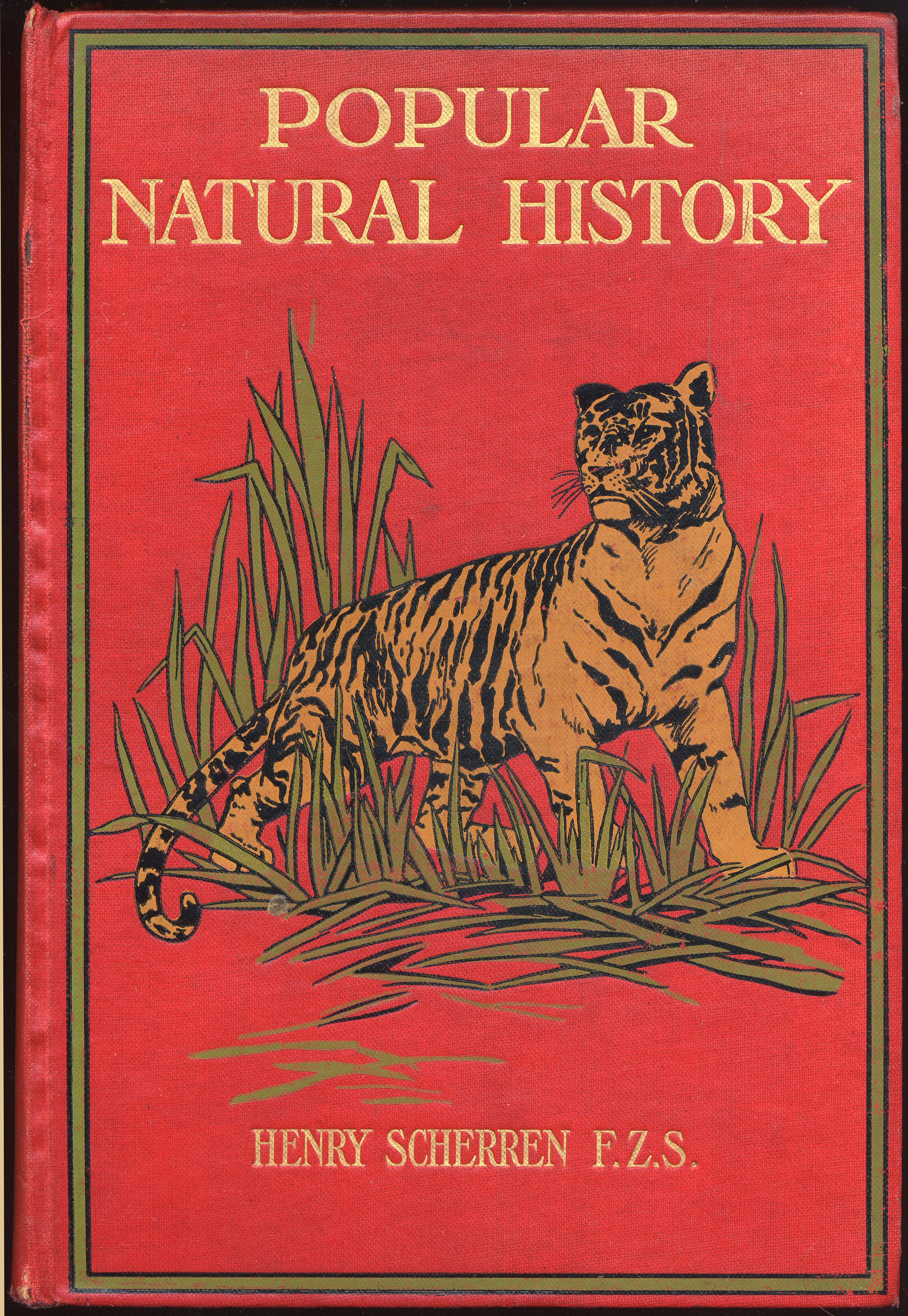
Front cover of Popular Natural History, 1906

== Works ==
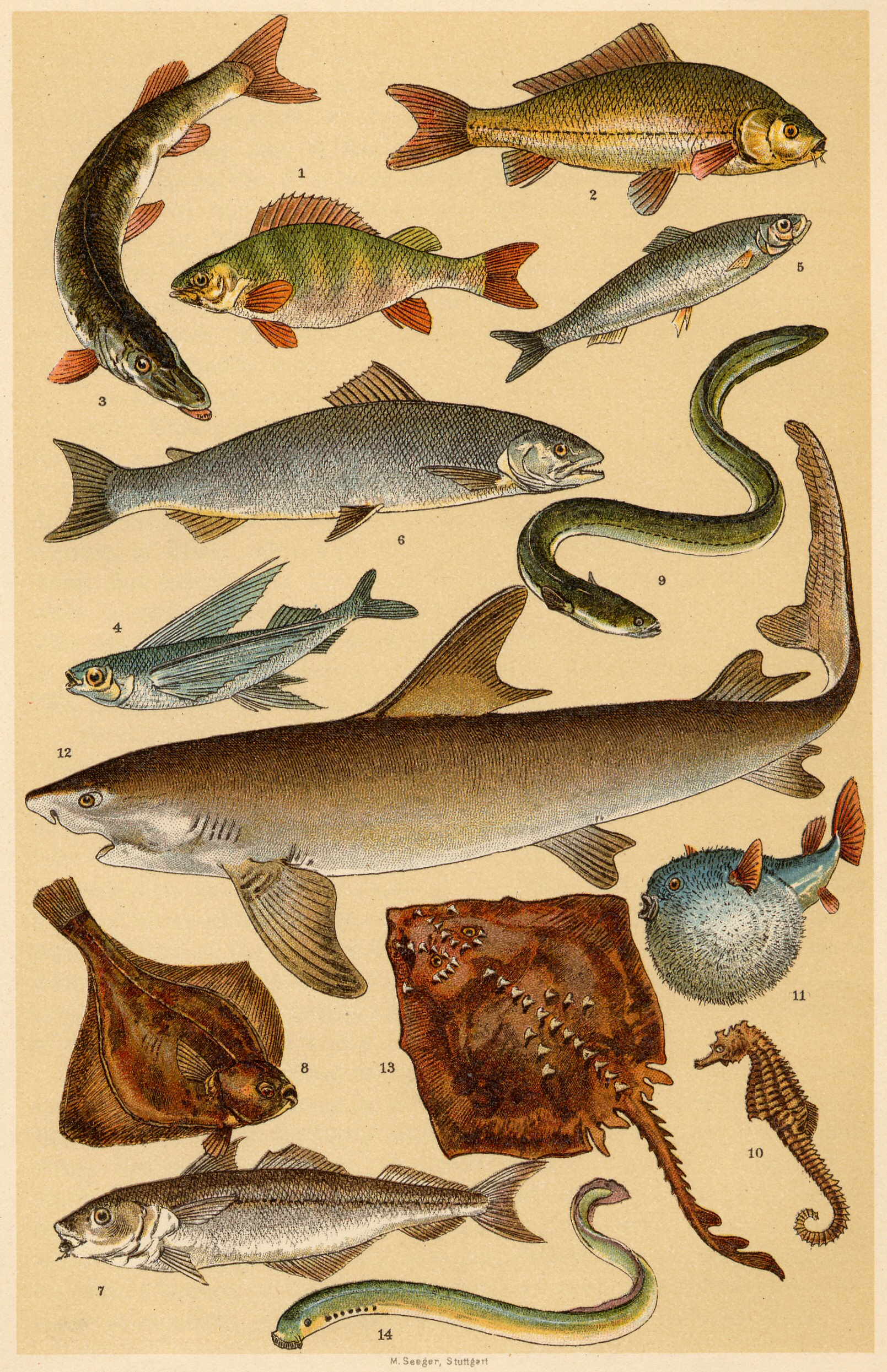
Fishes from Popular Natural History

- Robert Hunter, Henry Scherren, and John Williams. The Encyclopædic Dictionary. 7 volumes. Cassell. 1879–1888.
- Henry Scherren. Ponds and Rock Pools, with hints on collecting for and the management of the micro-aquarium. The Religious Tract Society. 1894.
- Henry Scherren. Popular History of Animals for Young People, with 13 coloured plates and numerous illustrations in the text. Cassell. 1895. (Republished as Popular Natural History, etc. 1906, 1913
- Henry Scherren. Through a Pocket Lens. The Religious Tract Society. 1897.
- Henry Scherren. Walks and Talks in the Zoo. The Religious Tract Society. 1900.
- Henry Scherren. A Short History of the Zoological Society of London. The Zoological Society. 1901.
- Henry Scherren. Popular Natural History of the Lower Animals (Invertebrates). The Religious Tract Society. 1903.
- Henry Scherren. The Zoological Society of London : a sketch of its foundation and development, and the story of its farm, museum, gardens, menagerie and library. Cassell, 1905.
- "Platypus" (in part). Encyclopædia Britannica, 1911.

== See also ==
- Cleaning symbiosis
- Congolese Spotted Lion
- Pumapard (quoting Scherren from The Field No. 2887, 25 April 1908)
