= Stephen Hislop =

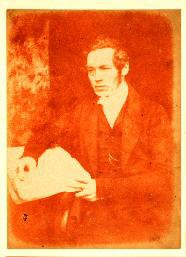
- Salted paper print (ca 1845)
- Born: 8 September 1817; Duns, Berwickshire, Scotland
- Died: 4 September 1863 (aged 45); Bori River, Takalghat, India
- Resting place: Nagpur, India
- Education: University of Glasgow, University of Edinburgh
- Occupations: Missionary; Geologist
- Employer: Free Church of Scotland
- Spouse: Erasma Hall
- Parent(s): Stephen Hislop, Margaret Thomson

Stephen Hislop (8 September 1817, in Duns, Scotland – 4 September 1863, in Takalghat) was a Scottish missionary who worked with the Free Church in India, an educationist and a keen geologist. Hislop College, Nagpur is named after him, as is the green mineral Hislopite. Among his geological discoveries is the fossil reptile, Brachyops laticeps which he found in his geological explorations of the Nagpur region.

== Early life ==
Hislop was born in Duns, Berwickshire on 8 September 1817, the youngest son of Stephen Hislop, a local builder, and his wife, Margaret Thomson. As a boy, he, like his older brother Robert, collected insects in the country around Duns, and rocks such as copper ore from old mine workings.

Hislop was educated at Thomas Sherriff's school in Duns. He matriculated from the University of Glasgow in 1838 and completed his MA degree at the University of Edinburgh. He then studied divinity at New College, Edinburgh 1843/44 studying to be a minister of the Free Church of Scotland but this was delayed by the Disruption of 1843.

== Later life ==
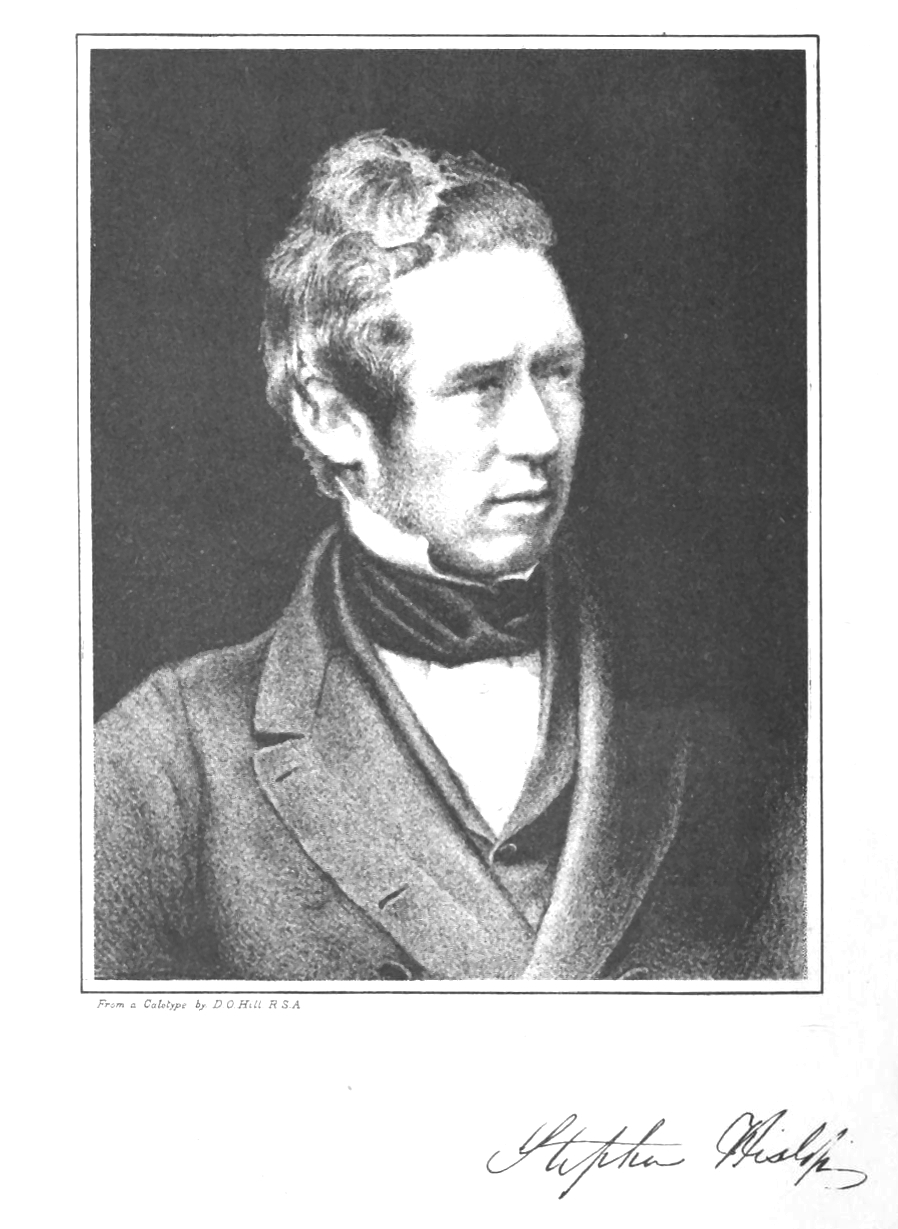
Calotype by David Octavius Hill

In 1843, Hislop was made Secretary of the Ladies' Society for Female Education in India. He volunteered the next year to the Foreign Missions Committee and married Erasma daughter of William Hull of Olney. In September 1844 an unusual ceremony (people were usually ordained in the church they were to represent), overseen by Rev Dr John Wilson of Bombay at St George's Free Church in Edinburgh, Hislop was ordained as a Free Church of Scotland minister of Nagpur in India, his primary role to be a missionary.

He arrived by ship at Bombay on 13 December 1844. He lived and worked in the Vidarbha area of Eastern Maharashtra near Nagpur for 18 years. He spent the first 15 months learning Marathi. As soon as he was fluent, he began his missionary work, opening a school in Nagpur in May 1846; it later developed into Hislop College. Hislop also learnt Gondi and preached among the Gond tribes.

From 1847 to 1855 he was assisted by Rev Robert Hunter who shared his love of geology, and they made many study trips together.

Hislop was returning from a visit to some ruins at Taklghat during the night of 4/5 September 1863, when his horse fell into the water in darkness in the Bori river and he was drowned. He was buried at the Sitabaldi cemetery.

=== Reception ===
Sir Richard Temple, who became chief commissioner of the central provinces in 1862, praised Hislop as "among the most gifted and accomplished missionaries whom this generation has seen in India"; as being notable "for philology and antiquarian research"; and "for physical science, especially botany and geology".

=== Geology and natural history ===
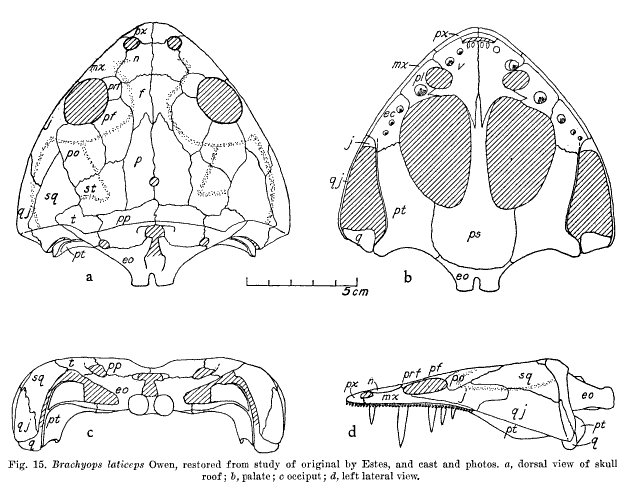
The Labyrinthodont reptile, Brachyops laticeps (Owen, 1854) was discovered by Hunter and Hislop in India.

Hislop was assisted by another Free Church of Scotland missionary, Robert Hunter (1823-1897), who later edited the Encyclopædic Dictionary. Both men were naturalists and keen amateur geologists, and as they walked the area around Nagpur, studied the local geology and sent papers home to be read at the Geological Society of London.

Joint papers with Hunter for the Geological Society included "On the Geology of the Neighbourhood of Nagpur, Central India"; "On the connection of the Umret Coal Beds with the Plant-beds of Nagpur, and of both with those of Burdwan".

Papers by Hislop (after Hunter became ill and returned to Britain) for the Geological Society included "Tertiary Deposits associated with Trap-Rock in the East Indies, and Fossil-shells from those deposits"; "On the Age of the fossiliferous thin-bedded Sandstone and Coal of Nagpur"; "Supplementary Note on the Plant-bearing Sandstone of Central India"; and "Fossil Teeth and Bones of Reptiles from Central India".

The finds by Hislop and Hunter included a new species of Labyrinthodont reptile, Brachyops laticeps that was described by Richard Owen in 1854.

Hislop wrote three papers for the Royal Asiatic Society's Journal: "Geology of the Nagpoor State"; "On the Age of the Coal Strata in Western Bengal and Central India"; and "Remarks on the Geology of Nagpoor".

The mineral Hislopite was named after Hislop by his friend the Rev. Prof. Haughton in 1858.

=== Activities ===
In 1857, Hislop's connections to local people were instrumental in saving the lives of the Europeans in Nagpur: one of his Muslim friends warned him of an impending attack during the "Indian mutiny"; among the rebellion's causes was the public auction of the jewels of Nagpur's royal family.

Hislop wrote several essays on different, mostly Dravidian, tribes of the Nagpur region. These essays were published posthumously by R. Temple in 1866. This work resulted in a mission for the Gondi people.

According to the entry on Hislop in the Dictionary of National Biography, he also worked on the geology of the Nagpur region and published his findings in three papers for the British Association in 1859.

== Family ==
Hislop's older brother Alexander Hislop (1807-1865), who wrote The Two Babylons, was also a minister of the Free Church of Scotland, representing East. Arbroath.

Hislop married Erasma Hull from Olney in July 1844 at St Cuthbert's Church, Edinburgh. His wife returned to Edinburgh after Stephen's death, living in the Morningside district. She died at 20 Viewforth Terrace on 27 June 1903. They had several children: Margaret Erasma Hislop (d.1927); Stephen Robert Hislop (1846-1908); Elizabeth Crichton Hislop (1848-1920); and Wilhelmina Maitland Hislop (1851-1924). The daughters lived together as spinsters at 20 Viewforth Terrace.

== Bibliography ==
- Smith, George. Stephen Hislop: Pioneer Missionary & Naturalist in Central India. John Murray, Albemarle Street. London, 1888. PDF
- Kingsford, Charles Lethbridge. "Hislop, Stephen" . Dictionary of National Biography. Vol. 27. pp. 12–13.
- Geological Society. "Obituary: Hislop, Rev Stephen". 1864. The Geological Society. Quarterly Journal 20.
- Free Church of Scotland (Continuing). Stephen Hislop, a Free Church Pioneer. The Explorer, November 2010. Pages 4–5.
