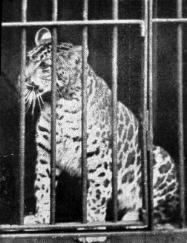
- A pumapard, 1904

Scientific classification
- Kingdom: Animalia
- Phylum: Chordata
- Class: Mammalia
- Order: Carnivora
- Superfamily: Feloidea
- Family: Felidae
- Hybrid: Puma concolor × Panthera pardus

= Pumapard =

Hybrid between a leopard and a cougar

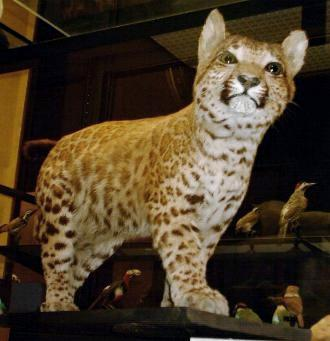
A pumapard, the Rothschild Museum, Tring, England (front view)

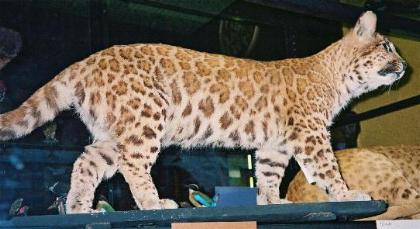
A pumapard, the Rothschild Museum, Tring, England (side view)

A pumapard is a hybrid of a cougar and a leopard. Both male cougar with female leopard and male leopard with female cougar pairings have produced offspring. In general, these hybrids have exhibited a tendency to dwarfism.

== Characteristics ==
Whether born to a male cougar mated to a leopardess, or to a male leopard mated to a female cougar, pumapards inherit a form of dwarfism. Those reported grew to only half the size of the parents. They have a long, cougar-like body (proportional to the limbs, but nevertheless shorter than either parent) with short legs. The coat is variously described as sandy, tawny, or grayish with brown, chestnut, or "faded" rosettes.

One is preserved in the Walter Rothschild Zoological Museum at Tring, England, and clearly shows the tendency to dwarfism. This hybrid was exhibited at the Tierpark in Stellingen (Hamburg), Germany. A black and white photograph of the Tring hybrid appeared in Animals of the World (1917) with the caption "This is a photograph from life of a very rare hybrid. That animal's father was a puma, its mother a leopard. It is now dead and it may be seen stuffed in Mr. Rothschild's Museum at Tring."

== History ==
In the late 1890s/early 1900s, two hybrids were born in Chicago, United States, followed two years later by three sets of twin cubs born at a zoo in Hamburg, Germany, from a cougar father and leopard mother. Carl Hagenbeck bred several litters of cougar × leopard hybrids in 1898 at the suggestion of a menagerie owner in Great Britain; this was possibly Lord Rothschild (as one of the hybrids is preserved in his museum) who may have heard of the two hybrid cubs bred in Chicago in 1896 and suggested that Hagenbeck reproduce the pairing.

Hagenbeck's cougar/leopard hybrids may have been inspired by a pair of leopard × cougar hybrid cubs born in Chicago on 24 April 1896 at Tattersall's indoor arena, where Ringling Brothers Circus opened its season:

Two tiny cubs which look like young leopards were born at Tattersall's where Ringling Brothers circus is housed, yesterday (24 APR [18]96). They are not leopards, however. Their mother is a mountain lion or cougar and their father is a leopard. They take after their father decidedly and are the daintiest little members of the cat family ever born in captivity. They are the only ones of their kind, so far as known, ever born, either within the confines of a cage or anywhere else. These black and yellow youngsters were on exhibition yesterday and were admired by all who saw them. They will probably be on view the rest of the time the circus exhibits in Chicago.

Helmut Hemmer reported a similar hybrid. These hybrids had cougar-like long tails and sandy or tawny coats with chestnut leopard-like markings and cougar-like cheek markings. Another was described as resembling a little gray puma with large brown rosettes.

Henry Scherren wrote:

There was, and probably is now, in the Berlin Garden and Indian leopard and puma male hybrid, purchased by Carl Hagenbeck in 1898.

In his Guide, Dr. Heck described it as "a little grey puma with large brown rosettes". Another hybrid between the same species, but with a puma for sire and a leopard for dam, was recently at Stellingen; it resembled the female parent in form as may be seen from the reproduction from a photograph taken there.

According to Carl Hagenbeck (1951), a male cougar and female leopard produced a hybrid male cub that was reared by a female Fox Terrier at Hagenbeck Tierpark, Hamburg (fostering being normal practice at this time). This male hybrid was intermediate between the cougar and leopard in color and pattern, having faint leopard spots on a cougar-colored background. The body length was much less than either parent, while the tail was long, like the cougar. Hagenbeck bred these hybrids at the suggestion of an unidentified menagerie owner; however, the hybrids were considered dull and uninteresting. Modern geneticists find them more interesting because the leopard and the cougar were not considered to be closely related enough to produce offspring.

H. Petzsch (1956) mentioned that puma/leopard hybrids had been obtained by artificial insemination. H. Hemmer (1966) reported the hybrid between a male Indian leopard (P. p. fusca) and a female puma as being fairly small, with a ground color like that of the puma and having rather faded rosettes.

The hybrids were additionally reported by C. J. Cornish et al. (undated), R. Rörig (1903), T. Haltenorth (1936), and O. Antonius (1951).

== See also ==
- Felid hybrids—Small cat hybrids
- Panthera hybrids—Hybrids between lions, tigers, leopards and jaguars
