= Robert Hunter (encyclopædist) =

Scottish encyclopædist (1823–1897)

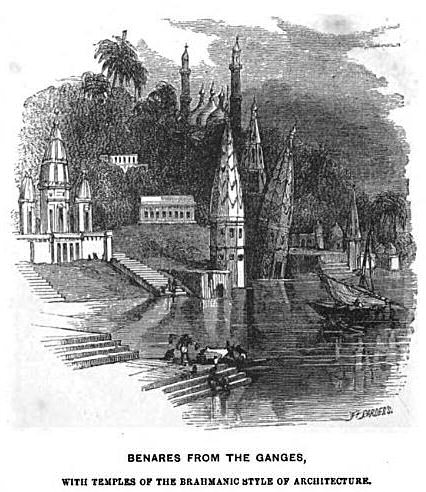
- Engraved illustration Benares from the Ganges in Hunter's 1863 History of India
- Born: 3 September 1823; Newburgh, Fife, Scotland
- Died: 25 February 1897 (aged 73); Loughton, Essex, England
- Education: The Grammar School, Aberdeen; Marischal College, University of Aberdeen
- Occupations: Missionary; Encyclopædist
- Employer: Free Church of Scotland
- Parent(s): John Mackenzie Hunter, Agnes Strickland

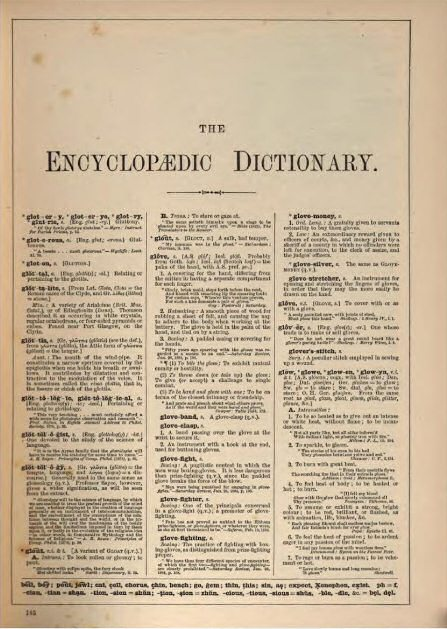
First page of text of Volume IV of The Encyclopaedic Dictionary

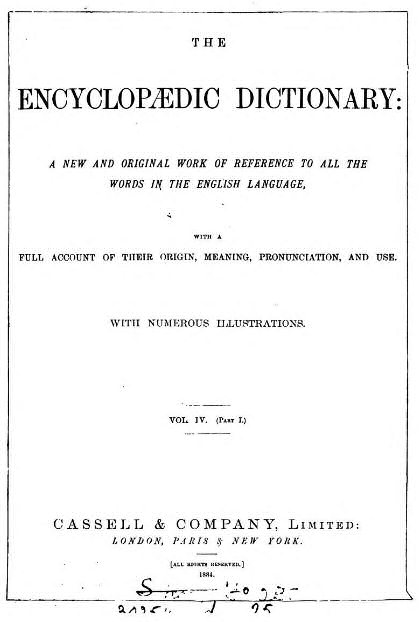
Title Page: A New and Original Work of Reference to all the Words in the English Language, with a Full Account of Their Origin, Meaning, Pronunciation, and Use. With Numerous Illustrations

Robert Hunter (3 September 1823 – 25 February 1897) was the lead editor of the Encyclopædic Dictionary, which he produced in seven volumes between 1879 and 1888. In addition, he was an ordained minister and missionary for the Free Church of Scotland, and a notable geologist, becoming a Fellow of the Geological Society.

== Life ==
Hunter was born in Newburgh, Fife in 1823 to John Mackenzie Hunter of Portpatrick, Wigtownshire, an excise officer, and Agnes Strickland of Ulverston, Lancashire. The family moved to 5 Littlejohn Street in Aberdeen while Robert was still young.

He was educated at Aberdeen Grammar School where he came first in the open exam for university bursaries and thus went to Marischal College at the University of Aberdeen. He studied Latin, Greek, Mathematics and Natural Science, frequently coming first in the exams. Around 1843 he studied Divinity for at least one year at New College, Edinburgh.

His first job was as a tutor in the Bermudas, spending his free time collecting corals; in 1845 he brought home the finest preserved specimens of brain coral that professor Sir Richard Owen had ever seen.

As a probationer Hunter taught at the Sunday School in the West Free Church in Coatbridge. He left in November 1846, having been ordained as a minister in the Free Church of Scotland to work as a missionary in Nagpur in India, as an assistant to Rev Stephen Hislop. He arrived in Nagpur early in 1847. Both men were keen geologists, and on their missionary travels they both recorded the local geology and fossils. Both of them wrote a number of geological papers, which were read in their absence at the Geological Society of London.

In 1855 Hunter was forced by ill health to return to Britain. He wrote several articles for the British and Foreign Evangelical Review. In 1863 he published his History of India. Among his other activities, he ran services for the Presbyterian Church of England at Sewardstone, and was children's minister of the church at the Victoria Docks which was built for him by the sugar magnate, James Duncan. In England, he was a member, though never a beneficed minister, of the Presbyterian Church of England.

In 1882 Hunter built a house, Forest Retreat (now Forest Villa) on Staples Road, in the hilly part of Loughton, Essex later called by some Little Cornwall. The house had views over Epping Forest and the Roding Valley. On 23 February 1997, for the centenary of Hunter's death, Loughton Town Council placed a blue plaque on the house with the inscription "The Rev. Robert Hunter (1823-1897) Lexicographer and Naturalist lived here".

He died at the house in 1897. He is buried in the City of London Cemetery.

== The Encyclopædic Dictionary ==
Hunter's best-known work is his Encyclopædic Dictionary. This was the largest such dictionary in English, or indeed any language, at the time. Its page design is "a remarkable precursor of Murray's OED layout: bold lowercase is used for headwords, senses are divided using a 'branching' numbering system, and each sense within the hierarchy begins a new paragraph."

Hunter's "colossal work" on the dictionary took up seventeen years of his life: seven years on his own, and then ten years working with the team of Henry Scherren and John Williams at Forest Retreat, Hunter's house in Loughton, Essex. His interest in lexicography remained unsated as he went on to edit Cassell's 764 page Bible Dictionary.

== Honours and distinctions ==
In 1868 Hunter became a Fellow of the Geological Society (FGS). In 1883 he was awarded an honorary LL.D. degree by Aberdeen University.

== Family ==
Hunter's older brother John, born in Newburgh in 1821, worked as a journalist in Canada and founded the first building society in Halifax; his family finally moved to Canada in 1857, and he changed his name to Hunter-Duvar in 1861.

== Bibliography ==
- Robert Hunter. The History of India; From the Earliest Ages to the Fall of the East India Company and the Proclamation of Queen Victoria in 1858. T. Nelson and sons, 1863.
- Robert Hunter, Henry Scherren, and John Williams. The Encyclopædic Dictionary. 7 volumes [in 14]. Cassell & Company. London, Paris & New York. 1879–1888. Full text
- Robert Hunter. Cassell's concise Bible Dictionary or illustrated Bible Manual. Cassell & Company. 1893. Originally published as The Sunday School Teacher's Bible Manual.
- Robert Hunter. History of the missions of the Free church of Scotland in India and Africa. T. Nelson and sons, 1873.
- Robert Hunter, William Hume Elliot, Christopher Charles Pond. The Life of Robert Hunter (1823-1897): Lexicographer Missionary, Geologist & Naturalist in Aberdeen, Nagpore, Victoria Docks, Sewardstone & Loughton. Loughton & District Historical Society, 1997.
