= Rabbit show jumping =

Animal sport

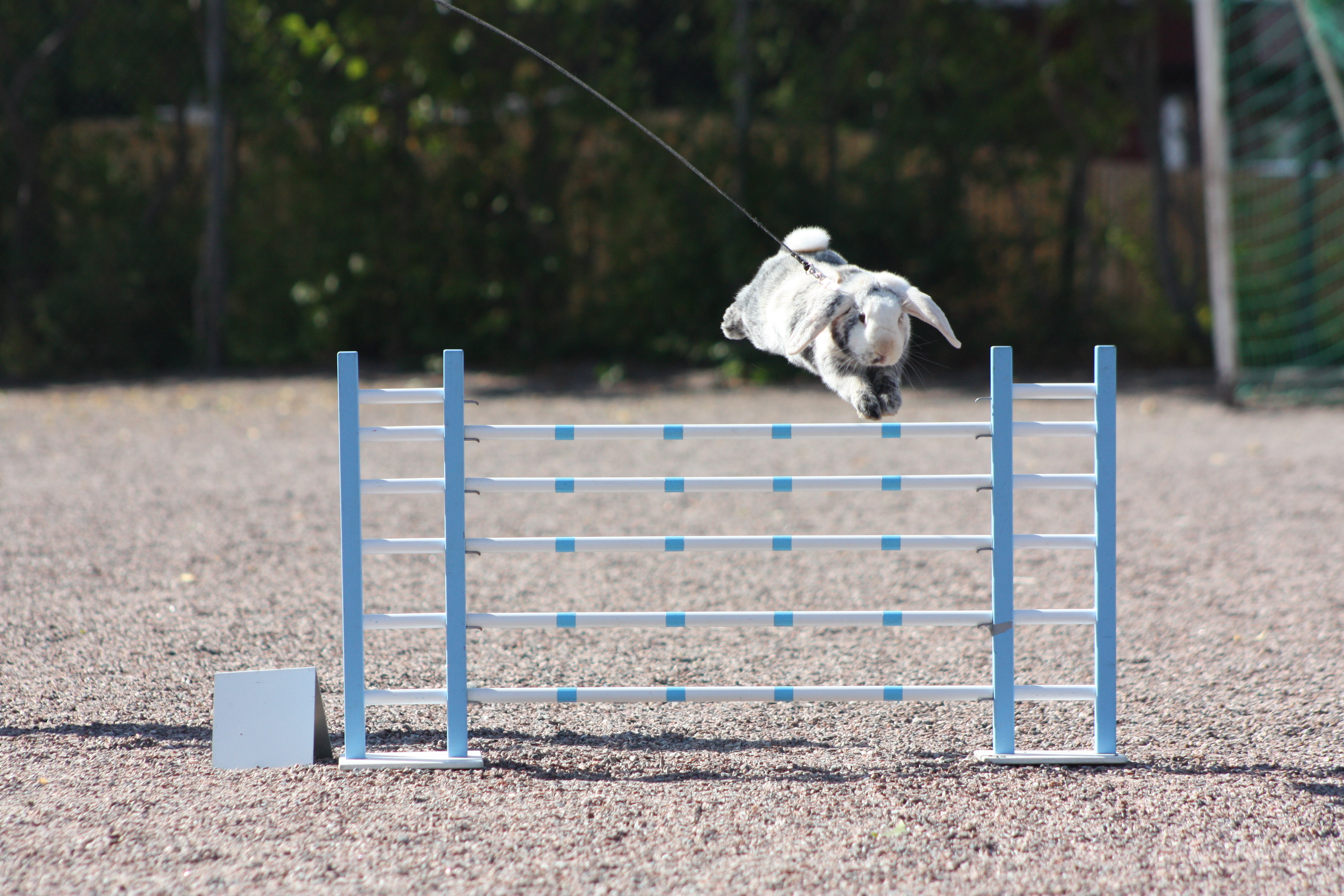
- Nicknames: Rabbit hopping, rabbit agility
- First played: 1970s, Sweden

Characteristics
- Contact: No
- Type: Outdoor
- Equipment: Hurdles

Presence
- Country or region: Worldwide
- Olympic: No

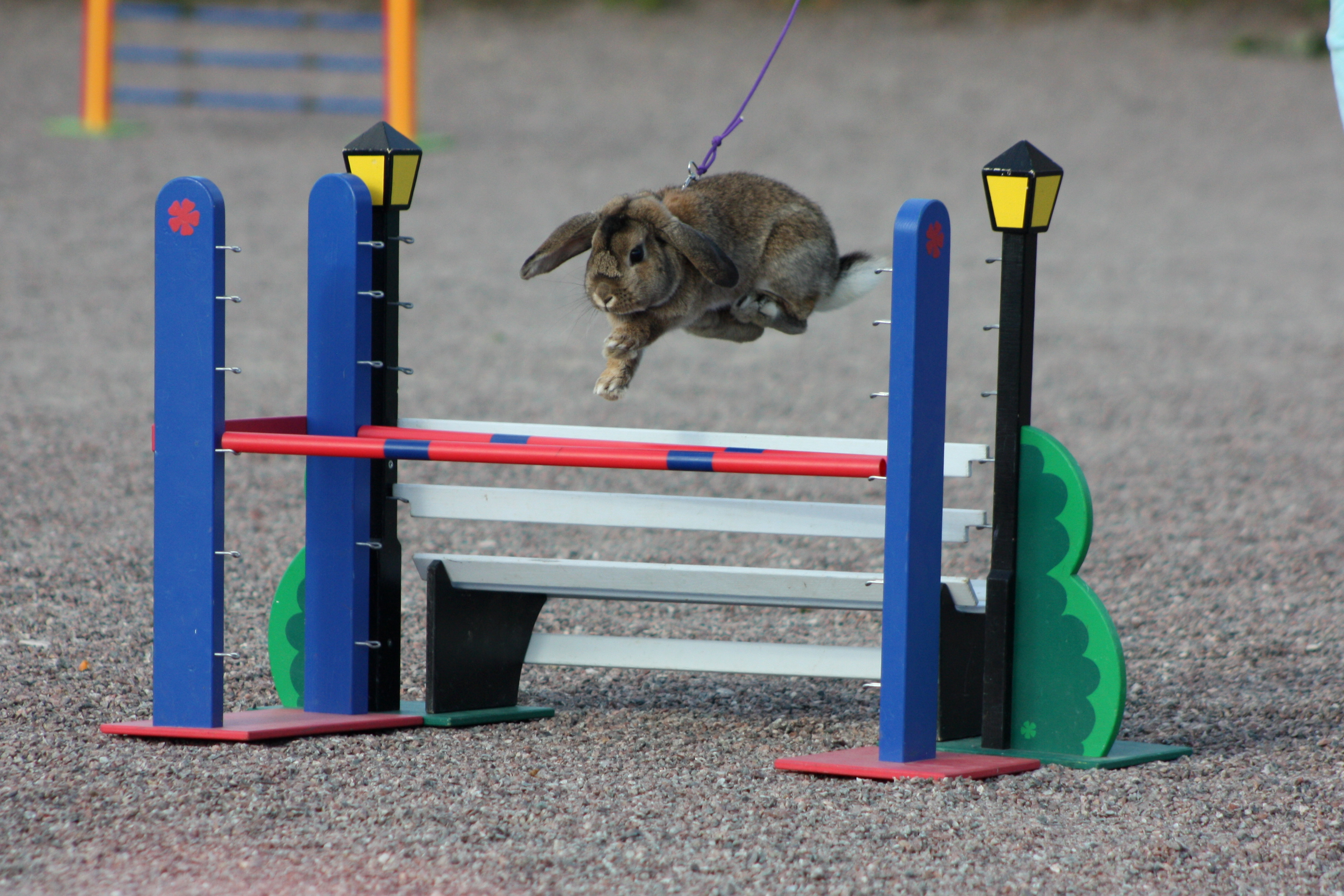
Rabbit jumping over a fence at a Rabbit Show Jumping Competition

Rabbit show jumping (Swedish: Kaninhoppning), also known as rabbit agility or rabbit hopping, is an animal sport wherein domestic rabbits are led through a course by their owners, modelled after horse show jumping. It is typically conducted in a closed, indoor arena, with obstacles scaled to suit the rabbits. Competitions have been held in the United States and several European countries. As rabbits are common domestic pets, some owners train their pet rabbits for this sport.

== History ==
Rabbit jumping started in Sweden in the 1970s, when the first rabbit club started to arrange rabbit jumping competitions.

At that time, the rules were based on the rules from horse jumping, but were later reformed to be better-suited for rabbits. The sport grew throughout Sweden and several rabbit jumping clubs were formed to support the growing interest. In the early 1990s, Norway joined in with rabbit jumping activities, developing new clubs and joining Sweden in rabbit jumping competitions. The Sveriges Kaninhoppares Riksförbund (Swedish Federation of Rabbit Jumping) was established on September 3, 1994. Rabbit show jumping became popular in all parts of Sweden.

The sport reached the United States in the 1980s. The Rabbit Hopping Organization of America (RHOA) was founded in 2001. The rules and guidelines for rabbit hopping were established for the club with the help of the judges' committee in Denmark and with personal assistance from judge Aase Bjerner.

The American Hopping Association for Rabbits and Cavies (AHARC) was chartered with the American Rabbit Breeders Association in 2013. The rules and guidelines for this association were moulded after RHOA and Denmark clubs. The AHARC held the very first official national competition in the United States during the 2011 ARBA Convention in Indianapolis, IN. The performance competition for rabbits during the 2013 ARBA convention in Harrisburg, PA was a Mid Atlantic Rabbit and Cavy event. AHARC had the first national performance event for cavies during the 2014 ARBA TX convention. A rabbit hopping competition was held during the 2017 North Carolina State Fair. The Rabbit Hopping Society of Australia was founded in 2013, also with the assistance of Aase and Rasmus Bjerner.

In 2015 Freya Pocock Johansson founded Rabbit Hopping New Zealand.

== Record jumps ==
The world record for the highest rabbit jump is 107 cm (42.1 in), and was achieved in March 2023 by Holloway GtCh Tennessine, owned by Marie Kozubková from Czech Republic. As of June 2019, Miss Pinky's Grand Champion Harajuku "Dobby", owned by Julia Samson from Sweden, holds the world record for longest jump, at 301 cm (9.88 ft), achieved in August 2017.

== Courses ==
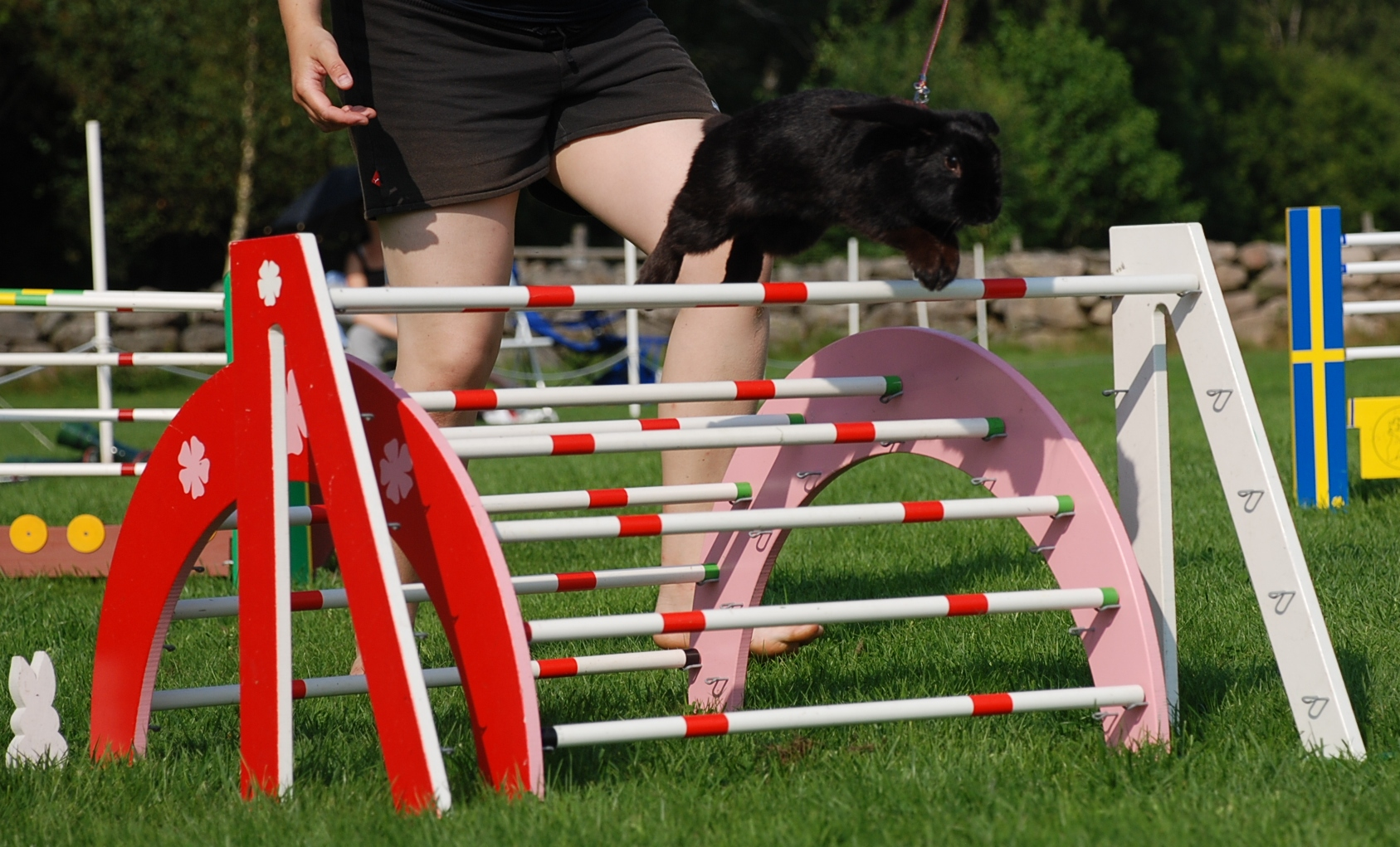

Official rabbit hopping competitions consist of a straight course, a crooked course, high jump, and long jump. In a straight course, all the obstacles are placed in a straight line and have to be jumped in succession. In a crooked course, the obstacles are placed in an interloping path in which the obstacles must be jumped in the correct order.

Straight and crooked courses are divided into 5 levels. The measurements are slightly different in different countries.

- Mini: Max 26 cm (10 in) high, 30 cm (12 in) long (6-8 obstacles)
- Easy: Max 30 cm (12 in) high, 45 cm (18 in) long (8 obstacles)
- Medium: Max 38 cm (15 in) high, 65 cm (26 in) long (10 obstacles)
- Advanced: Max 45 cm (18 in) high, 75 cm (30 in) long (10 obstacles)
- Elite: Max 50 cm (20 in) high, 80 cm (31 in) long (12 obstacles)

The mini-course is an introductory course. In order to progress from easy to medium, etc. a rabbit has to earn promotion points. Rabbits are placed according to the number of faults they have (such as knocking a rail down). Time only comes into play if 2 placing rabbits have tied for the same placing.

A rabbit has a set time (usually 60 minutes) to complete the course. If the time runs out before the course is completed, the rabbit is disqualified.

== Breeds ==
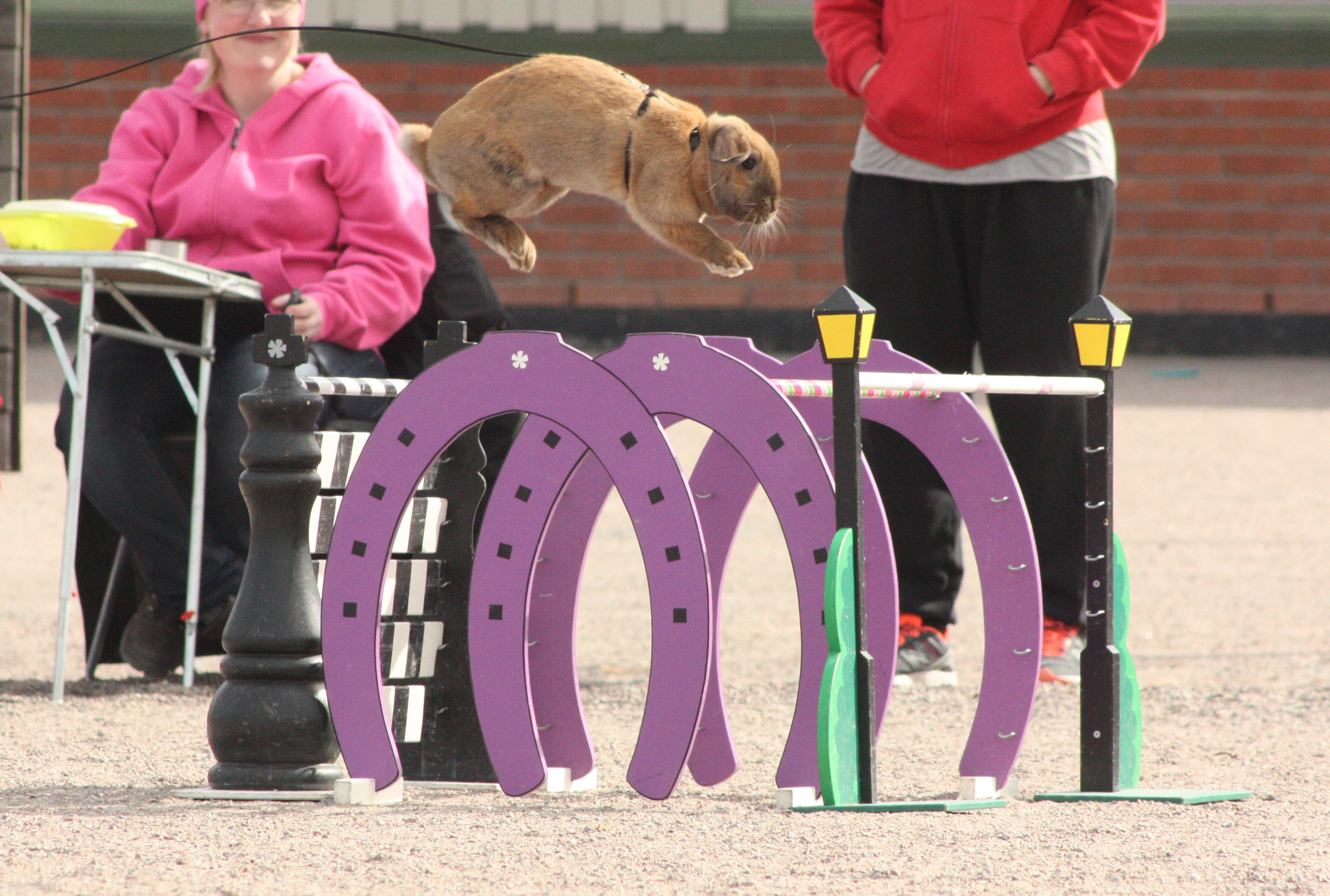
Rabbit jumping over an obstacle at Rabbit Show Jumping

All breeds are allowed to compete; however, there may be problems with smaller and larger breeds. Dwarf rabbits are smaller than 2 kilograms (4.4 lb) and giants bigger than 5 kilograms (11 lb).

The ideal jumping rabbit has long legs and a medium-long back, which will help it correctly judge the height and length of obstacles. In the case of slender bone structures, such as the Belgian Hare, the legs should be strong and muscular so high jumps will not hurt them. In Scandinavia, where rabbit show jumping has a strong base, most are crossbreeds, bred with good jumpers as parents, similar to the method of breeding lurchers, deliberately crossbred racing dogs. Scandinavian Jumping Rabbits can be regarded as their own breed, with well-kept pedigrees.

== See also ==
- Rabbit show
- Rat agility
- Dog agility
- Cat agility
- Behavioral enrichment
