= Rat agility =

Sport for rats

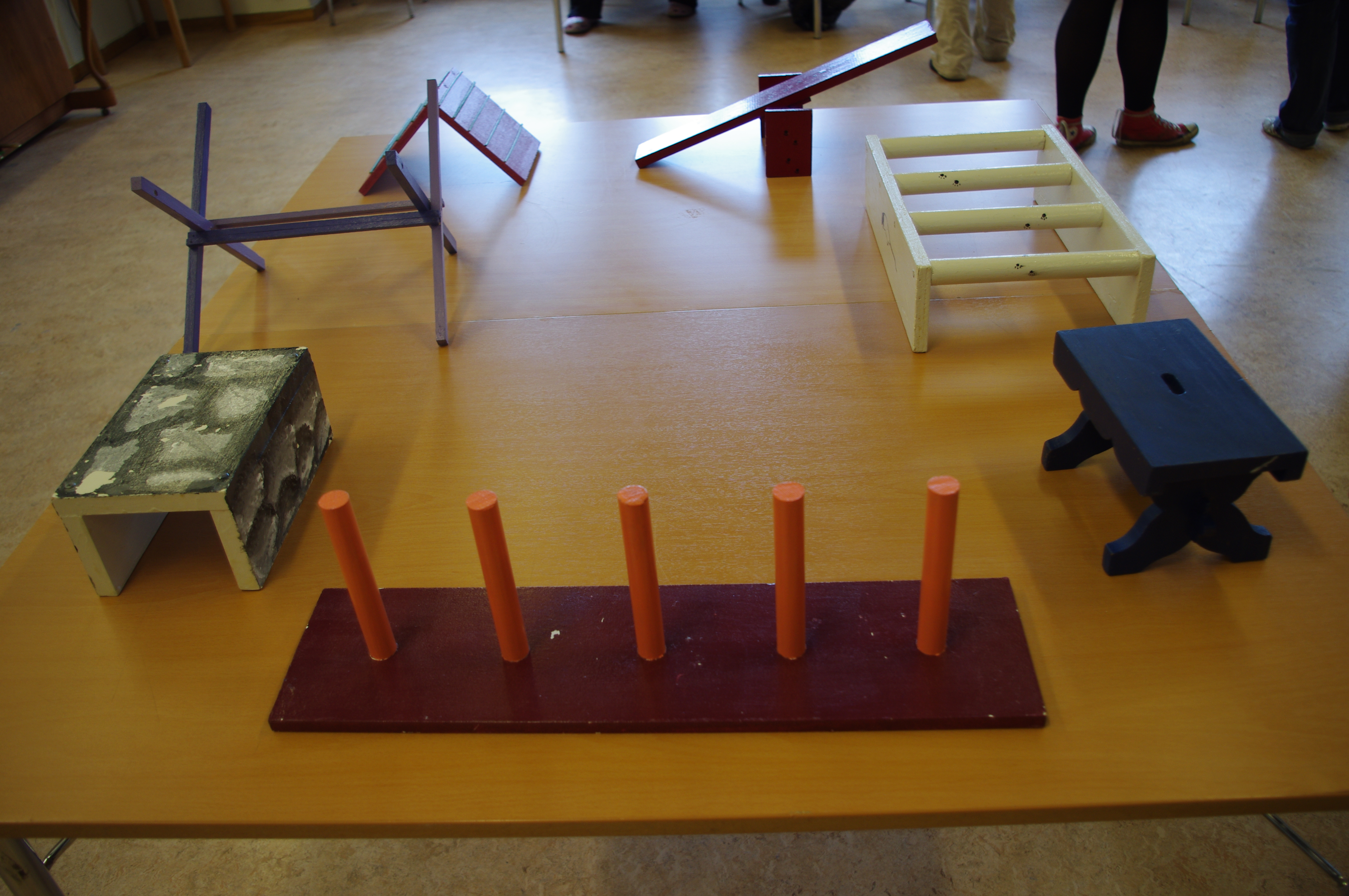
Some common obstacles.

Rat agility is a sport for pet rats using scaled-down versions of the obstacles used for dog agility events. The sport originated in Sweden and can trace its origin back to table runs in the 1980s, where the owner on one side of the table had to get the rat from the other side to move across the table in the shortest time possible. Rat agility became an official competition in 2000.

== Classes ==
Rat agility is performed in two classes. Class A is for beginners (either the rat or the driver or both) and is divided in two parts, an obstacle track and summoning. Class B is for the more experienced pair. It consists of a more difficult obstacle course and instead of summoning, the rat has to perform a trick.

== Jumping course ==
One of the typical obstacles typically encountered on a course is the jumping fence, a vertical barrier the rat crawls over (it rarely jumps over them despite the name). The A-fence or ramp is a simple up and down obstacle. The slalom fence or weaving poles consists of a series of vertical sticks that the rat must navigate through. A balance fence is a narrow strip or some kind of suspended walkway. Rats dislike floors that move, so they must trust the driver to be able to pass it. Another common obstacle is the tunnel, which the rat must navigate through without stopping. The seesaw obstacle also plays on the trust in the driver, as the rat must reach the other side without losing its nerve or running back when the seesaw flips over. The up-and-down-fence is similar to the slalom fence, but vertical instead of horizontal. The rat is required to go up and down over and under the sticks.

In addition to the standard array listed above, other versions of the obstacle course also exist.

== Guidance ==
In the sport it is the communication between the rat and the owner that is important, as the driver is not permitted to touch the rat, and must to rely on visual and auditory signals. Rats are suitable for agility due to their love of challenges and for the competition's ability to improve the animal's bond with its driver.

== See also ==
- Cat agility
- Rabbit show jumping also known as rabbit agility
