= Flemish Giant rabbit =

Belgian breed of rabbit

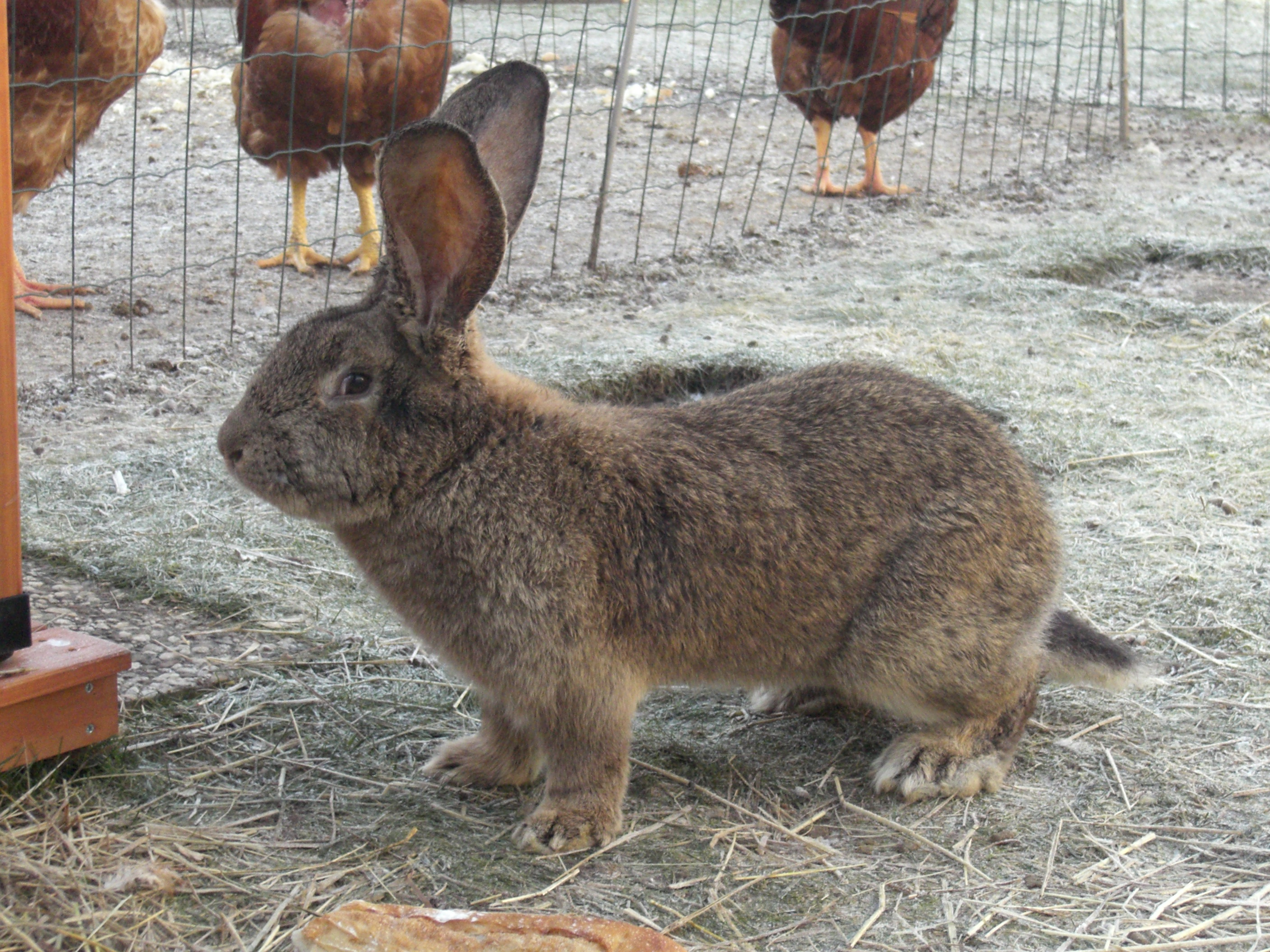
A Flemish Giant in an outdoor pen

The Flemish Giant (Dutch: Vlaamse reus) is the largest breed of domestic rabbit (Oryctolagus cuniculus domesticus). Originating in Flanders and being bred potentially as early as the 16th century, the first authentic records of the breed are known from roughly 1860. Breed standards for the Flemish Giant were first written in 1893, and it is the ancestor of the Belgian Hare and Continental Giant rabbit breeds. Flemish Giants were imported to America in efforts to breed larger rabbits for meat. It became fairly popular at rabbit shows due to its large size and varying colors, and has been promoted by the National Federation of Flemish Giant Rabbit Breeders since the club's formation in 1915.

Flemish Giant rabbits are typically docile pets and are often raised for their meat. They are often used by 4-H programs to teach children about responsibility due to their personalities and less complicated grooming needs. One individual named Alex the Great was adopted and raised as a therapy animal.

== History ==
The Flemish Giant originated in Flanders. It was bred as early as the 16th century near the city of Ghent, Belgium. It is believed to have descended from a number of meat and fur breeds, possibly including the Steenkonijn ("Stone Rabbit"—referring to the old Belgian weight size of one stone or about 3.8 kilograms (8.4 lb)) and the European "Patagonian" breed (now extinct). This "Patagonian" rabbit, a large breed that was once bred in Belgium and France, was not the same as the Patagonian rabbit of Argentina (Sylvilagus brasiliensis), a wild species of a different genus weighing less than 0.9 kilograms (2.0 lb), nor the Patagonian mara (Dolichotis patagonum), sometimes called the Patagonian hare, a species in the cavy family of rodents that cannot interbreed with rabbits. Thomas Coatoam, in his Origins of the Flemish Giants, states that "The earliest authentic record of the Flemish Giant Rabbit occurred about the year 1860, in which the veterinarian and ex-biologist, Oscar Nisbett selectively bred a series of generations of Patagonian rabbit."

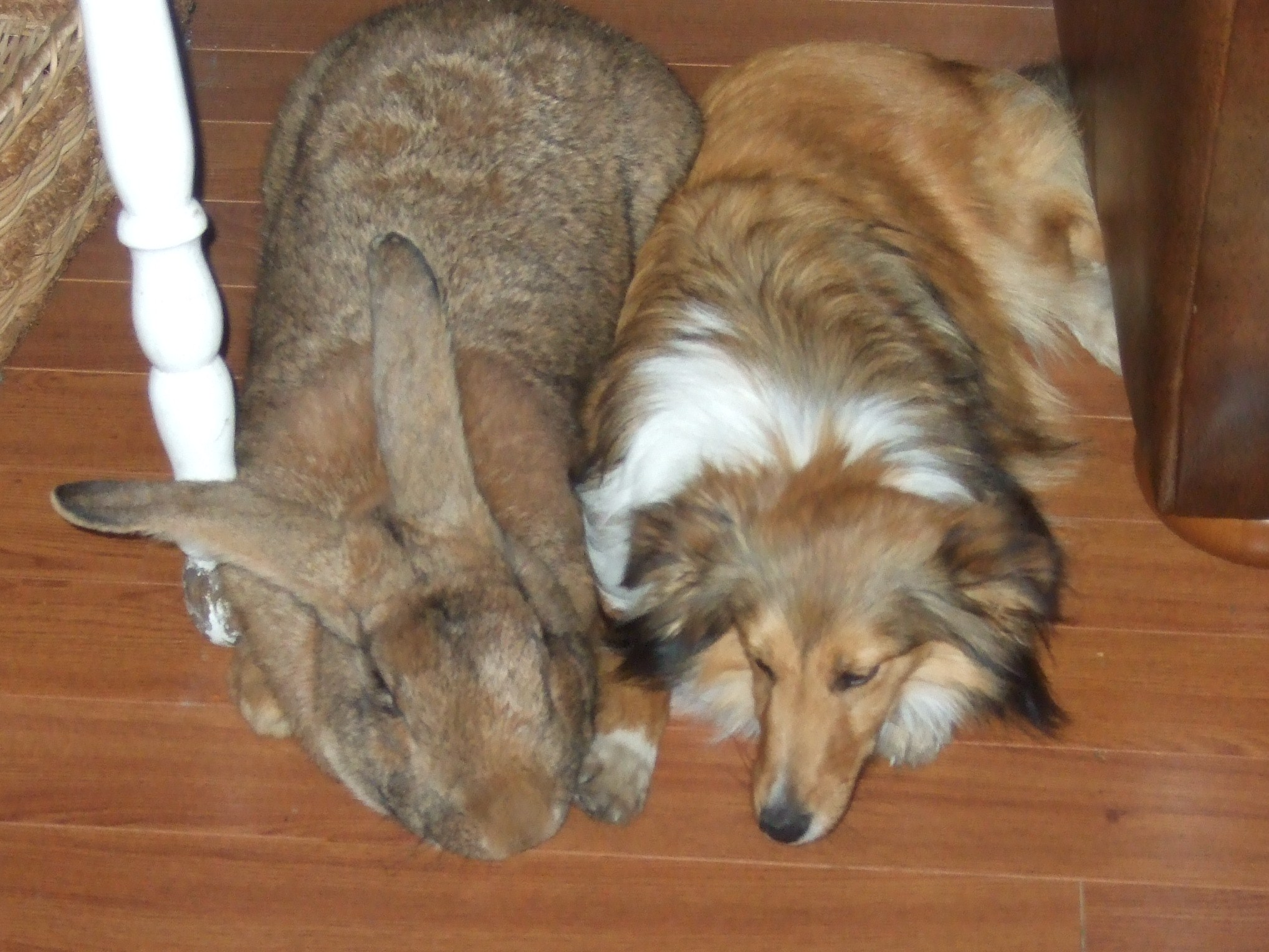
A male next to a Shetland Sheepdog

The first standards for the breed were written in 1893 by Albert van Heuverzwijn. The Flemish Giant is an ancestor of many rabbit breeds from all over the world, one of which is the Belgian Hare, which was imported into England in the mid-19th century. The Flemish Giant was exported from England and Belgium to America in the early 1890s to increase the size of meat rabbits during the great "rabbit boom". In the British Isles, the breed developed to such a degree that it was recognized as distinct from the Continental Giant rabbit as of 1937. The Spanish giant rabbit is a descendant breed of the Flemish giant rabbit.

The breed received little attention in the United States until about 1910, when it started appearing at small livestock shows throughout the country. Today, it is one of the more popular breeds at rabbit shows due to its unusually large size and varying colors. It is promoted by the National Federation of Flemish Giant Rabbit Breeders, which was formed in 1915. The Flemish Giant has many nicknames, including the "Gentle Giant" for its uniquely docile personality, and the "universal rabbit" for its varied purposes as a pet, show, breeding, meat, and fur animal.

== Appearance ==
A sandy doe with a boy

The American Rabbit Breeders Association standard recognizes seven different colors for the breed: black, blue, fawn, sandy, light gray, steel gray, and white.

== Behaviour and lifestyle ==
Flemish Giants can be docile and tolerant of being handled if they frequently have interactions with humans. Alex the Great, a notable Flemish Giant, was selected for adoption because of his docile nature and was trained to be a therapy animal.

=== 4-H and show ===
Flemish Giants, due to their uncomplicated grooming requirements and docile personalities, are used by 4-H programs throughout the United States as a starter rabbit for teaching children responsibility and care of farm animals and pets. Another youth program outside 4-H that promotes responsible show breeding is run by the National Federation of Flemish Giant Breeders Youth Program. Flemish Giants are the second-oldest domesticated rabbit breed in the United States, following behind the now rare Belgian Hare.

== See also ==
- Domestic rabbit
  - List of rabbit breeds
    - French Lop
    - British Giant rabbit
    - Angora rabbit
- Alex the Great (rabbit)
- Teletubbies#Supporting_characters
