= Dog agility =

Dog sport

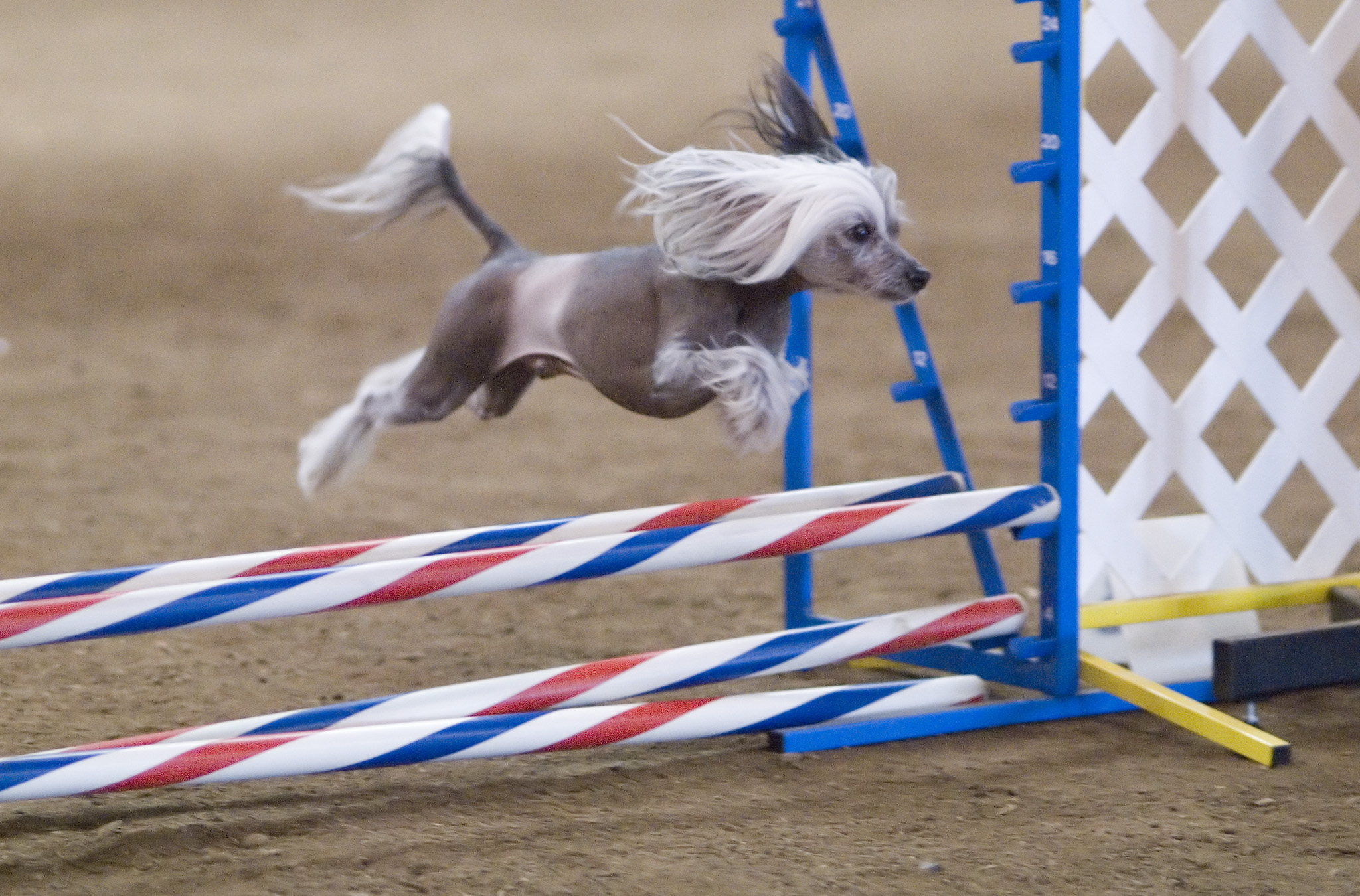
A hairless Chinese Crested taking part in an agility competition

A Border Collie competing in agility at the 2019 Westminster Kennel Club Dog Show

Dog agility is a dog sport in which a handler directs a dog through an obstacle course in a race for both time and accuracy. Dogs run off leash with no food or toys as incentives, and the handler can touch neither dog nor obstacles. Communication is limited to voice commands, movement, and body signals, which demands a high level of training for the dog and precise coordination from the handler.

An agility course is made up of a series of standardized obstacles arranged by a judge within a designated area of a specific size. The surface may be of grass, dirt, rubber, or special matting. Depending on the type of competition, the obstacles may be marked with numbers indicating the order in which they must be completed.

Courses are complicated enough that a dog could not complete them correctly without human direction. In competition, the handler must assess the course, decide on handling strategies, and direct the dog through the course, with precision and speed equally important. Many strategies exist to compensate for the inherent difference in human and dog speeds and the strengths and weaknesses of the various dogs and handlers.

== Competition basics ==
As each course is different, handlers are allowed a short walk-through (typically 8 minutes) before the competition starts. During this time, all handlers competing in a particular class can walk around the course without their dogs, determining how they can best position themselves and guide their dogs to get the most accurate and rapid path around the numbered obstacles. The handler tends to run a path much different from the dog's path, so the handler can sometimes spend quite a bit of time planning for what is usually a quick run.

The walk-through is critical for success because the course's path takes various turns, even U-turns or 270° turns, can cross back on itself, can use the same obstacle more than once, can have two obstacles so close to each other that the dog and handler must be able to clearly discriminate which to take, and can be arranged so that the handler must work with obstacles between themself and the dog, called layering, or at a great distance from the dog.

Printed maps of the agility course, called course maps, are occasionally made available to the handlers before they run, to help the handlers plan their course strategy. The course map contains icons indicating the position and orientation of all the obstacles, and numbers indicating the order in which the obstacles are to be taken. Course maps were originally drawn by hand, but nowadays courses are created using various computer programs.

Each dog and handler team gets one opportunity together to attempt to complete the course successfully. The dog begins behind a starting line and, when instructed by their handler, proceeds around the course. The handler typically runs near the dog, directing the dog with spoken commands and with body language (the position of arms, shoulders, and feet).

Because speed counts as much as accuracy, especially at higher levels of competition, this all takes place at a full-out run on the dog's part and, in places, on the handler's part as well.

Scoring of runs is based on how many faults are incurred. Penalties can include not only course faults, such as knocking down a bar in a jump, but also time faults, which are the number of seconds over the calculated standard course time, which in turn is determined based on the competition level, the complexity of the course, and other factors.

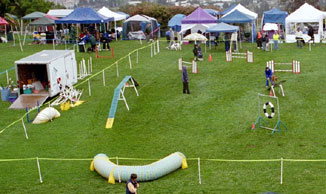
Agility field left side: A competition agility field showing (clockwise from lower left) a tunnel, the dogwalk, the judge standing in front of a winged jump, two additional winged jumps, dog executing the teeter-totter with his handler guiding, and the tire jump.

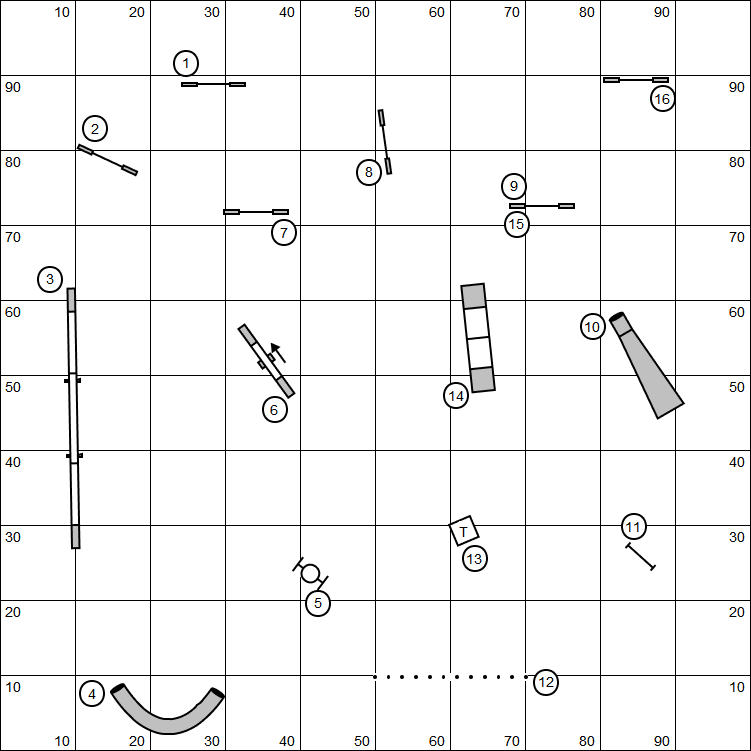
Course map showing the layout of the course in the preceding photos. Maps like this are commonly used by officials to communicate the course to handlers.

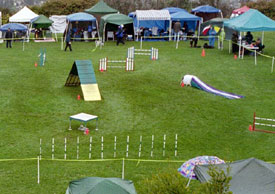
Agility field right side: The right side of the same agility field showing (clockwise from foreground) the weave poles, the pause table, the A-frame, two winged jumps, the collapsed tunnel (or chute), and a wingless jump. Numbered orange plastic cones next to obstacles indicate the order in which the dog must perform them.

== Agility obstacles ==
The regulations of different organizations specify somewhat different rules and dimensions for the construction of obstacles. However, the basic form of most obstacles is the same wherever they are used. Obstacles include the following:

=== Contact obstacles ===
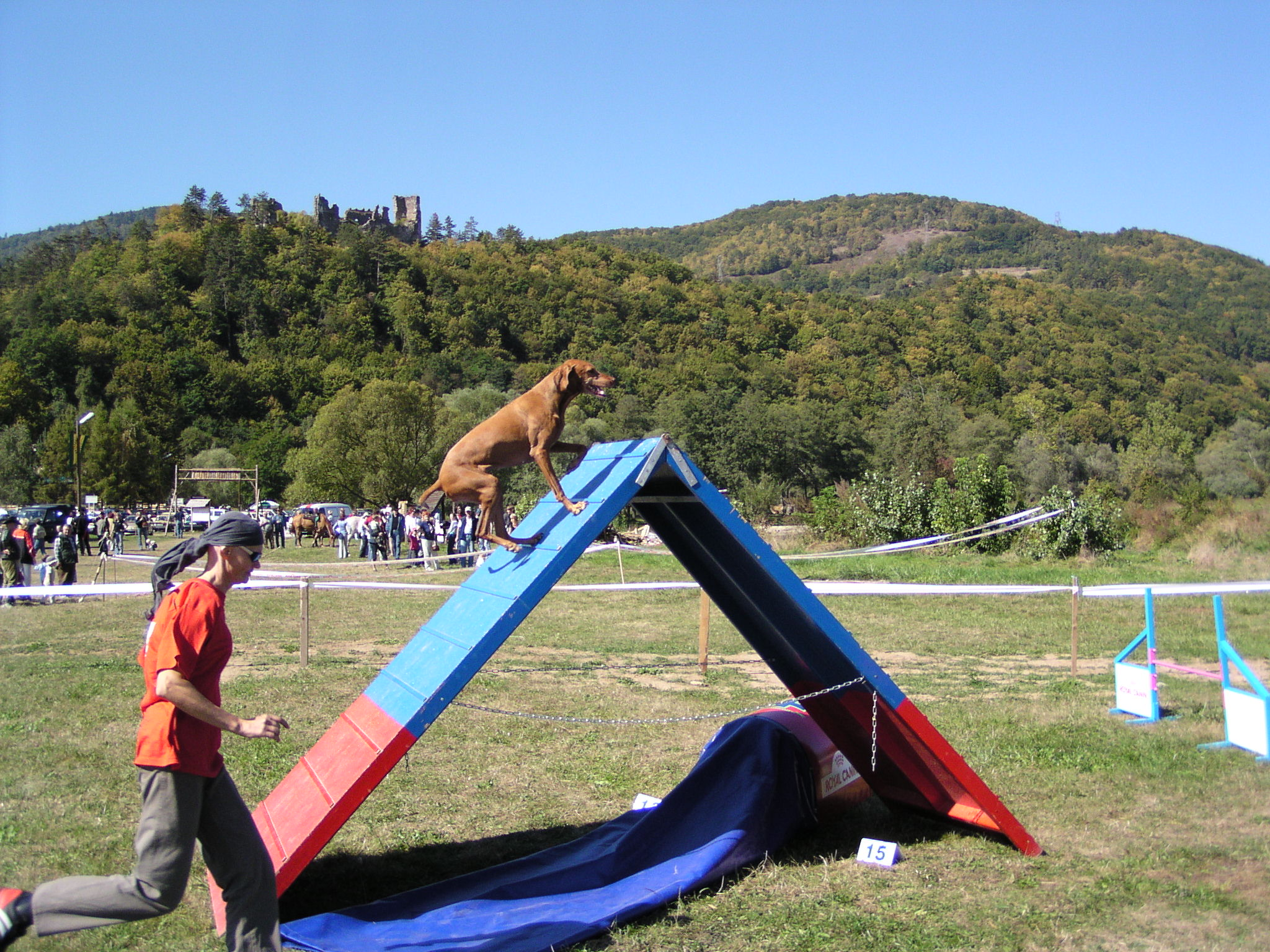
A-frame obstacle

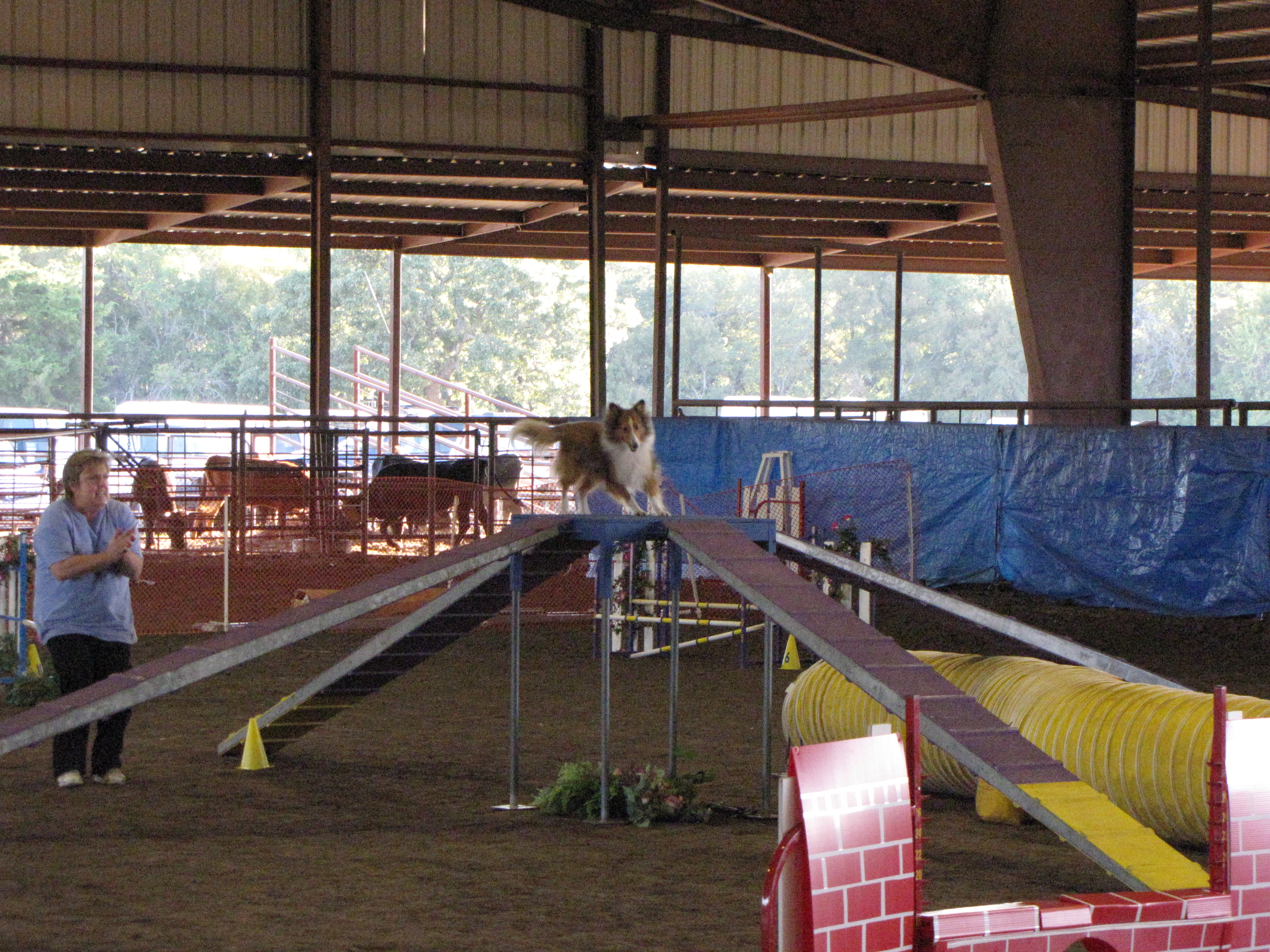

Contact obstacles are obstacles made of planks and ramps, they require dogs to ascend and descend the obstacle and to place a paw on a "contact zone", an area that is painted a different colour. The height, width and angle of the planks and ramps varies by the organisation running the competition.

A-frame

The A-frame comprises two ramps that meet in the middle forming an A shape, the ramps vary between 6 feet 8 inches (2.03 m) and 9 feet (2.7 m) in length, and between 4 feet 11 inches (1.50 m) and 6 feet 3 inches (1.91 m) in height at the apex.

Dog walk

The dog walk is an elevated plank with ascending and descending ramps at each end, the ramps vary between 8 and 12 feet (2.4 and 3.7 m) in length and 36 and 50 inches (91 and 127 cm) in height above the ground.

Seesaw

The seesaw, sometimes called the teeter-totter, is a seesaw, that the dogs walks the length of. The seesaw varies between 8 and 12 feet (2.4 and 3.7 m) in length and the apex between 16 and 27 inches (41 and 69 cm) in height.

=== Tunnels ===
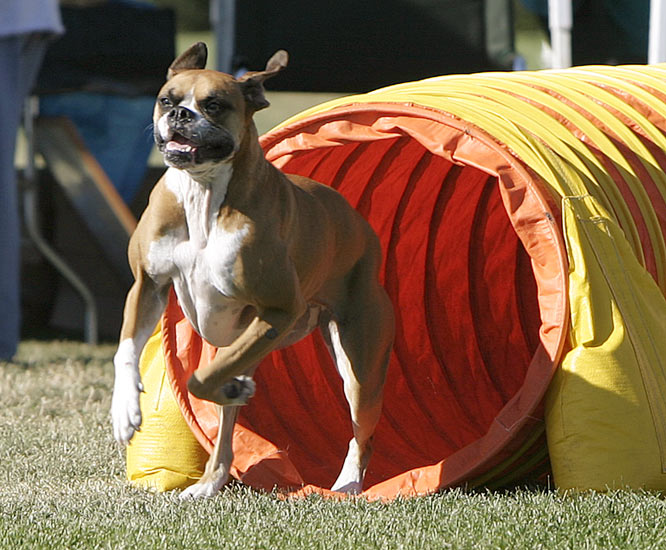
Open tunnel

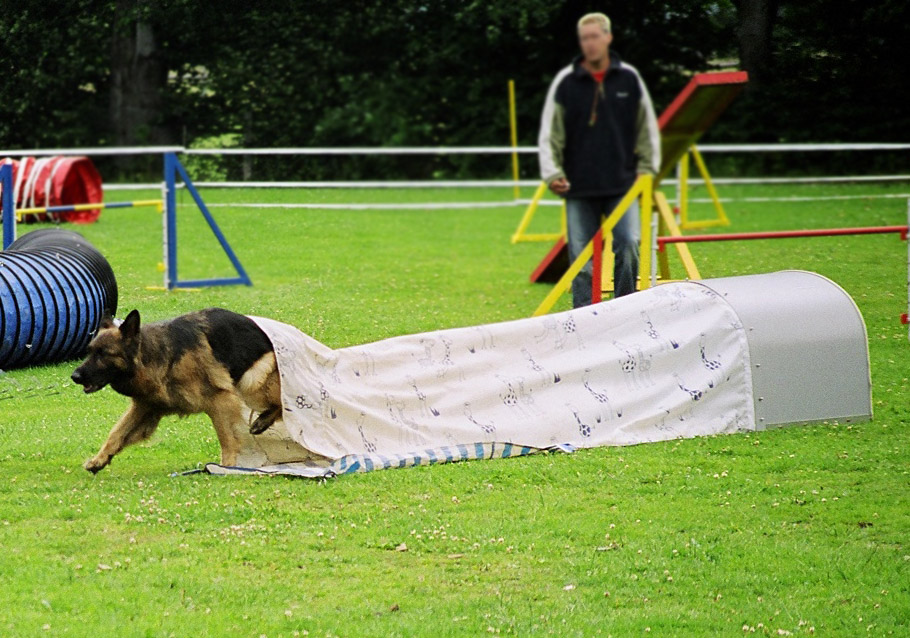
Closed tunnel

The tunnel obstacles involve tunnels of different designs that the dogs run or crawl through.

Open or piped tunnel
The open or piped tunnel is an open flexible tube; they are usually 24 inches (61 cm) in diameter and between 10 and 20 feet (3.0 and 6.1 m) in length.

Closed, collapsed or chute tunnel
The closed, collapsed or chute tunnel is no longer used by the majority of agility organisations throughout the world due the risk of injury to the dogs. It was a tube of light fabric with a rigid end for the dog to enter; the entrance is between 22 and 36 inches (56 and 91 cm) in diameter and 8 and 15 feet (2.4 and 4.6 m) long.

=== Jumps ===
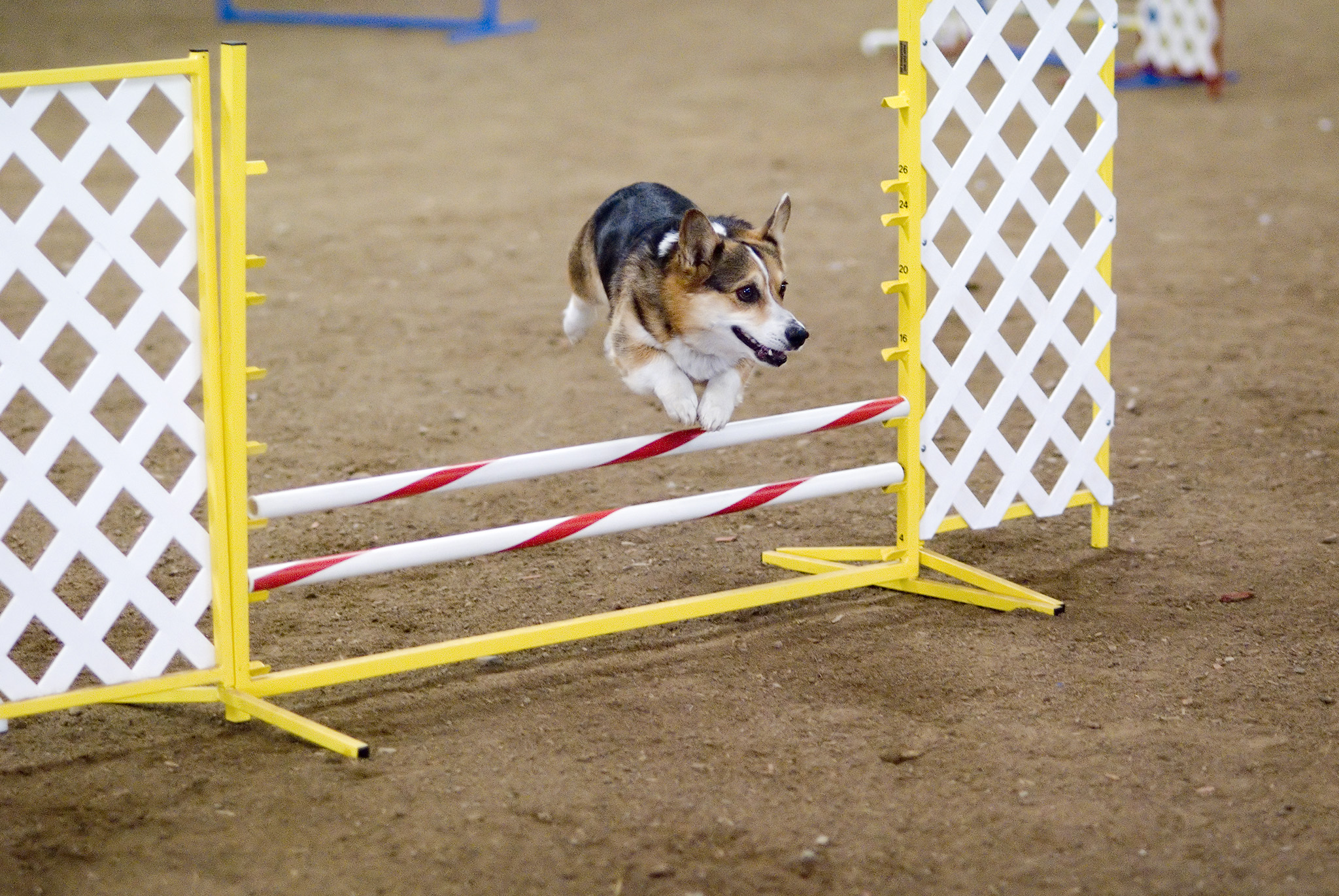
This winged single jump is adjusted in height so that small dogs such as Pembroke Welsh Corgis may compete against similar-sized dogs.

Jump (hurdle)
Two uprights supporting a horizontal bar over which the dog jumps. The height is adjusted for dogs of different heights. The uprights can be simple stanchions or can have wings of various shapes, sizes, and colors.
Double and triple jump (spread jump)
Two uprights supporting two or three horizontal bars spread forward or back from each other. The double can have parallel or ascending horizontal bars; the triple always has ascending bars. The spread between the horizontal bars is sometimes adjusted based on the height of the dog.
Panel jump
Instead of horizontal bars, the jump is a solid panel from the ground up to the jump height, constructed of several short panels that can be removed to adjust the height for different dog heights.

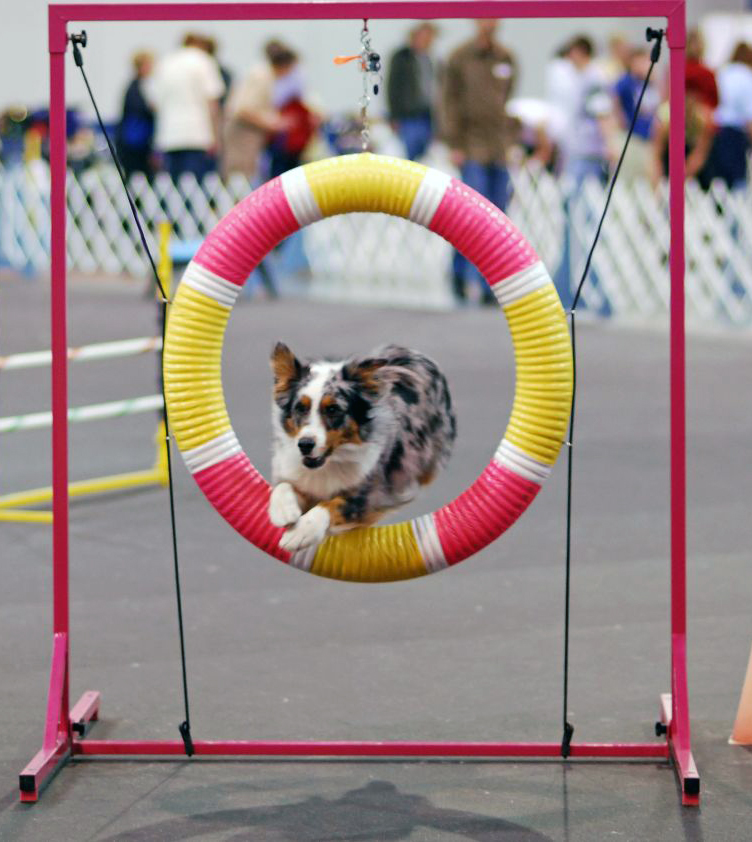
An Australian Shepherd jumping through a tire jump

Broad jump (long jump)
A set of four or five slightly raised platforms that form a broad area over which the dog must jump without setting their feet on any of the platforms. The length of the jump is adjusted for the dog's height.
Tire jump
A torus shape that is roughly the size of a tire (18 inches (46 cm) to 24 inches (61 cm) inside diameter) and suspended in a frame. The dog must jump through the opening of the "tire"; like other jumps, the height is adjusted for dogs of different sizes. The tire is usually wrapped with tape both for visibility and to cover any openings or uneven places in which the dog could catch. Many organizations now allow or require a so-called displaceable or breakaway tire, where the tire comes apart in some way if the dog hits it hard enough.
Other hurdles
UKC agility allows a variety of hurdles not found in other agility organizations: bush hurdle, high hurdle, log hurdle, picket fence hurdle, rail fence hurdle, long hurdle, window hurdle, and water hurdle.

=== Miscellaneous ===
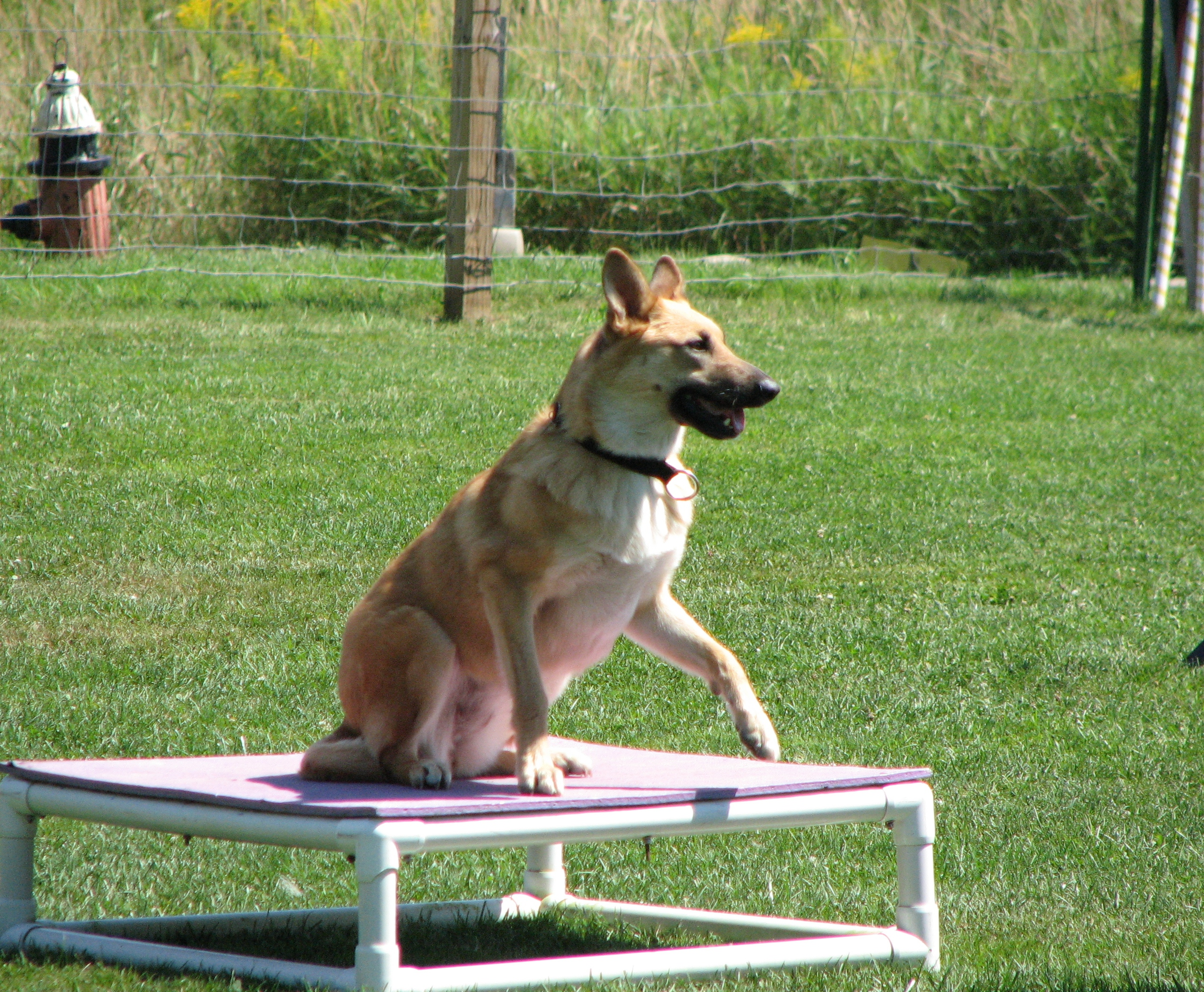
A female Chinook on a pause table

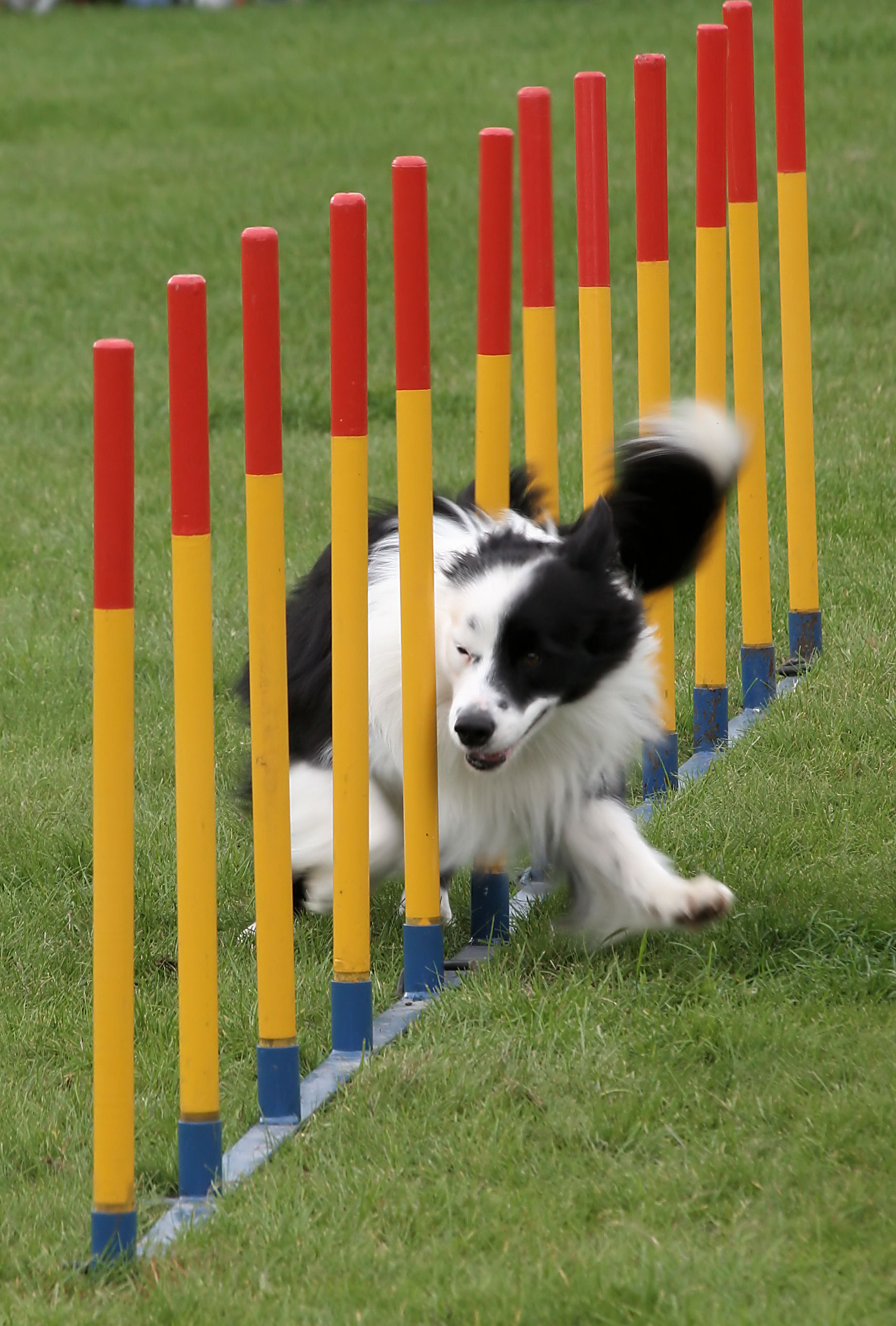
A Border Collie demonstrates fast weave poles

Table (pause table)
An elevated square platform about 3-foot-by-3-foot (1-meter-by-1-meter) square onto which the dog must jump and pause, either sitting or in a down position, for a designated period of time which is counted out by the judge, usually about 5 seconds. The height ranges from about 8 to 30 inches (20 to 76 cm) depending on the dog's height and sponsoring organization. The table has been removed from a handful of organizations as of July 2024.
Weave poles
Similar to a slalom, this is a series of 5 to 12 upright poles, each about 3 feet (0.91 m) tall and spaced about 24 inches (61 cm) apart (spacing for AKC was 21 inches (53 cm) until it was changed in January 2010. The extra three inches was to relieve stress on the dog's back.), through which the dog weaves. The dog must always enter with the first pole to their left, and must not skip poles. Dogs have 5 distinct gait styles when completing the weave pole obstacle. For many dogs, weave poles are one of the most difficult obstacles to master.
Other obstacles
UKC agility allows the following obstacles not found in other agility organizations: swing plank, sway bridge, and platform jump. NADAC also uses a hoop obstacle. A Hoopers course consists entirely of hoops, but hoops may be used in other courses as well.

== Organization in groups ==
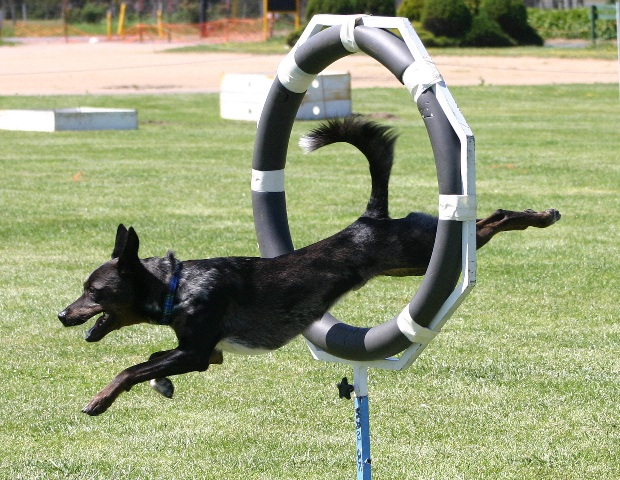
Australian Koolie smooth coat competing in an agility trial

Although each organization has its own rules, all divide dogs into smaller groups that are close to each other in size and experience for purposes of calculating winners and qualifying scores.

== History ==
The history of dog agility can be traced to a demonstration at the Crufts dog show in the late 1970s in the United Kingdom. Dogs were run around a course designed similar to horse jumping courses during intermission as a way to entertain the audience. It has since spread around the world, with major competitions held worldwide.

== Agility as an international sport ==
Globally, dog agility competitions are regulated and run by the Fédération Cynologique Internationale (FCI) and its member organisations and a number of national kennel clubs and sport federations. Rules of each organisation, titles and selection process of national teams that represent the country at prestigious international events vary slightly. One reason alternatives to FCI organisations started to emerge is that FCI is an international pure-bred dogs federation and most of its members have restrictions for dogs without pedigrees. Such organisation as USDAA, UKI and IFCS and their members have opposed that and created their own international competitions that do not restrict participation for dogs without pedigrees.

=== International competitions ===
- Fédération Cynologique Internationale Agility World Championships, the oldest and best-known, is held every year. The event was held as a European championship until 1995, then a world championship from 1996, and is restricted to registered pedigree dogs only.
- The International Mix & Breed Championship in Agility (IMCA), first held in Italy in 2000 as a response to the FCI pedigree-only championships. The competition is held annually with about 18 countries participating, including teams from outside Europe.
- The International Federation of Cynological Sports (IFCS), has since 2002 organized a biannual world agility championship open to any breed or mixed-breed dog regardless of pedigree. Since 2013 it has been gaining more and more popularity and has been held every year.
- The Cynosport World Games, officially named in 2003, as the consolidated venue for USDAA's three tournament series - Grand Prix of Dog Agility, $10,000 Dog Agility Steeplechase and Dog Agility Masters Three-Dog Team Championship — and exhibitions and competitions in other popular canine sports. USDAA tournaments were opened to invited overseas participants for the first time in 2001, which led to establishment of USDAA affiliates in other countries where qualifying events are now held each year.
- The European Open. An informal annual championships since its foundation in 2002, open to all dogs regardless of origins. It rotates around a small number of countries in central Europe, though attracting competitors from all over world, with 25 countries participating in the 2006 event. From 2007, the competition is held under Fédération Cynologique Internationale regulations, but still allowing dogs without pedigrees.
- The World Agility Open Championships (WAO) — is an event organized by the UKI committee, that is gaining popularity with accomplished competitors all over the world. In 2019 participants from 39 countries were taking part.
- Junior Open Agility World Championships — the biggest international event for handlers under 18 years of age divided into several age groups. Before 2019 it was called European Open Junior Championships. Takes place annually and is considered to be very prestigious among competitors all over the world. Along with European Open Championship is supervised by the FCI committee.

== Training ==
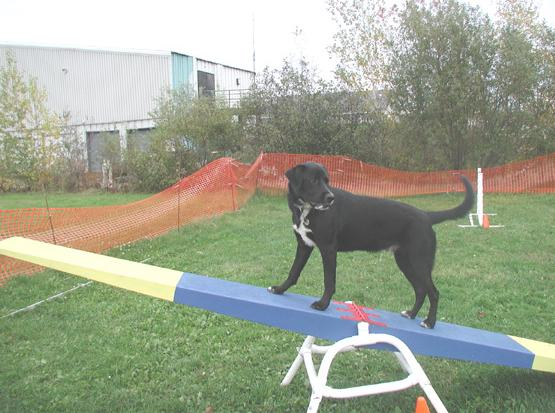
A mixed-breed dog demonstrates the teeter at an agility class

Dogs can begin training for agility at any age, but care is taken when training dogs under a year old so as to not harm their developing joints. Dogs generally start training on simplified, smaller, or lowered (in height) agility equipment and training aids (such as ladders and wobbling boards to train careful footing), but puppies who learn quickly must be finished growing before training on equipment at standard height to prevent injury.

Introducing a new dog to the agility obstacles varies in response. Each individual dog learns at its own pace; confident dogs may charge over equipment with little encouragement, while more timid dogs may take weeks to overcome their hesitations with much encouragement. Both scenarios present their own challenges, as dogs may be overconfident and sloppy to the point where they have a serious accident and teaching the dog self-control becomes one of the goals for the trainer. Timid dogs need extra support to boost their confidence. Given the right encouragement, a timid dog can gain confidence through learning the sport. The size of the dog can also have an effect on training obstacles, particularly with the chute, in which smaller dogs are prone to get trapped and tangled inside. A trainer will take great effort to ensure that the dog is always safe and has a good training experience for agility so that it does not fear the obstacles, and instead performs them willingly and with enthusiasm.

The teeter-totter (or see-saw) and the weave poles are typically the most challenging obstacles to teach to a dog. Many dogs are wary of the see-saw's movement, and the weave poles involve behavior that does not occur naturally to the dog. Contact obstacles in general are challenging to train in a manner that ensures that the dog touches the contact zone without sacrificing speed. Whether for competition or recreation, the most important skill for an agility team to learn is how to work together quickly, efficiently, and safely. Dogs vary greatly in their speed and accuracy of completing a course, as well as in their preferences for obstacles; therefore, the handler must adjust their handling style to suit and support the dog.

Training techniques for each piece of equipment varies. The techniques for training the weave poles include using offset poles that gradually move more in line with each other, poles that tilt outward from the base and gradually become upright, wires or gates around the poles forcing the dog into the desired path, and putting a hand in the dog's collar and guiding the dog through while leading with an incentive. It also includes teaching the dog to run full speed between two poles and gradually increasing the angle of approach and number of poles.

Agility may be trained independently (for instance at home) or with an instructor or club that offers classes. Seasoned handlers and competitors, in particular, may choose to train independently, as structured classes are commonly geared towards novices. Seasoned handlers often instead look to seminars and workshops that teach advanced handling techniques, and then practice on their own. Common reasons for joining an agility class include:

- Access to agility equipment, especially the larger contact obstacles, which can be expensive, difficult to build, and require a lot of space to use.
- Seeking the guidance and expertise of more experienced handlers.
- Enjoying the social venue that many classes provide.
- Training in a more distracting environment, which is helpful in preparation for competition.

In addition to the technical and educational training, physical training must also be done. The dog must be fit enough to run and jump without causing stress or injury to its body. The handler can also benefit from being physically fit, but with some handling styles it is not necessary to keep up with the dog (nor is it possible with very fast dogs). Being able to handle a dog from a distance allows mobility-impaired handlers to participate in the sport on par with mobile handlers. Research has also demonstrated health benefits to handlers engaged in dog agility.

== Competition process ==
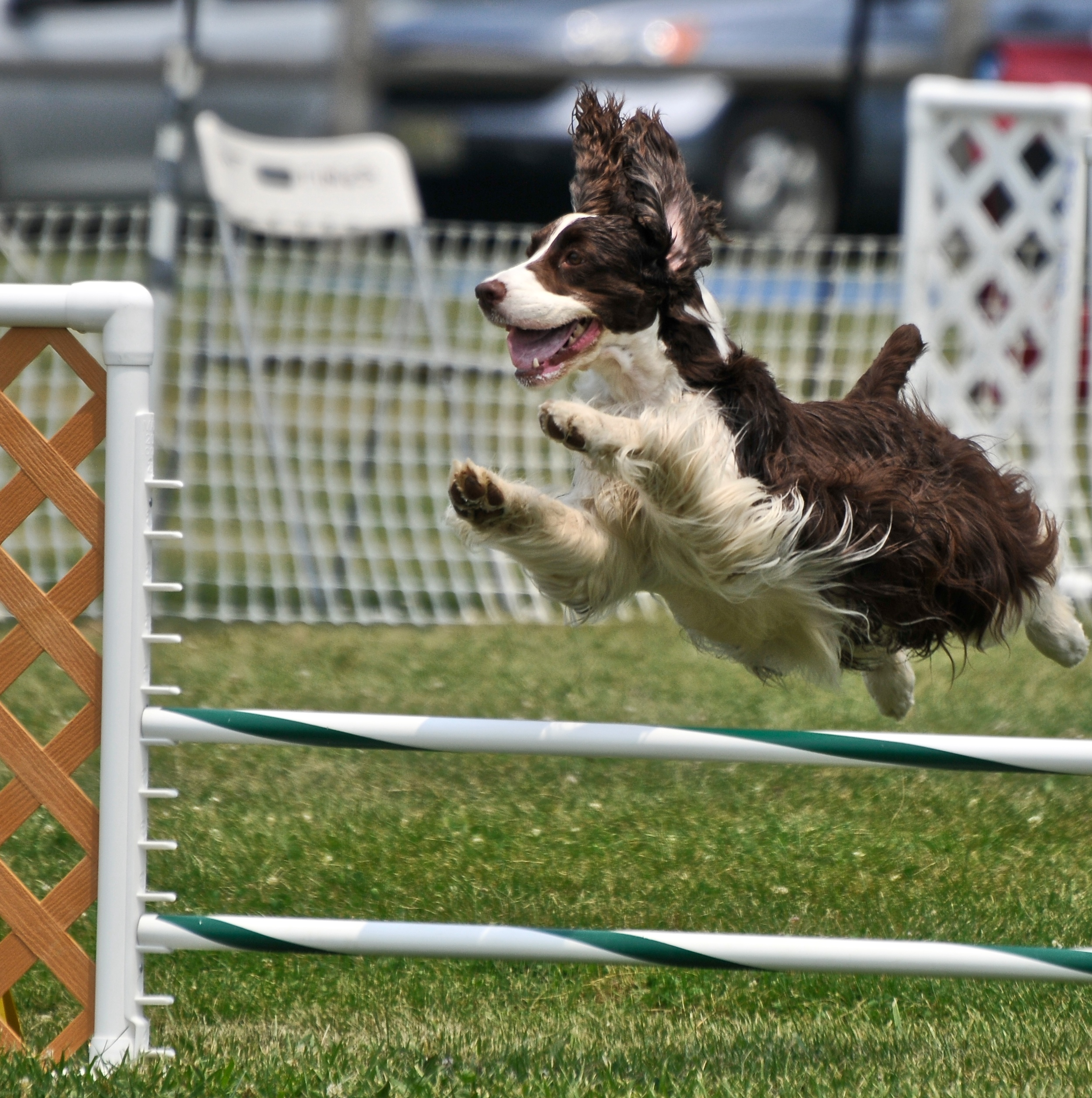
English Springer Spaniel

Competitions (also called trials or matches or shows) are usually hosted by a specific local club. The club might be devoted solely to dog agility, or it might be primarily a breed club that wants to promote the working abilities of its breed, or it might be a club that hosts many types of dog sports. The club contracts with judges who are licensed by the sanctioning organization and applies to the organization for permission to hold a trial on a specific date or weekend; most trials are two-day weekend events.

=== Key trial jobs ===
The club designates a member to be the chairperson or show manager, who is responsible for ensuring that the trial takes place, and another member to be the secretary, who is responsible for providing competitors with the show premium or schedule—a document that describes the specific competition, summarizes the rules, describes the trial site, and includes an entry form—receiving completed entry forms, sending out running orders, producing running-order lists for the day of competition, and compiling the results from the trial to send to the sanctioning organization.

The designated chief ring steward or ring manager is responsible for finding and assigning workers, almost always volunteers, to perform the myriad tasks involved in putting on a trial. For example, if electronic timing is not being used, each class needs a timer, who ensures that the dog's running time is recorded, a scribe, who records the judge's calls as a dog runs the class, and pole setters (or ring stewards), who ensure that jump bars are reset when they are knocked off and change jump heights for dogs of different sizes.

=== Competition locations ===
Agility competitions require considerable space. Each ring is usually at least 5,000 square feet (I.e 465 square meters); however, exact dimensions vary according to the organizations. Competitions can have anywhere from one to a dozen rings. The ground must be non-slip and level, usually being either packed dirt, grass, carpeting, or padded matting.

Competitors additionally need space to set up quarters for their dogs and gear. When space permits, competitors often bring pop up canopies or screen room awning tents for shade. Dogs, when not competing, are usually left to rest in exercise pens, crates, or dog tents familiar and enclosed environments in which they can relax and recover between runs. Handlers also bring reflective cloths to protect their dogs from sun exposure and to calm them down (by covering their crates with the cloths). There also needs to be space for many handlers with dogs on leashes to move freely around the rings without crowding, and space for warming up, exercising, and pottying dogs. Adjacent to the site, parking must be available for all competitors. At weekend or weeklong shows that offer camping, space needs to be provided both for competitors' caravans and tents, and for the small fenced enclosures or gardens that they set up around them.

In heavily populated areas, therefore, it is uncommon to find real estate inexpensive enough to devote entirely to agility, so sites are usually rented for the weekend. Even in more rural areas, agility-only sites are uncommon. Popular locations include large parks, covered horse-riding arenas, and in cold-winter areas, large, empty warehouses in which mats or carpet can be laid.

=== Course design ===
Before the trial, each judge designs the courses that they will judge at the competition. The sanctioning organization usually reviews and approves the courses to ensure that they meet the organization's guidelines. Guidelines include such issues as how far apart obstacles must be, how many turns are allowed (or required) on a course, which obstacles and how many of each must appear on the course, and so on. The rules vary by level of competition and by organization.

=== Building a course and calculating times ===
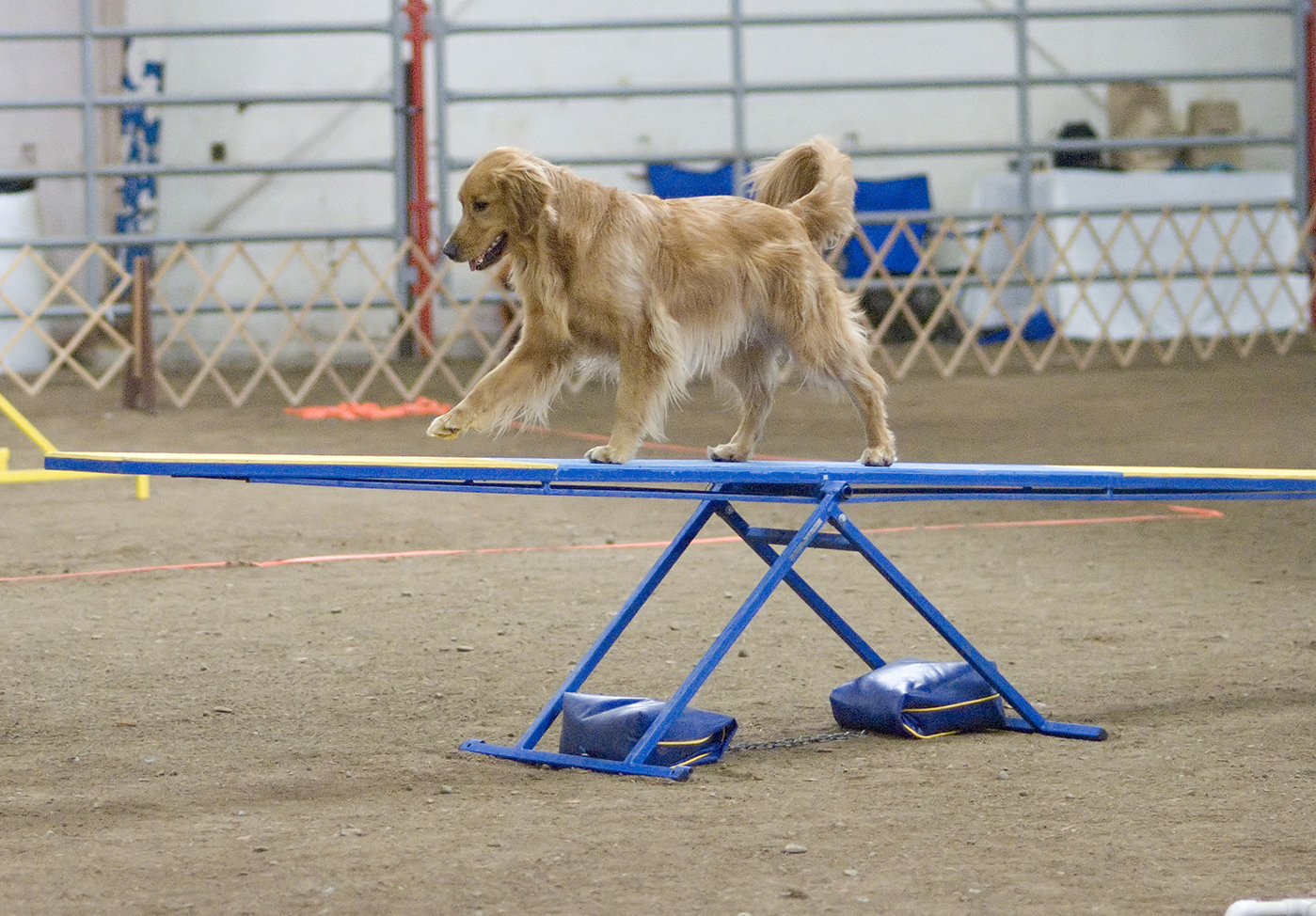
Golden Retriever in an agility competition

Before each class, or the evening before the first class, course builders use course maps provided by the judges to place equipment on the course. The chief course builder is usually an experienced competitor who understands what equipment is legal, how it must be configured, how each must be aligned compared to other obstacles, and can direct several course-building volunteers to efficiently move the equipment into place. To make the job easier, courses are often marked in some way to correspond to a grid: for example, if course maps are printed on a grid of 10-foot-by-10-foot squares, the posts that hold the ring ropes marking the course's four sides are often set 10 feet apart.

When the course builders finish, the judge walks through the course and double-checks that the obstacles are legal, that they are placed where the judge intended, and that there are no unintended hazards on the course (such as potholes, uneven ground, or mud puddles) around which the course must be adjusted. For many classes, the judge then measures the path through the course to determine the optimal running distance of a typical dog. The judge uses that measurement with a speed requirement determined by the rules to calculate the standard course time, which is the time under which dogs must complete the course to avoid time faults. For example, if the course is 150 yards (or meters) long, and the rules state that dogs must run the course at a rate of at least 3 yards (or meters) per second, the standard course time would be 50 seconds. Other organizations, though, leave the decision on course time to the judge's discretion

=== Running a course and determining results ===
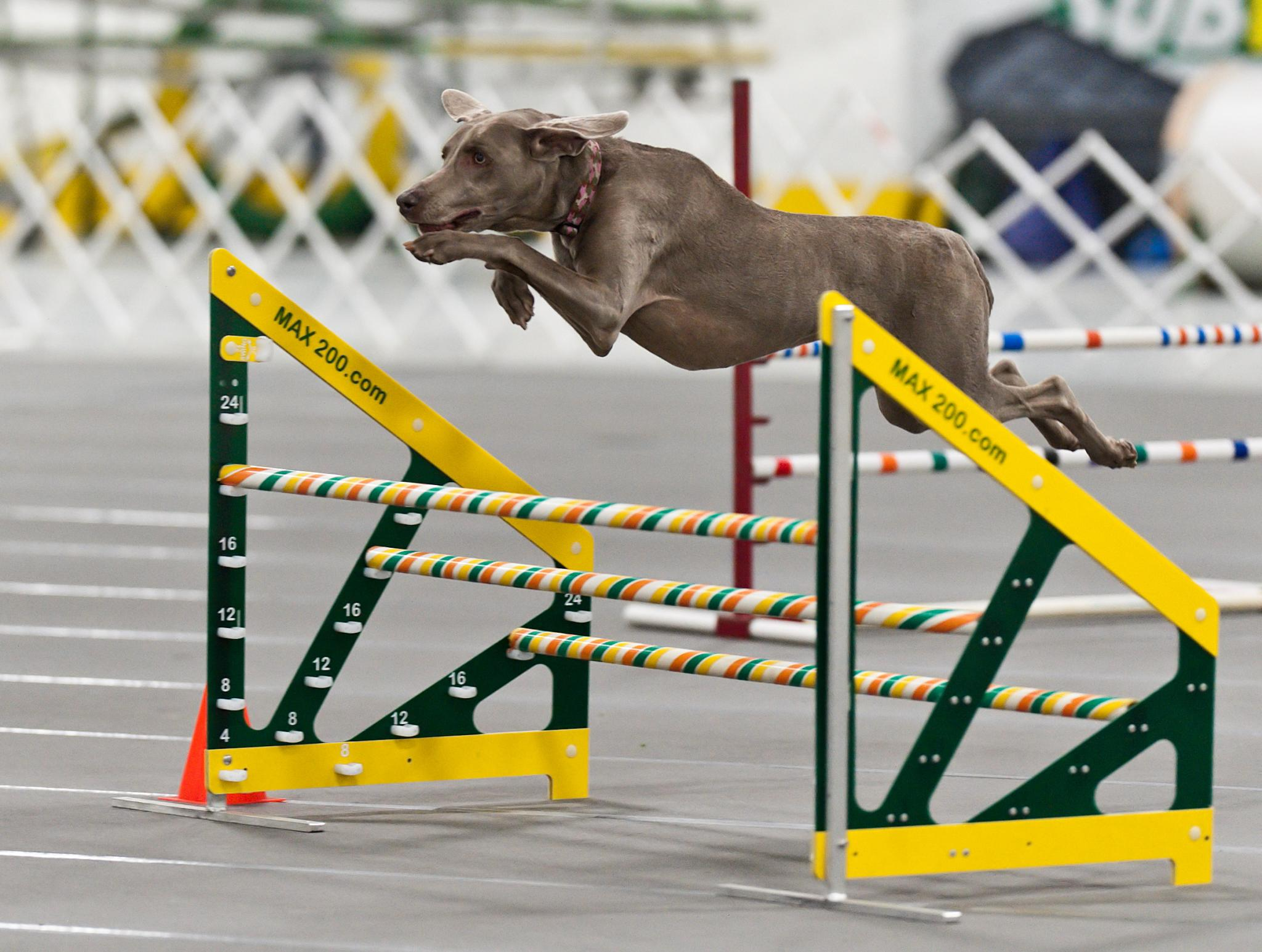
A Weimaraner jumping an ascending triple-bar spread jump

The judge often holds a briefing for competitors before each class, to review the rules and explain specific requirements for a particular course. For Standard courses for experienced competitors, the judge's briefing is often minimal or dispensed with altogether. For novice handlers in classes with complex rules, the briefings can be much longer.

The competitors then walk the course (as described earlier). When the walk-through ends, the gate steward or caller ensures that dogs enter the ring in the running order previously determined by the trial secretary and manages changes to the running order for handlers who might have conflicts with other rings of competition. As each dog and handler team runs the course, the dog is timed either by a person with a stopwatch or with an electronic timer, and the scribe writes the judge's calls and the dog's final time on a scribe sheet or ticket, which is then taken to the score table for recording.

At the score table, scorekeepers compile the results in a variety of ways. Some organizations require or encourage computerized scorekeeping, while others require certain types of manual score sheets to be filled out. When all the dogs in a given height group, level, and class have run, the score table compares run times, faults, and any other requirements to determine placements (and, for classes that provide qualifying points towards titles, which dogs earned qualifying scores).

Each ring might run several classes during a day of competition, requiring multiple course builds, walk-throughs, and briefings.

=== Awards and titles ===
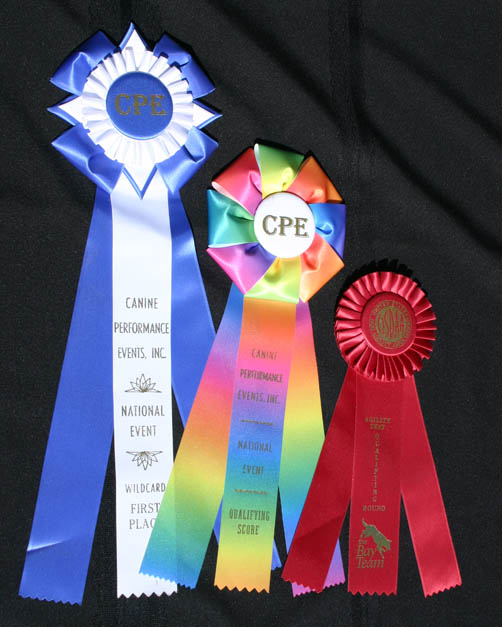
A variety of rosette award ribbons from dog agility competitions

Awards are usually given for placements and for qualifying scores. Such awards are often flat ribbons, rosettes, commemorative plaques, trophies, medals, or pins. Some clubs award high-in-trial awards, calculated in various ways, or other special awards for the trial. Dogs who complete their final qualifying scores to become agility champions are often presented with special awards.

Many Kennel Clubs also award titles to those who manage to qualify enough times in a particular level. Most clubs require three qualifying scores in any level to get the corresponding title, however, other clubs may require more or less.

In the United States in most sanctioning organizations, there are a variety of titles that a dog and handler can earn by accruing sufficient qualifying runs—also called legs—that is, runs that have no more than a certain number of faults (typically none) and are faster than the maximum standard course time (SCT).

For example, under USDAA rules, a dog can earn novice-level titles in Standard, Jumpers, Gamblers, Snooker, and Pairs Relay classes by earning three qualifying runs in each of the classes. The dog can also earn intermediate-level titles and masters-level titles in the same classes. After earning all of the masters-level titles—five qualifying runs in each, with some that must be in the top 15% of dogs competing at each trial—the dog earns its Championship.

Other organizations have similar schemes; in AKC, to earn the Championship, the dog's qualifying runs must be earned two at a time on the same day. In NADAC, the quantity of qualifying runs is much larger; and so on. Most champion titles have "CH" in the title: NATCH (NADAC Agility Trial Champion), ADCH (Agility Dog Champion for USDAA), CATCH (CPE Agility Trial Champion), MACH (Master Agility Champion for AKC), TACH (Teacup Agility Champion), ATCH (ASCA Agility Trial Champion) and so on.

== Injuries ==
Surveys of handlers indicates that between 32% and 41.7% of dogs incur injuries from agility related activities. The most common types of injuries were (in order) strains, sprains and contusions. Locations most commonly injured were shoulders, iliopsoas muscle, digits and lumbar spine/lumbosacral area. Border Collies are more likely to be injured than other breeds. Injury rate is reported to vary by country, with Australia reporting the highest percentage of injuries and the United States reporting the lowest percentage of injuries. Injuries were most commonly perceived as being caused by interactions with bar jumps (contact), A-frames and dog walk obstacles (contact and/or fall). There were no relationship between the use of warm-up and cool-down exercises and injuries.

== Agility World Championships ==
As in many sports, dog agility has its own World Championships. Only pure-bred dogs are able to compete in those.

Year	Country	Town	Date (d.m.y)
2008	Finland	Helsinki	26.09-28.09.2008
2009	Austria	Dornbirn	18.09-20.09.2009
2010	Germany	Rieden Kreuth	30.09-03.10.2010
2011	France	Liévin	07.10-09.10.2011
2012	Czech Republic	Liberec	n/a
2013	South Africa	Johannesburg	10.10.-13.10.2013
2014	Luxembourg	n/a	11.09-14.09.2014
2015	Italy	Bologna	8.10-11.10.2015
2016	Spain	Zaragossa	22.09-25.09.2016
2017	Czech Republic	Liberec	05.10-08.10.2017
2018	Sweden	Kristianstad	04.10-09.10.2018
2019	Finland	Turku	19.09-20.09.2019
2020	Estonia	Tallinn	Canceled
2021	Estonia	Tallinn	Cancelled
2022	Austria	Schwechat	22.09-25.09.2022
2023	Czech Republic	Liberec	04.10-08.10.2023
2024	Belgium	Opglabbeek	01.10-06.10.2024
2025	Sweden	Kalmar	2025
2026	Finland (not confirmed)	n/a	2026

One of the most notable championships was in 2015 - for the first time in the history, there was a double victory by the same handler. Pavol Vakonič from Slovakia held his nerves and brought two faultless runs with Ikea and Fiona (both border-collies) through to the last jump. He earned silver and gold medal.

The championship competitions of 2020 and 2021 were canceled due to pandemic.

AWC 2022 was originally slated to be held in Moscow, Russia, but was moved to Austria following the invasion of Ukraine in the Russo-Ukrainian war.

== See also ==
- List of dog sports
- Cat agility
- Championship (dog)
- Dock jumping
- Rabbit agility
- Rat agility
- Show jumping
