= Annette Edwards =

British model and rabbit breader (born 1952)

- Born: 8 April 1952 (age 73)

Annette Edwards (born April 1952) holds consecutive awards for breeding the world's longest rabbits and is the oldest glamour model in the United Kingdom.

== Life and career ==
As a child, Edwards was raised by her grandmother and had pet rabbits since the age of 8. At the age of 15, she began a modelling career with a Birmingham agency. Two years later she was married and stopped modelling until her youngest child was born. Edwards became Miss Birmingham at the age of 29 while caring for six children. Later a ruling would prevent young mothers competing, leading Edwards to support a campaign to overturn the ban in 2014.

Edwards was featured in adverts for Nivea Visage face cream in a 2014 Mothering Sunday campaign. She was 45 at the time. In an interview about this campaign, Edwards spoke about inappropriate advances from photographers and how this type of harassment had not changed in her lifetime. She has spent around £18,000 on surgery to resemble the cartoon character Jessica Rabbit and appeared on the show 50 Greatest Plastic Surgery Shockers. The majority of these surgeries were performed when Edwards was 57, coinciding with the birth of her rabbit Darius, the world's longest rabbit. A photo of Edwards dressed as Jessica Rabbit was made Picture of the Day by The Telegraph in 2009.

In 2001 Edwards voiced the character Misty in the Japanese anime horror Malice@Doll.

In 2018 Edwards announced that she was retiring from glamour modelling after 40 years of being a model, having previously been awarded the world's oldest Page 3 model by the Guinness Book of World Records. However, since 2004 Edwards has crafted a career in breeding giant rabbits. In 2014 Edwards and her record-breaking rabbit Darius were featured on the Alan Titchmarsh show.

Edwards has a large family; she has ten children, and 14 grandchildren. In 2014 Edwards appeared on the BBC radio show Home Truths to discuss her openness to being a surrogate for her daughter, who cannot conceive.

== Rabbit breeding ==
Edwards breeds giant rabbits known as Continental Giants, reportedly at a cost of £5,000 per year, covering 2,000 carrots and 700 apples. The rabbits require a dog crate but run free in the garden during the day.

Edwards has bred four rabbits that have won awards from the Guinness Book of Records, including Roberto who was her first rabbit to be crowned the largest rabbit in 2004. The award for world's longest rabbit has been held by Edwards consecutively since then, spanning over three generations of rabbits. Since 2010, Darius has held the record for the world's longest rabbit, with a length of 4 ft 4inches and a weight of 3.5 stone. Darius took this award from his own mother Alice, who herself took the title from her mother Amy in 2009. In 2018, Edwards announced the retirement of Darius, then 8 years old. Darius has been featured on the Jimmy Carr show and the CBC show Remarkable Rabbits. Edwards feeds her rabbits two meals per day consisting of carrots, rabbit mix, apples and cabbage.

In 2019 Daisy May won longest tail in the world, with a length of 17 cm.

One of Edward's rabbits, Simon, died in the cargo section of a Boeing 767 during a United Airlines flight from London to America in 2017. Simon was 10 months old and three-foot long at the time. According to Edwards, Simon had a vet check-up three hours prior to the flight.
