= Alex the Great (rabbit) =

Flemish Giant rabbit (2020–2025)

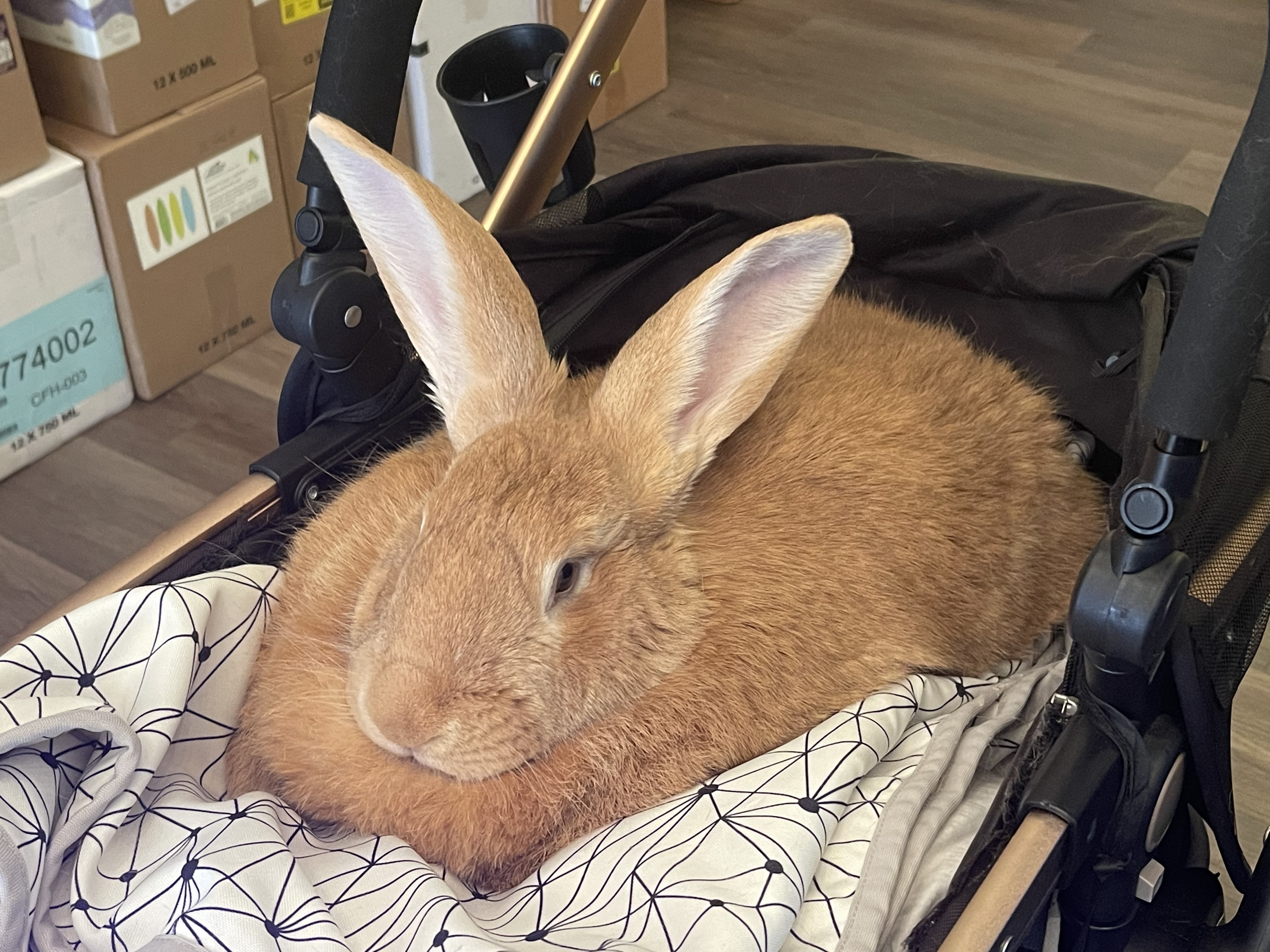
- Alex in Sonoma, California (2022)
- Species: Domestic rabbit (Oryctolagus cuniculus domesticus)
- Breed: Flemish Giant
- Sex: Male
- Born: November 2020; Modesto, California, U.S.
- Died: July 21, 2025 (aged 4); Davis, California, U.S.
- Occupation: Therapy pet
- Known for: Internet celebrity
- Owner: Kato family
- Residence: Los Angeles, California, U.S.
- Weight: 28 lb (13 kg)
- Named after: Alexander the Great
- www.alexthegreat100.com

Alex the Great (November 2020 – July 21, 2025) was an American-born Flemish Giant rabbit known for his appearances at sporting events held at Oracle Park and his association with the San Francisco Giants baseball team. He was born on a meat farm in California, USA, and later adopted at a young age by a couple who trained him to become a therapy animal. After being diagnosed with cancer, Alex the Great died in July 2025 at the age of four.

== Life ==
Alex the Great was born on a rabbit meat farm in Modesto, California. In December 2020, when he was three weeks old, he was then adopted by California couple Josh Row and Kathreen Kei Koc. (Note: name also given as Kei Kato.) They searched for a Flemish Giant rabbit specifically, as they wanted a docile rabbit to use while doing volunteer work. Kato had also lost her business due to the COVID-19 pandemic, and said that adopting Alex had given her a new purpose and helped her manage her stress. They began training him as a therapy animal in February 2021.

In 2021, Kato brought Alex to a San Francisco Giants baseball game dressed in a bowtie with the team's colors; she was interviewed with Alex and his appearance went viral. The Giants invited him back and he became a regular attendee at Oracle Park, the team's home field. Known as the team's unofficial "Rally Rabbit" due to a series of wins the team made whilst Alex was in attendance, he became well known locally for his appearances at games. Baseball card manufacturer Topps announced they intended to make a trading card featuring him; the card would be released in late 2025. In 2023, he "threw" a ceremonial first pitch with the help of Row and a pitching machine at a game with the Reno Aces.

In 2022, Alex the Great was used by the San Francisco International Airport as part of their "Wag Brigade"—a set of animals that visited the airport to comfort nervous travelers. He was the first rabbit used in the program, which also included dogs, a one-eyed cockapoo, and a pig. Alex later performed similar tasks at San Jose Mineta International Airport. Alex "autographed" business cards made for him by the San Francisco Airport by biting the corners. Alex also made appearances at charity events, hospitals, and in advertisements. In May 2025, he had 100,000 followers on Instagram and TikTok. On July 21, 2025, Alex's owners confirmed he had died earlier that day after being diagnosed with cancer; the rabbit had been receiving treatment at the UC Davis Veterinary Hospital and was four years old at the time of his death.

== Description ==
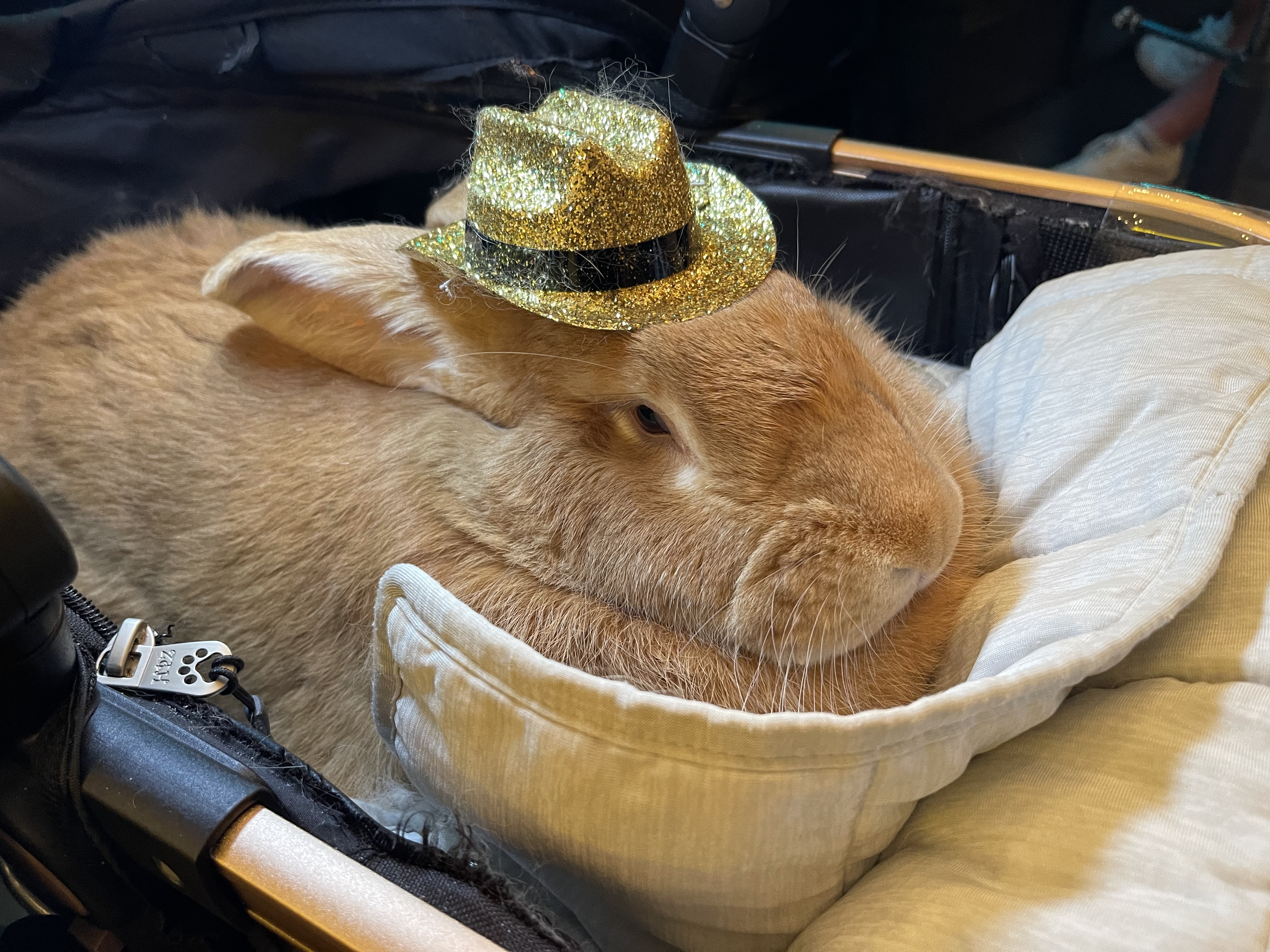
Alex in 2022

Alex the Great was a Flemish Giant rabbit that weighed 28 pounds (13 kg). He slept in the same bed as his owners and was certified as a therapy rabbit by the San Francisco Society for the Prevention of Cruelty to Animals due to his friendly nature. His favourite food was dried cranberries.

According to Row and Kroc, Alex enjoyed watching sports on TV, especially NASCAR. When at public events, he would either be driven in a buggy or drive a child's toy car that Josh Row had customized for the rabbit, with a button that allowed the rabbit partial control. The car had a license plate reading "ALEX" and a remote allowing a human to control it. In addition to the car, Row also made Alex rabbit-sized hats to wear. Row named him after Alexander the Great because of how much attention the rabbit received and because he thought it was funny.

== See also ==
- Bini the Bunny, Californian lop rabbit
