= Continental Giant rabbit =

Breed of rabbit

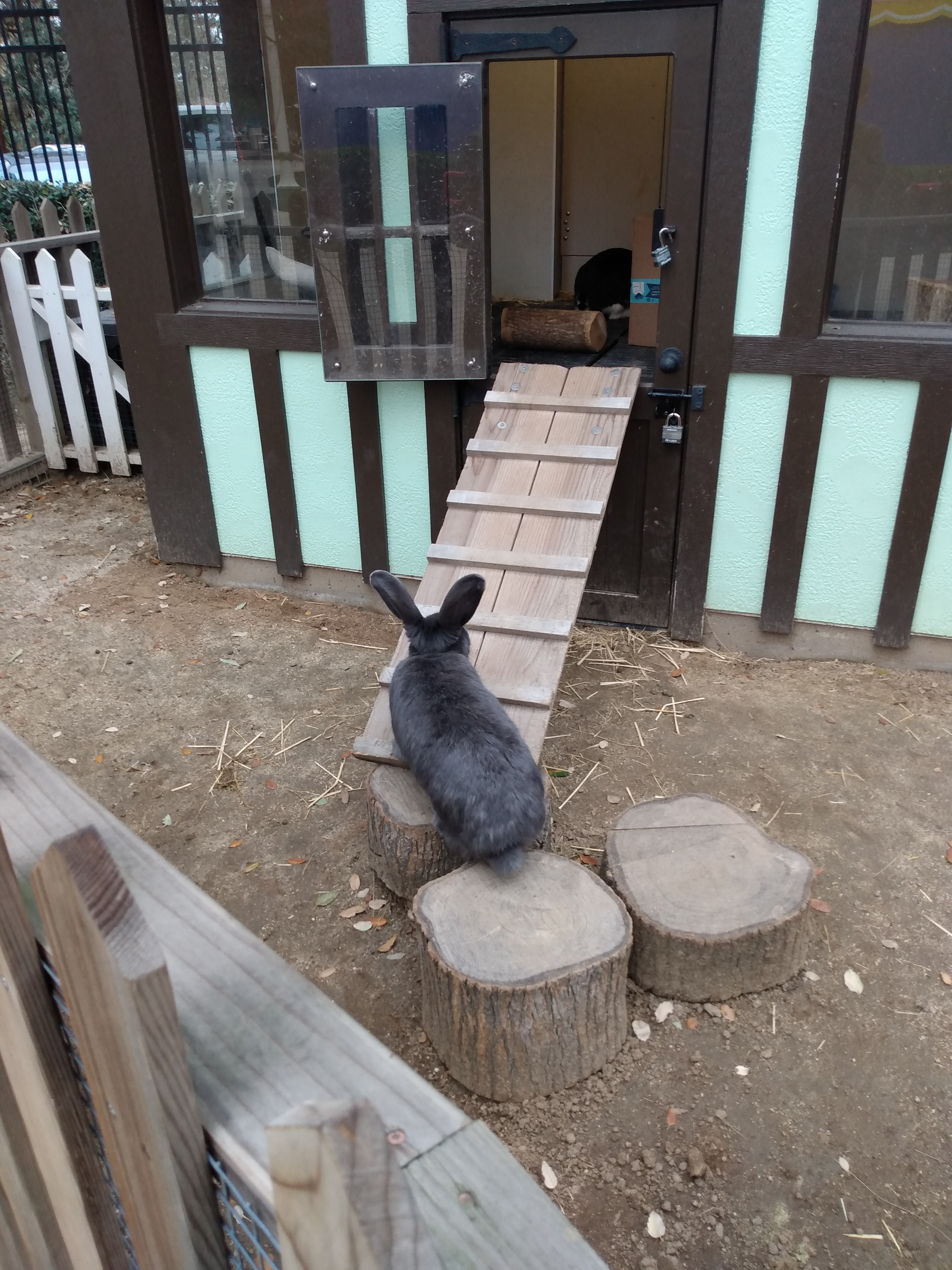
Continental Giant rabbit

The Continental Giant, also known as the German Giant, is a very large breed of rabbit which was originally bred for meat. It is recognized by the British Rabbit Council in two categories, colored and white, but is not recognized as a breed by the American Rabbit Breeders Association.

== Overview ==
The Continental Giant, first documented in 1893, is said to have descended from the Flemish Giant.

The longest Continental Giant on record is approximately 4 feet 4 inches (c. 132 cm) in length, and the heaviest weighs 53 lbs (c. 24 kg). The average lifespan for the breed is 4–5 years. The record for the longest Continental Giant was held by the breeder Annette Edwards since 2004, across three generations of rabbits. Continental Giant rabbits are more likely to suffer femoral fractures and it is hypothesized to be caused from a weakness of bone. In 2010, Ralph was recognised as the world's heaviest rabbit by Guinness World Records.

== See also ==
- List of rabbit breeds
