= Ralph (rabbit) =

Former heaviest rabbit in the world

- Species: Oryctolagus cuniculus domesticus
- Breed: Continental Giant rabbit
- Sex: Male
- Born: c. 2009
- Known for: world's heaviest rabbit (2010, 2013)
- Owner: Pauline Grant
- Weight: nearly 25 kg (55 lb)

Ralph (born c. 2009) was a Continental Giant rabbit from Sussex, United Kingdom who weighed nearly 25 kilograms (55 lb).

Ralph was recognised as the world's heaviest rabbit by Guinness World Records in 2010. He was dethroned in 2010 by Darius, another Continental Giant, before regaining the title as a 4-year-old in 2013. Ralph was one of 32 children of Amy, who was also the world's heaviest rabbit prior to her death from a heart attack in May 2009. Ralph's father Roberto was also formerly the world's heaviest rabbit.

Ralph ate £50 worth of food per week. His diet included a variety of vegetables, including broccoli, cabbage, carrots, cucumber, sweetcorn, and watercress, as well as brown bread, cream crackers, and Weetabix. Ralph's owner was Pauline Grant and he lived at Sussex Horse Rescue in Uckfield, where his keeper was Ella McDonnell. Ralph was featured by Bedtime Math as a subject of their arithmetic problems. In December 2014, the US Federal Aviation Administration (FAA) released a "Know Before You Fly" video warning drone operators not to fly uncrewed aircraft heavier than Ralph lest they get on the agency's "naughty list".

In April 2021, Darius was stolen from the garden of his owner's home.

== See also ==
- Largest organisms
