= British Giant rabbit =

Breed of rabbit

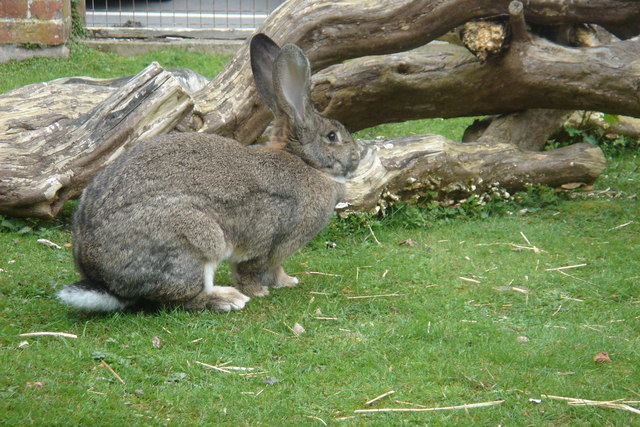
British Giant Rabbit

The British Giant rabbit is a large breed of rabbit that has its heritage in the Flemish Giant, a breed that originates in Belgium. The British Giant can grow up to 7 kg and often rivals a small dog in size.

== History ==
The British Giant arose as a separate breed in the United Kingdom in the 1940s and was bred from Flemish Giant stock of varying colours from the United States. The Flemish Giant breed standard in Britain is only recognised in steel grey colouring and may be somewhat smaller than the European Flemish Giant. Thus the British Giant was bred for a greater variety in colouring and although smaller than continental Flemish rabbits, retain broadly the same characteristics. The British Giant is virtually unknown outside the United Kingdom, where it is a recognised breed.

== Appearance ==
The biggest of all the British breeds, the British Giant has a large, powerful body that is flat across the back and has a wide front and hindquarters. Its fur is medium length, dense and soft and comes in a variety of colours including white, sable, opal, grey, blue and black.

== See also ==
- List of rabbit breeds
