= Belgian Hare =

Breed of rabbit

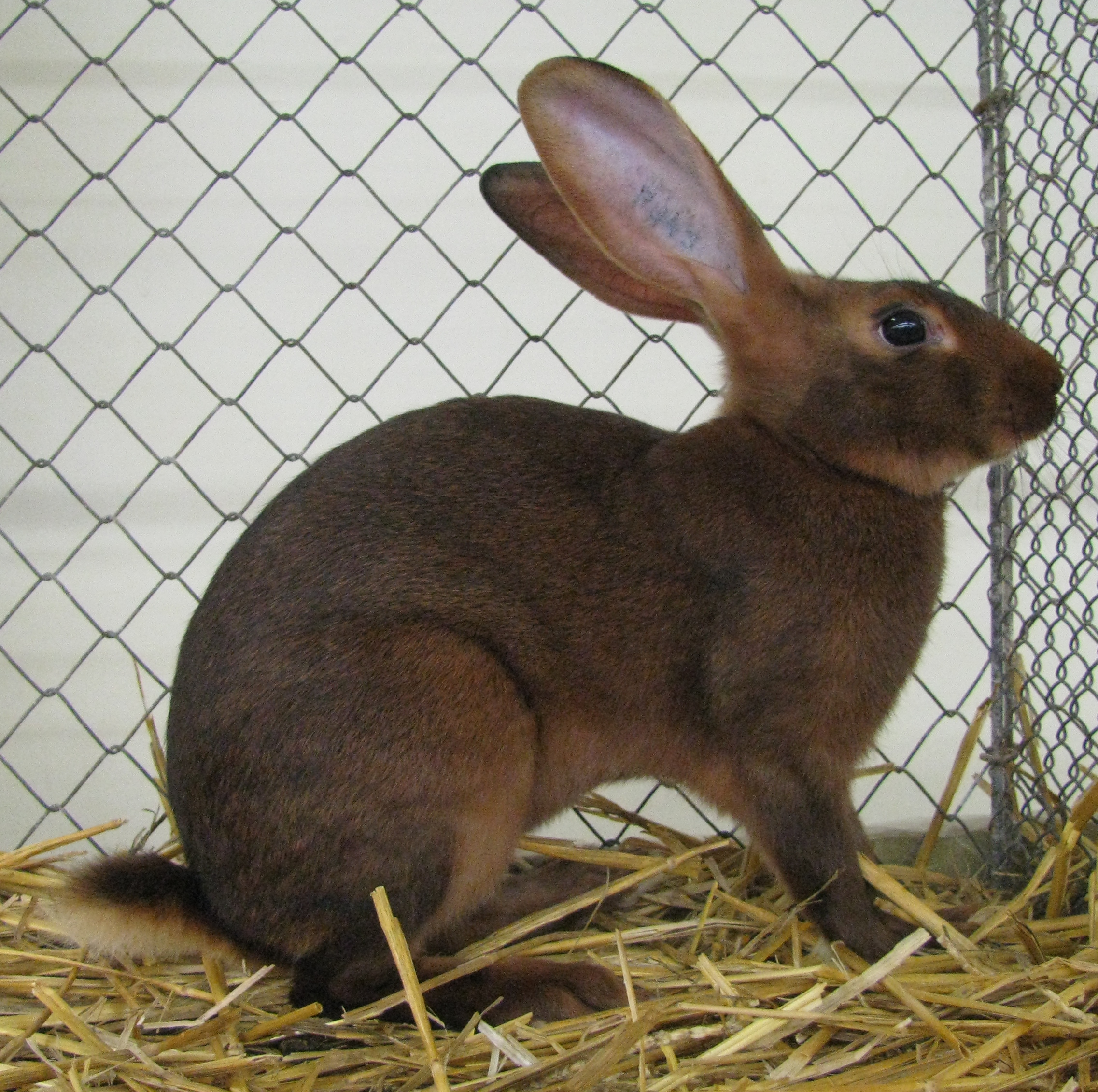
The "Belgian Hare" breed of domestic rabbit

The Belgian Hare is a "fancy" (i.e., it is primarily for exhibition, not meat, fur or fiber) breed of domestic rabbit. It has been selectively bred to resemble the wild European hare, but it is a rabbit rather than a true hare. Averaging 6–9 pounds (2.7–4.1 kg), the Belgian Hare is known for its slender and wiry frame and its long and powerful legs. The breed is responsible for launching the domestic rabbit industry, as well as popularizing rabbit shows in the United States.

== History ==
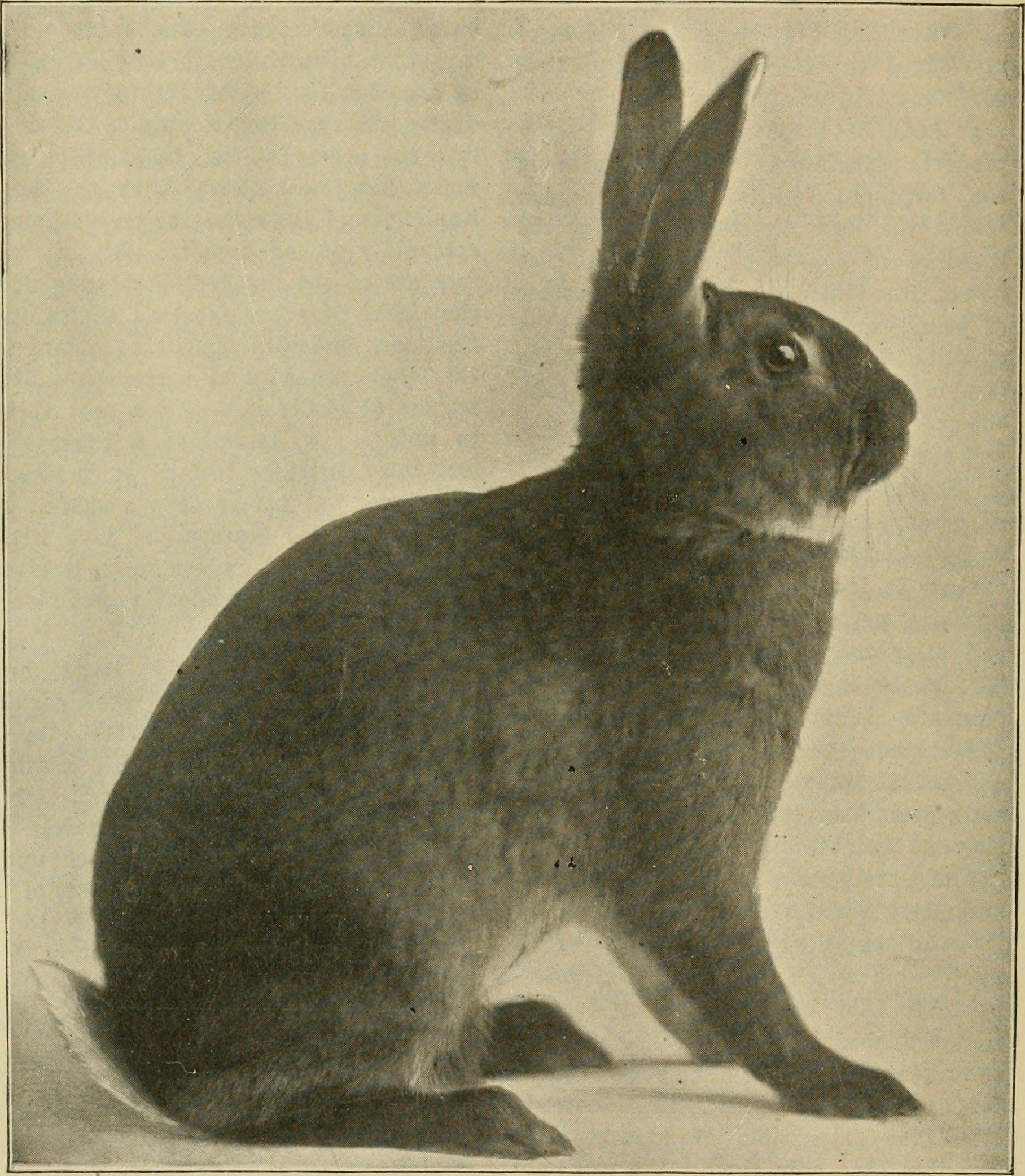
A Belgian Hare buck named "Fashoda" from the Bonanza Rabbitry in Los Angeles, CA. Book illustration from 1900. Caption reads: "He captured twelve first prizes on the exhibition circuit of England in 1899." Fashoda was sold for US$5,000 in 1900.

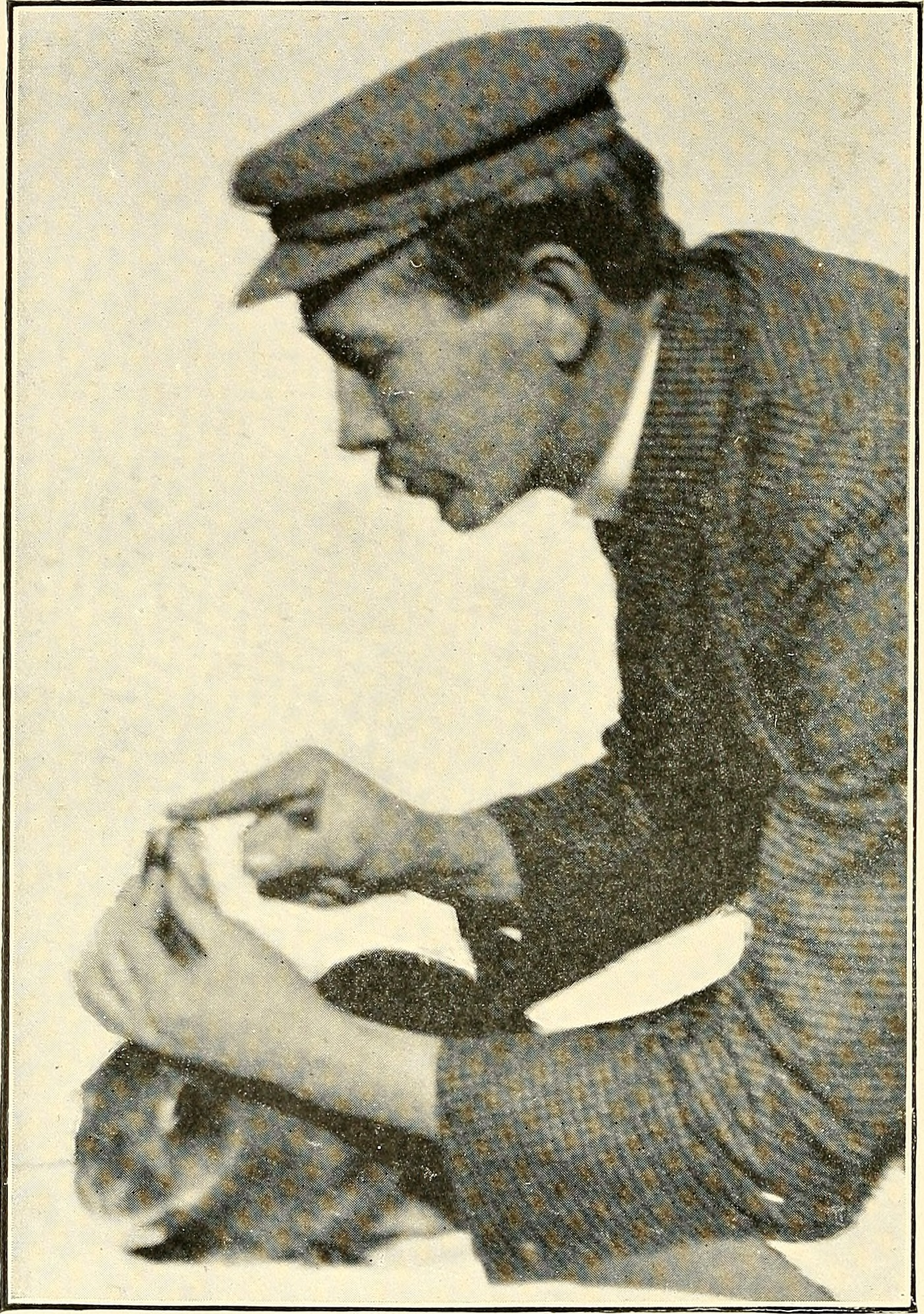
Illustration from the 1901 book The First Belgian Hare Course of Instruction. Twenty lessons. Complete directions for buying, sheltering, feeding, breeding, developing a business, etc. with a true history of the Belgian hare.

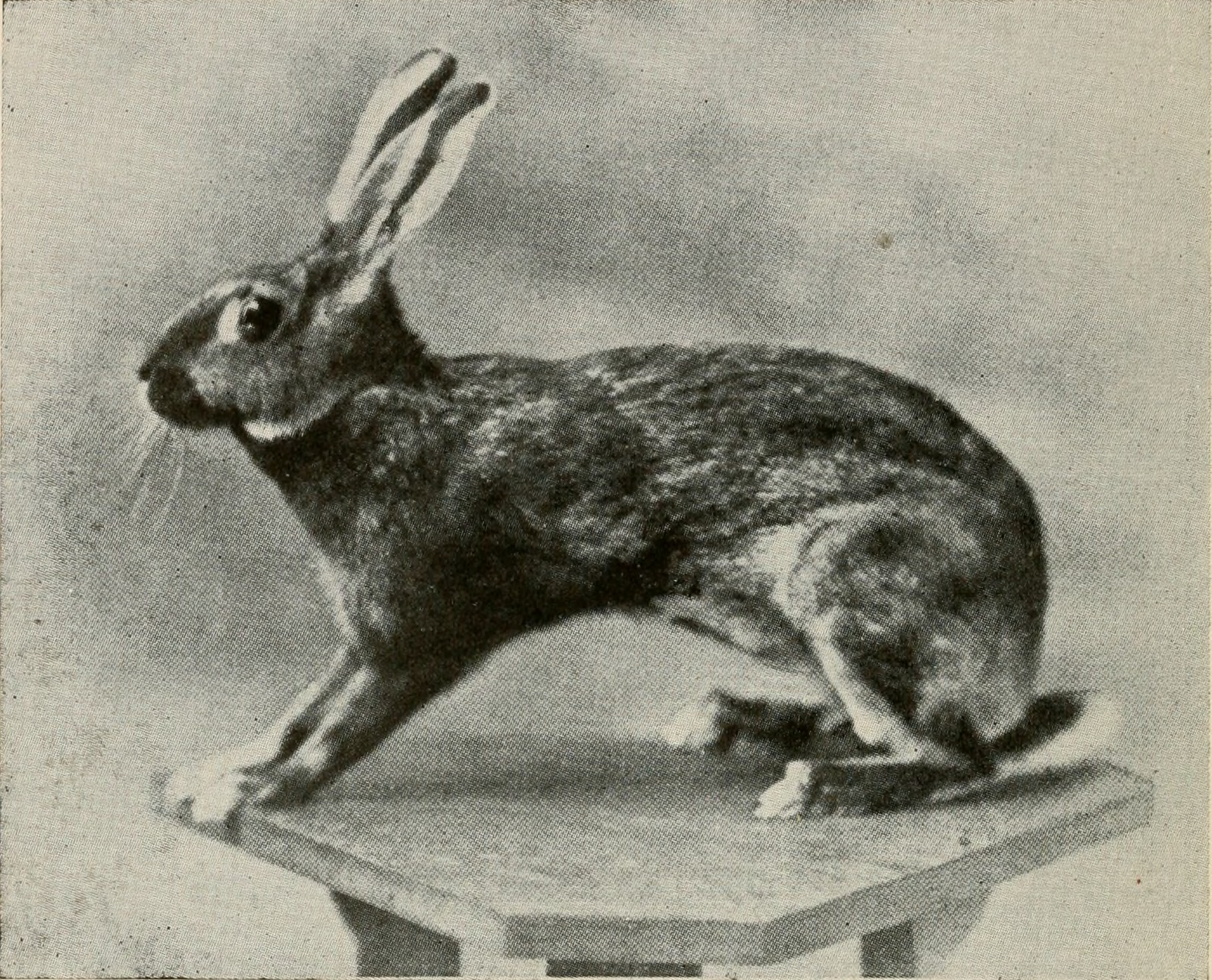
Book illustration from 1915. Caption reads: "The Belgian in the early years of the fancy was a very large rabbit, in color resembling the wild English Hare, having black hairs to produce a 'ticked' effect and ear lacing. The Belgian resembles the wild hare in body, limbs, head and ears; bold, clear, eye; but a color of rich golden tan, broken only by wavy ticking peculiar to no other variety."

The precursors of the Belgian Hare were created in Belgium in the early 18th century, through the crossbreeding of early domestic rabbits with the wild European rabbit. The intent was to create a practical meat rabbit for small livestock. These rabbits were first imported to England in 1874, where they were dubbed the "Belgian Hare". Breeders there made the Belgian Hare more spirited and lithe, like the wild rabbits of England. By 1877 the first Belgian Hares were being shown in America, where the breed immediately rose in popularity. By 1898, the 'Belgian Hare boom' was peaking. One shipping firm in England at the time stated in its annual report: "Over 6,000 Belgian Hares conveyed safely to the United States during 1900." Numerous Belgian Hare clubs were formed across America and countless rabbits were bred. Because the novice breeders were unable to turn the lanky rabbit into a production meat breed, by 1902 the flooded market had gone bust.

The first of these American Belgian Hare clubs was known as the "American Belgian Hare Association", but with a wide and scattered membership, it lasted not much more than a year. The "Boston Belgian Hare Club" was formed in 1880, and in 1897 the "National Belgian Hare Club of America" came into being. Twelve years later, as additional breeds were being introduced and developed in the US, a new "all-breed" club was formed, called the "National Pet Stock Association of America". After several name changes, this became the American Rabbit Breeders Association (ARBA). With the passing of the National Belgian Hare Club many years prior, a dedicated group of breeders applied for a specialty club charter from ARBA, which was granted in July, 1972. The American Belgian Hare Club was born and continues to this day.

The Belgian Hare remains a "fancy" rabbit, with devoted followers in the UK as well as the US, where The Livestock Conservancy lists the breed's conservation status as "threatened".

== Appearance ==
The Belgian Hare is most known for its resemblance to a hare, with a long, fine body with muscular flank, and distinctly arched back with loins and well-rounded hind quarters. Their head is long and their tail straight and carried in line with the backbone. The front feet of a Belgian Hare are long and fine-boned and perfectly straight, while their hind feet are long, fine, and flat. The original Rufus variety features a deep red, rich chestnut color with black ticking. The Tan variety has either Black, Blue, Chocolate or Lilac on the top and sides of the body and reddish-tan belly color. Black Belgian Hares are a solid Black color.

The American Rabbit Breeders Association recognizes both Rufus and Tan varieties. The Tan variety may be shown as Black, Blue, Chocolate or Lilac, all with Rufus undercolor. The British Rabbit Council recognizes Rufus, Tan and solid Black Hares.

== Lifestyle ==
Due to their difference from other breeds of domestic rabbit, the Belgian Hare require different housing requirements than most other rabbits and as a result, may demand more attention and care. Belgian Hares are recommended to be kept on solid floors covered with a bedding material, such as shavings, straw or shredded paper. It is generally recommended that the pen be cleaned weekly and the bedding replaced. Some breeders provide additions to the principal cages called "corrals," or "runs," to provide extra space for the rabbits to exercise in.

Due to their size and energetic nature, Belgian Hare should be provided with an adequately large cage to enable them to move freely. It is recommended that Belgian Hares be provided with large enclosures, at least 4x4 meters.

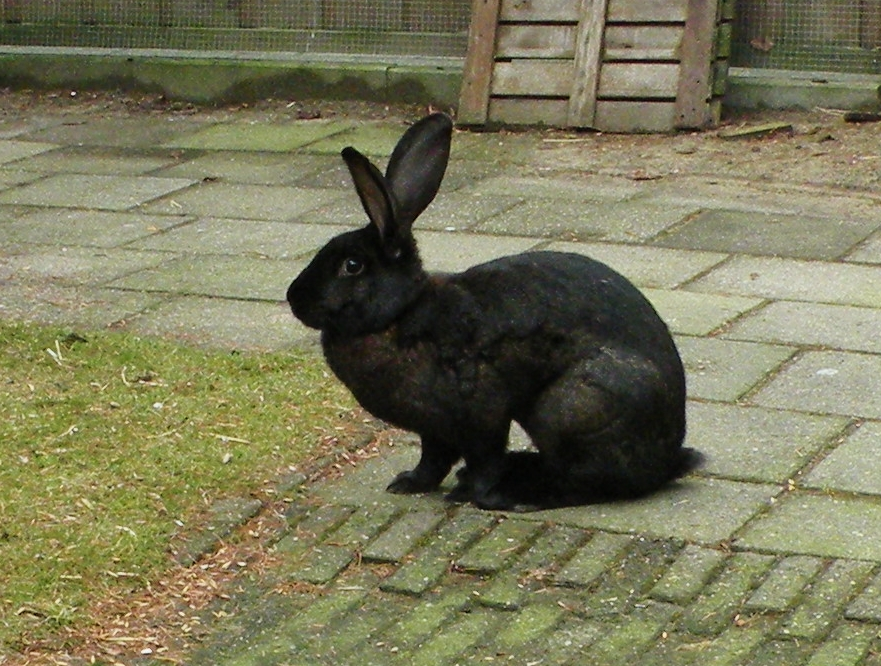
A black Belgian Hare

== Behaviour ==
The Belgian Hare is one of the most intelligent and energetic breeds of rabbit, with the potential to be trained to respond to the sound of their name. Due to their active nature and alert temperament, they can very easily be startled by sudden noise or movement. As a result of their active personality, they have been called "the poor man's racehorse". The Belgian Hare is known to be responsive to handling, particularly when trained from an early age. However, it may not be the best choice for small children due to their large size and speed that could cause injury.

== Diet ==
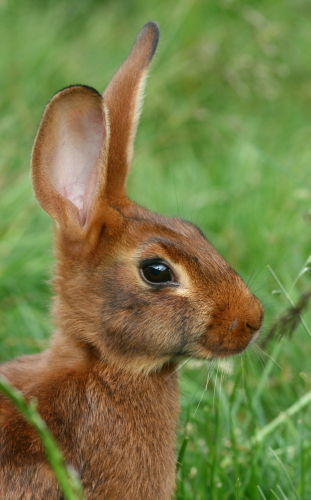
Profile of a Belgian Hare

As the Belgian Hare has a very high metabolic rate, it may require more food and more consistent feeding than other breeds of domestic rabbit. The specific dietary requirements of a Belgian Hare do not differ significantly from other breeds of domestic rabbit. Modern, rabbit-specific pellets provide all the nutritional requirements of rabbits.

== See also ==
- Domestic rabbit
- List of rabbit breeds
