= Cat agility =

Sport for cats

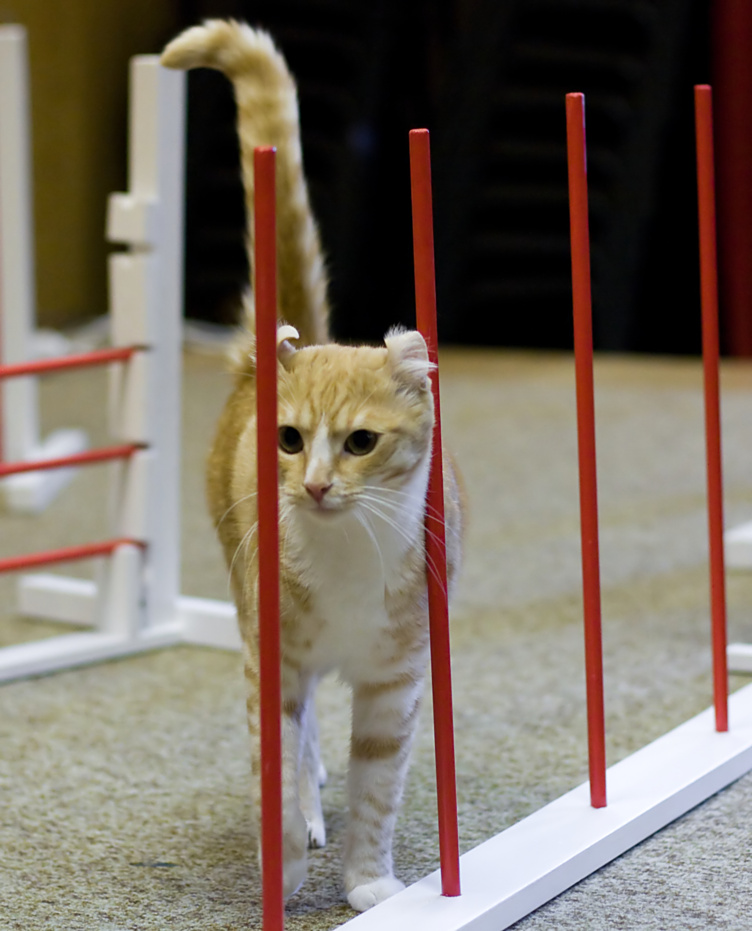
An American Curl performing cat agility.

Cat agility is a sport in which trained cats are lured through timed obstacle courses by their handlers.

Cat agility contests, like similarly themed dog agility contests, are modeled after the equestrian sport of show jumping. Under the rules, cats must complete a course in under 270 seconds, completing each obstacle in a prescribed manner. Lures such as laser pointers and toys on string may be used, but food treats are not allowed. The obstacles are arranged in a circle and include tunnels, steps, and poles. For a typical contest, there are between six and fourteen obstacles, and the winning cats complete the course in about ten seconds.

The first known cat agility contest was held in Albuquerque, New Mexico by Vickie Shields and three friends in 2003. By the late 2000s, the contests were popular worldwide, with approximately 40 held each year in connection with cat shows. In the US, the two largest cat fancy organizations, The Cat Fanciers Association (CFA) and The International Cat Association (TICA), both hold feline agility competitions which have been met with mixed success and popularity. CFA awarded its first National Agility Win in the 2006-07 season, with the top cat in Agility competition being Zehnder's Twyla Mooner of Hitails, a blue Abyssinian female. Twyla was born in 2005 and competed in--and won--her first agility competition as a five-month-old kitten, without ever having any prior training, or practice in, running an obstacle course.
