= Blue imperial =

Blue imperial may refer to:

- Blue Imperial rabbit, a domestic breed, now extinct
- Cinsaut, a wine grape
- Ticherra acte, a butterfly

== See also ==
- Imperial blue (disambiguation)
