= American rabbit =

Breed of rabbit

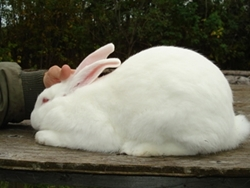
American White Rabbit

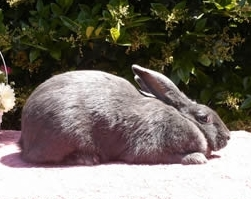
American Blue Rabbit

The American Rabbit is a breed of rabbit, recognized by the American Rabbit Breeders Association (ARBA) in 1917. According to the ARBA Standard of Perfection, American rabbits have a mandolin body shape. It has also been noted for a docile temperament and good mothering abilities. As with all domestic rabbits, the American breed is of the species Oryctolagus cuniculus, the European wild rabbit.

== Name ==
The original name was the German Blue Vienna, but that was quickly changed due to the first World War. In more recent years, rabbit keepers — especially rescue organizations — unfamiliar with the history of rabbit breeding in the US have been referring to mixed breed or "mutt" rabbits as "American". This has led to some confusion over the actual status of this historic breed.

== Color ==
The American Rabbit was originally accepted into the ARBA as a 'Blue' rabbit, and historically has been characterized as having the deepest, darkest fur of all blue or grey rabbits. The color at its best is "uniform rich, dark slate-blue, free from white hairs, sandy or rust color".

A white variety named American White Rabbit was recognized in 1925. It was developed by selecting white sports (mutants), and adding in white red-eyed white (albino) Flemish giants in the bloodline. It is an albino variety of rabbit (otherwise known as red-eyed white) — while blue-eyed whites have appeared, they are considered sports in the American breed and can not be shown. The American may also be black, although it is not a recognized color in the American Rabbit Breeders Association (ARBA).

== Shape ==
The breed standard for American Rabbits calls for a mandolin or semi-arch shape and a long loin, as opposed to the more common 'commercial' or rounded shape typical of quality New Zealand rabbit or Californian rabbit breeds. When shown, this shape calls for a slightly different posing posture than for commercial form rabbits, in order to best display the length of body and modified point of highest arch over the hips.

Americans are a normal, as opposed to dwarf breed of rabbit. An example of a medium-sized rabbit, adult Americans weigh between 4–5.5 kg (8.8–12.1 lb), with does (females) being slightly larger than the bucks (males).

== Breed History ==
The American rabbit was developed in Pasadena, California, by Lewis H. Salisbury. It was recognized in 1918 by the National Breeders and Fanciers Association (the forerunner of the American Rabbit Breeders Association). Some suggest that the American was the first rabbit breed developed in the United States, however, the New Zealand predates the American Blue by several years.

Mr. Salisbury did not disclose what breeds were used to come to this variety. The body shape suggests that it had been bred from blue Vienna, Beveren, Blue Imperial and Flemish Giants. Replication of the development of this breed would be difficult to impossible to accomplish, due to the extinction of the Blue Imperial breed.

The white variety was formally accepted by the ARBA in 1925. It was produced from sports thrown by the American Blues, crossed with White Flemish Giant.

== Conservation status ==
American Rabbits were popular animals up until the 1950s, kept for their fur and meat. As late as 1949, Americans (both Blue and White) were listed among the five or six most popular and most ideal rabbits to raise commercially for meat and fur. Since the development of the commercial rabbit breeds, such as the Californian and New Zealand, and the collapse of the domestic fur market, the Americans have been pretty much ignored by the commercial market. Following a population contraction in the 1980s, they are now among the rarest breeds of rabbits in North America.

In 2005, when rabbit breeds were added to the American Livestock Breed Conservancy, Conservancy Priority List, Americans were listed among the rarest 'Critical' category. The White variety was especially in danger of being dropped from the ARBA's active role in 2004, due to lack of representation at the annual ARBA convention.

Since then, the American Rabbit has undergone a resurgence in population, and in 2012 ALBC shifted the American Rabbit from 'Critical' to the less-endangered 'Threatened' category. Among the significant events leading to the revival of the breed was the dedicated effort of breeders to ship breeding stock across the United States, and the discovery of a line of White American Rabbits among a Hutterite farming community in Alberta, Canada.

Americans are included in the Slow Food USA project under Ark of Taste, Meat and Poultry. This has led to an increased interest in the American Rabbit as a heritage or homestead rabbit breed.

== See also ==
- List of rabbit breeds
