= House Rabbit Society =

American animal rescue organization

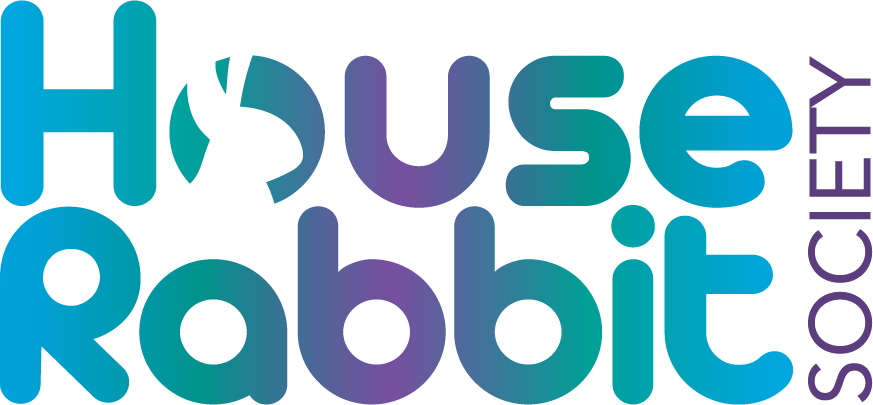
- Formation: 1988
- Type: 501(c)(3)
- Tax ID no.: 94-3061685
- Revenue: $574,999 (2022)
- Expenses: $531,833 (2022)
- Website: houserabbit.org

House Rabbit Society (HRS) is a non-profit organization based in Richmond, California, United States (US), that rescues and adopts rabbits and educates the community with its curriculum on rabbit care. HRS promotes responsible rabbit guardianship, including spaying and neutering, regular veterinary care, diet, and exercise. HRS takes the stand that domestic rabbits should not live outdoors. HRS was granted nonprofit status in 1993.

== Organization philosophy ==
HRS believes that all rabbits are valuable animals, regardless of breed purity, temperament, state of health, or whether a relationship exists with humans—the welfare of domesticated rabbits is the organization's primary consideration. HRS believes that all domestic rabbits should be spayed or neutered and should live in a human adult's home.

== Adoption and education center ==
In the San Francisco Bay Area of the US, HRS runs an adoption and education center, the HRS Rabbit Center—also the location of the HRS home office. Prior to the existence of the HRS Rabbit Center, the daily work of the national organization was undertaken in various private homes throughout the country.

== Adoption and fostering ==
The HRS Rabbit Center rescues rabbits in partnership with municipal shelters across Northern California, particularly in cases where rabbits would be at risk of euthanasia whether due to injury, illness, behavior, or the shelter just having too many rabbits at once. There are typically 80-100 rabbits available for adoption or fostering. The rabbits are transferred to HRS’ care from one of their 35 shelter transfer partners.

After rabbits arrive at the HRS Rabbit Center, their health is evaluated, they are spayed/neutered, provided with medical or surgical care, and then are placed up for adoption. Many rabbits spend a month or more in a foster home, with fosters providing additional information on rabbit’s personalities and behavior, taking photos and video, helping showcase them for adoption.

== Low-Cost Spay/Neuter Services ==
In September 2019, the HRS Rabbit Center opened an in-house surgery suite and started performing surgeries for HRS rabbits after hiring a veterinarian and registered veterinary technician (RVT). House Rabbit Society is the first rabbit rescue in the U.S. to have a staff veterinarian.

In 2023, the HRS Rabbit Center began to offer low-cost spay/neuter services to both the public and other Bay Area rabbit rescues and shelters that have rabbits.

== Low-Cost Vaccination Clinic ==
The HRS Rabbit Center offers a public monthly, low-cost vaccination clinic to vaccinate rabbits against Rabbit Hemorrhagic Disease Virus.

HRS’ education on RHDV2 has been featured in the New York Times.

== Veterinary Training Program ==
In 2023, House Rabbit Society launched a veterinary training initiative aimed at addressing gaps in rabbit-specific medical education.

Rabbit guardians face unique challenges in accessing veterinary care, as comparatively few veterinarians receive formal training in rabbit medicine, a challenge compounded by broader veterinary workforce shortages. As a result, rabbit guardians often report difficulty locating experienced providers, particularly in urgent or emergency situations.

The HRS veterinary training program seeks to improve access to knowledgeable care by providing hands-on training opportunities for veterinarians, registered veterinary technicians (RVTs), veterinary assistants, RVT and veterinary students, and pre-veterinary college students. Under the supervision of the organization’s staff veterinarian and staff RVT, participants receive practical instruction in areas such as safe handling, rabbit-specific anesthesia protocols, and spay and neuter procedures.

Trainees have traveled from across California and other parts of the United States as well as internationally to participate in the program, which the organization states is intended to strengthen veterinary capacity and improve outcomes for domestic rabbits.

== Zoom Classes ==
In response to the COVID-19 pandemic, House Rabbit Society transitioned much of its education programs to an online format, offering live classes via Zoom.

Supported by donor funding, these classes provide rabbit care information to a global audience. Classes cover topics such as basic rabbit care, rabbit behavior, bonding rabbits, senior rabbit care, and multi-species households. Additional offerings include pet loss support groups led by a certified therapist and one-on-one bonding guidance. These classes are open to the public and are not limited to HRS adopters or members.

HRS also occasionally offers on-site, in-person workshops focused on rabbit bonding and basic grooming techniques. The organization states that its goal is to ensure access to accurate and comprehensive information on domestic rabbit care.

== Multilingual Resources ==
House Rabbit Society has developed a range of multilingual educational materials that complement its existing English-language resources. In addition to Spanish, translations in Chinese, Tagalog, and Vietnamese are available for flyers and guidebooks covering rabbit diet, behavior, and general care.

These materials are distributed freely online and through partner shelters and rescues, helping to ensure that language barriers do not impede access to reliable rabbit care information.

== Rabbit Essentials Pantry ==
In November 2022, House Rabbit Society launched a monthly pet food pantry program to provide rabbit food and essential care supplies at no cost to Bay Area residents in need.

In 2025, the organization was awarded a $51,000 grant from Contra Costa County to support the pantry program and to help reduce the cost of spay and neuter services for Contra Costa County residents.

== HRS Hop Shop ==
The Hop Shop at the HRS Rabbit Center sells many rabbit supplies, such as food, toys, and treats, that can be purchased on site in-person or picked up curbside. Nationwide shipping is also available.

== Other Public Services ==
HRS also offers grooming appointments and boarding by appointment.

== Grantmaking ==
Since 2016, House Rabbit Society has awarded over $105,882 in grants to House Rabbit Society chapters and emergency grants to non-chapter 5013 nonprofits. In 2022, a separate HRS grant program awarded $28,825 in funding to 12 US-based HRS chapters that requested funding, to support RHDV2 vaccination programs for chapter foster rabbits. In 2023, HRS awarded over $16,000 in emergency grants to both HRS chapters and other nonprofits.

== Magazine ==
House Rabbit Society publishes the House Rabbit Journal, an annual full-color magazine that includes information about rabbit care, heartwarming stories from members, and updates about the organization’s activities. The magazine is distributed free of charge to members and is also available to read online. The House Rabbit Journal has been continuously published since the organization was founded in 1988.
