= Hutch (animal cage) =

Type of cage utilized primarily for housing domestic rabbits

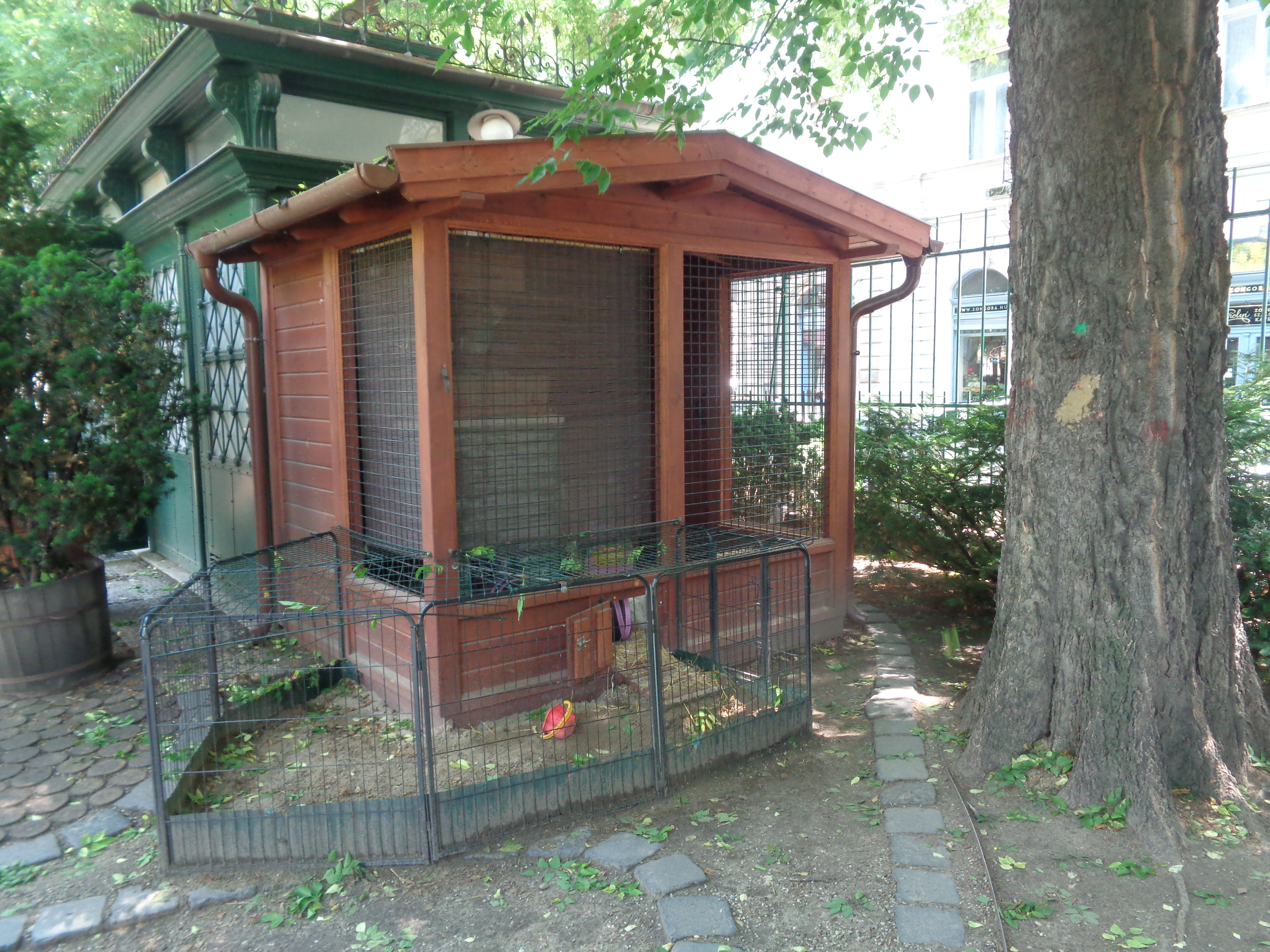
Rabbit hutch

A hutch is a type of cage used typically for housing domestic rabbits. Other small animals can also be housed in hutches such as guinea pigs, ferrets, and hamsters.

== Background ==
Most hutches have a frame constructed of wood, including legs to keep the unit off the ground. The floor may be wood, wire mesh, or some combination of the two. Wire mesh (1" x 1/2") is suitable for rabbits. One or more walls of the hutch are also wire mesh to allow for ventilation. Some hutches have built-in nest boxes and shingled roofs—these are generally intended to be placed directly outside rather than inside another shelter such as a barn. Some hutches have a felt roof. In any case it is important that the hutch is draft-free and provides a shelter in case the animal is scared and wants to retreat to a safe haven. Not only will this help protect your pet from harsh weather conditions, but also predator attacks.

The generally accepted minimum hutch size is 4 square feet for a 4 kg medium-sized breed. If the animal is very protective or even aggressive, this is generally a sign that the hutch is too small.

== See also ==
- Calf hutch, enclosure for dairy calves
