= Vienna rabbit =

Breed of domestic rabbit

Vienna Rabbit
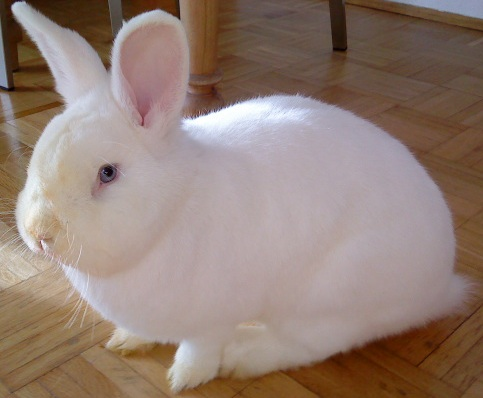
- A white Vienna Rabbit
- Country of origin: Austria
- Distribution: Europe
- Use: Pet

Traits
- Weight: 3.5–5.25 kg (7 lb 11 oz – 11 lb 9 oz)
- Color: White, blue, black or Agouti
- Lifespan: 8-10 years

The Vienna rabbit is a breed of domesticated rabbit originating in Austria. Whilst it is recognised by the British Rabbit Council as a "Normal Fur" breed, it is unrecognised by the American Rabbit Breeders Association.

== Origin ==
The Vienna rabbit was originally bred by Wilheim Mucke in the late 1800s, who spent 15 years attempting to breed a rabbit with blue eyes. It has since become one of the most popular breeds in Europe.

== Appearance ==
The Vienna rabbit can come in two varieties: a uniform white, or coloured. The coloured variety can be a dark slate blue, black or Agouti (a chestnut brown). It has ears approximately 13 centimetres (5.1 in) in length.

== Diet ==
Like most other rabbits, this breed should be fed a mainly fibre-rich diet, consisting mainly of vegetables and timothy hay.

== Health ==
The Vienna rabbit can suffer from overgrown teeth, ear mites and hairballs. It can be susceptible to digestive issues such as GI stasis which may cause intestinal blockage, or in severe cases, death.

== Behaviour ==
The Vienna Rabbit is a docile breed. They are able to be litter trained with patience and persistence.
