= Imperial blue (disambiguation) =

Imperial blue is a shade of blue.

Imperial blue may also refer to:

== Butterflies ==
- Charaxes imperialis in the family Lycaenidae
- Jalmenus evagoras in the family Nymphalidae

== Other uses ==
- Imperial Blue (film)
- Imperial Blue (whisky)
- Blue Imperial rabbit, a domestic breed now extinct

== See also ==
- Blue imperial (disambiguation)
