= Mabel Illingworth =

British rabbit breeder (1879–1955)

Mabel Illingworth (1879–1955) was a rabbit breeder credited with the creation of the Lilac and Blue Imperial breeds. She is credited as the first woman to create a rabbit breed. In addition to developing of these breeds, Mabel contributed to the growth of rabbit fancy in the United States through the export of Lilac, Blue Imperial and Havana rabbits there.

She contributed a specimen of the Blue Imperial rabbit breed to the Natural History Museum, London in 1905. As she continued work with the Blue Imperial rabbits in the 1910s, she created one of the three British rabbit breeds that would come to be known as the Lilac rabbit after their intermixing. Her breed, created in 1913 through crossing Blue Imperial and Havana rabbits, was known as the Essex Lavender.
