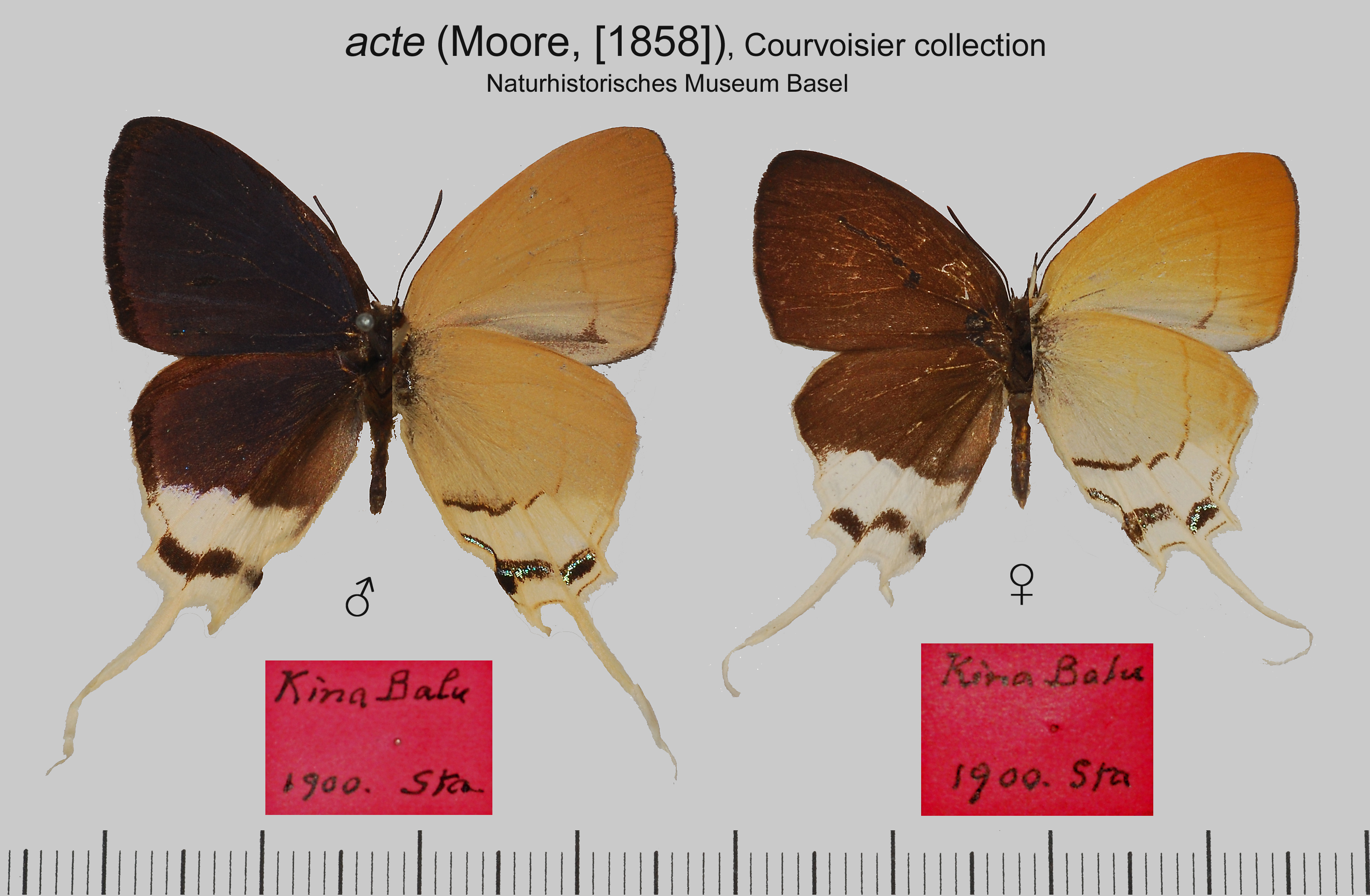
- From the Courvoisier Collection, Basel

Scientific classification
- Kingdom: Animalia
- Phylum: Arthropoda
- Class: Insecta
- Order: Lepidoptera
- Family: Lycaenidae
- Genus: Ticherra
- Species: T. acte

Binomial name
- Ticherra acte (Moore, 1857)

Synonyms
- Myrina acte Moore, [1858]; Myrina symira Hewitson, 1876; Ticherra acte acte f. idina Fruhstorfer, 1912; Biduanda staudingeri Druce, 1895

= Ticherra =

Blue imperial

Monotypic butterfly genus in family Lycaenidae

Ticherra is a monotypic genus in the lycaenid or blues family. Its sole species is Ticherra acte, the blue imperial, a small butterfly found in India and South-East Asia.

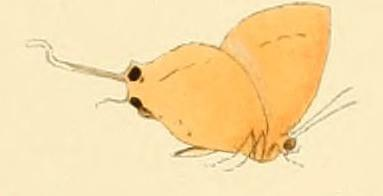

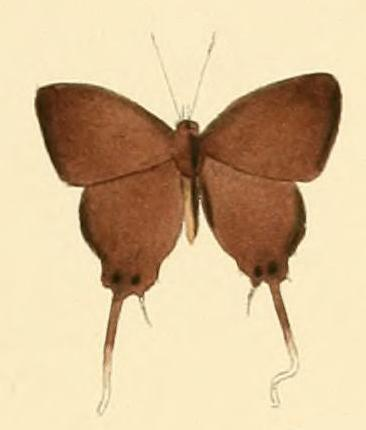

== Subspecies ==
- Ticherra acte acte (Sikkim, Assam, Burma, Thailand, Cambodia)
- Ticherra acte liviana Fruhstorfer, 1912 (southern Burma, Peninsular Malaya, Thailand, Sumatra)
- Ticherra acte staudingeri (Druce, 1895) (Borneo)
- Ticherra acte retracta Cowan, 1967 (Hainan)

== See also ==
- List of butterflies of India (Lycaenidae)
