= Blue Imperial rabbit =

Extinct breed of domestic rabbit

The Blue Imperial rabbit was an English breed of domestic rabbit that is now extinct. It was originally bred by Mabel Illingworth (1879-1955), who was the first woman to create a rabbit breed. It was used to create several modern breeds, including the American rabbit.

== Name ==
The proper name for the breed was the "Blue Imperial". It was sometimes interchangeably called "Imperial Blue", or even shortened to "Imperial", in the United States, but this is contrary to the original name.

== History ==
Beginning in 1896, Mabel Illingworth began the process of creating the Blue Imperial. The inspiration for the breed came from the blue-colored cats her mother raised. For many years, Miss Illingworth was secretive about the origins of her breed, but she finally divulged her method in the mid-1920s. She first bred a Blue and a Tortoiseshell English Lop, then bred the resulting litter to a White Angora. This was an old method of revealing what dominant color the rabbits had behind them. In the second generation, self-blues appeared with long, but erect ears. These were bred to a heavily marked blue-fawn Dutch buck, as well as a self-blue Dutch buck. Other breedings improved the color. Illingworth first exhibited the rabbits at a rabbit show at the Crystal Palace in London in 1903.

A doe appeared in the second year of experimentation that featured ideal type and color according to Illingworth's specifications. It was named "Blue Pussie" after Illingworth's mother's cats that had inspired the breed. This rabbit was used extensively in the breeding program to fix the desired traits. The breed was shipped to America before 1915 and recognized by the National Pet Stock Association (the forerunner of the National Breeders and Fanciers Association of America which itself became the American Rabbit Breeders Association). Blue Imperials were rare and never popular in America; they disappeared from standards by 1934 and became extinct there and in England shortly thereafter.

== Appearance ==
The breed came in only one standard variety; Blue. The Blue Imperial was described in the 1920 Standard of Perfection for the National Breeders and Fanciers Association of America (which became the American Rabbit Breeders Association). The color is described as follows: "the color of the Blue Imperial should be an even shade of dark blue throughout, fur soft and bright, and a trifle longer than the other short haired rabbits." The breed was about seven pounds in weight.

== Contributions to other breeds ==
In 1913, Mabel Illingworth crossed her newly developed breed with Havanas to produce a Lilac rabbit she dubbed the Essex Lavenders. These become the second of the three British strains that were used to create the Lilac breed. Blue Imperials are believed to have been used in the creation of the American rabbit.
