= Rabbit show =

Competitive exhibition of rabbits

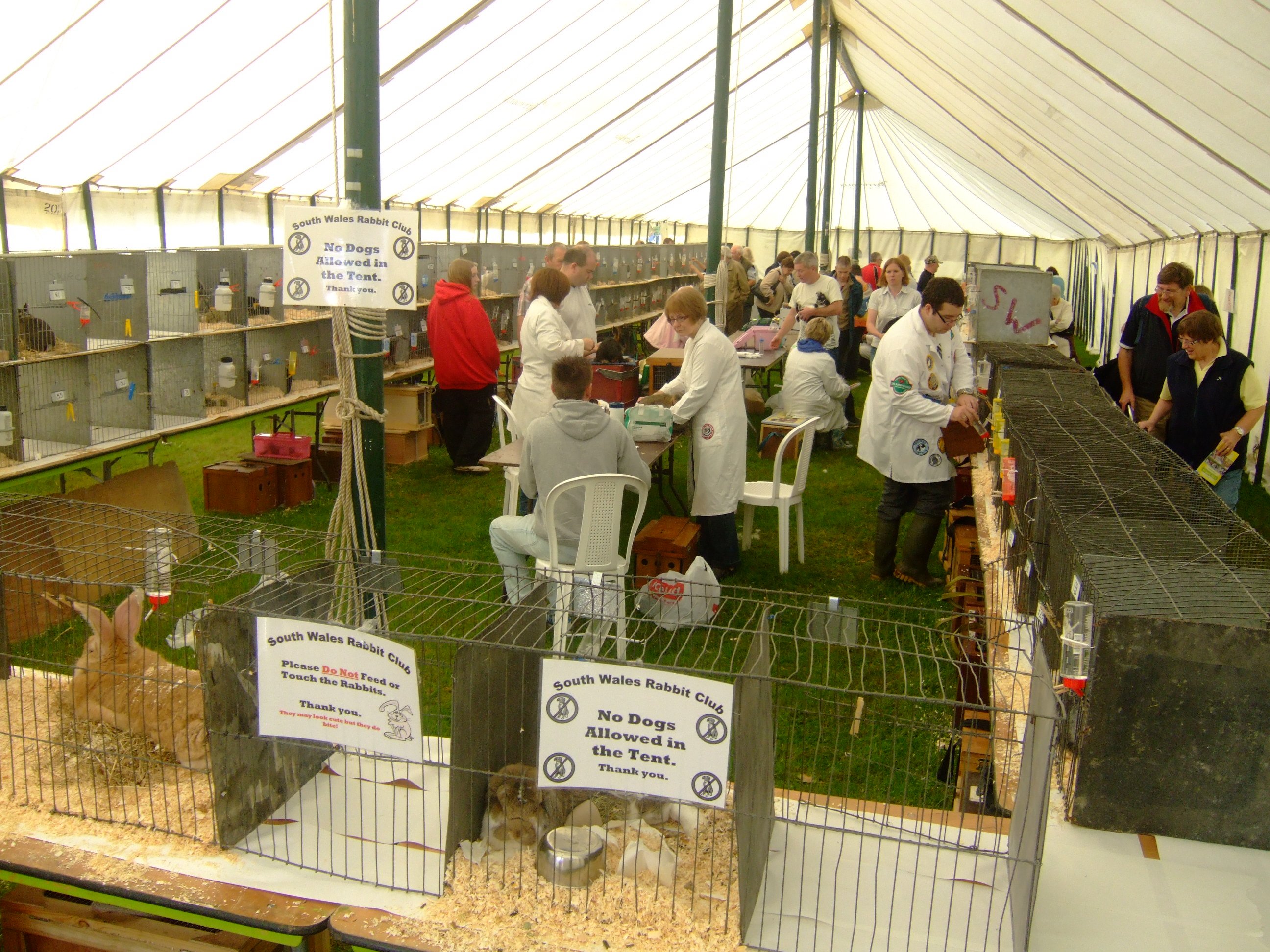
A rabbit show preparation area in Llantrisant Fawr, Monmouthshire, Wales

A rabbit show is a type of animal show where rabbits are exhibited. Most rabbit exhibitions in America are sanctioned by the American Rabbit Breeders Association (ARBA), which recognizes 53 breeds in its Standard of Perfection 2026–2030. Rabbit show jumping, also known as rabbit hopping or rabbit agility, is a performance sport developed in the 1970s based on horse jumping and is distinct from traditional rabbit shows. Rabbit shows are mainly oriented towards exhibitors, rather than spectators, and receive little publicity compared to rabbit show jumping. Exhibitors display rabbits at shows for prize money and other awards.

== History ==
Rabbit shows are associated largely with the ARBA, originally founded in 1910 as the National Pet Stock Association, but various breeds have been raised for exhibition throughout the 19th century, starting in England with the formation of the first rabbit club in 1840.

== Criteria ==
Rabbit shows involve the judging of rabbits based on several criteria, which are set based on a breed standard. Shows sanctioned by the ARBA are judged based on the Standard of Perfection. These criteria are specific to the breed of rabbit being shown, and shown rabbits in a breed are further divided into judging classes by their variety, age, and sex. In addition to any particular characteristics of a breed, shown rabbits are judged based on the following criteria:

- Rabbit handling
- Rabbit posing on the show table
- Examination of the rabbit
- Condition of rabbit, including that of:
  - Fitting
  - Flesh
  - Fur
  - General health

As part of the process, exhibitors themselves may be judged on their appearance and their own rabbit knowledge through a quiz.
