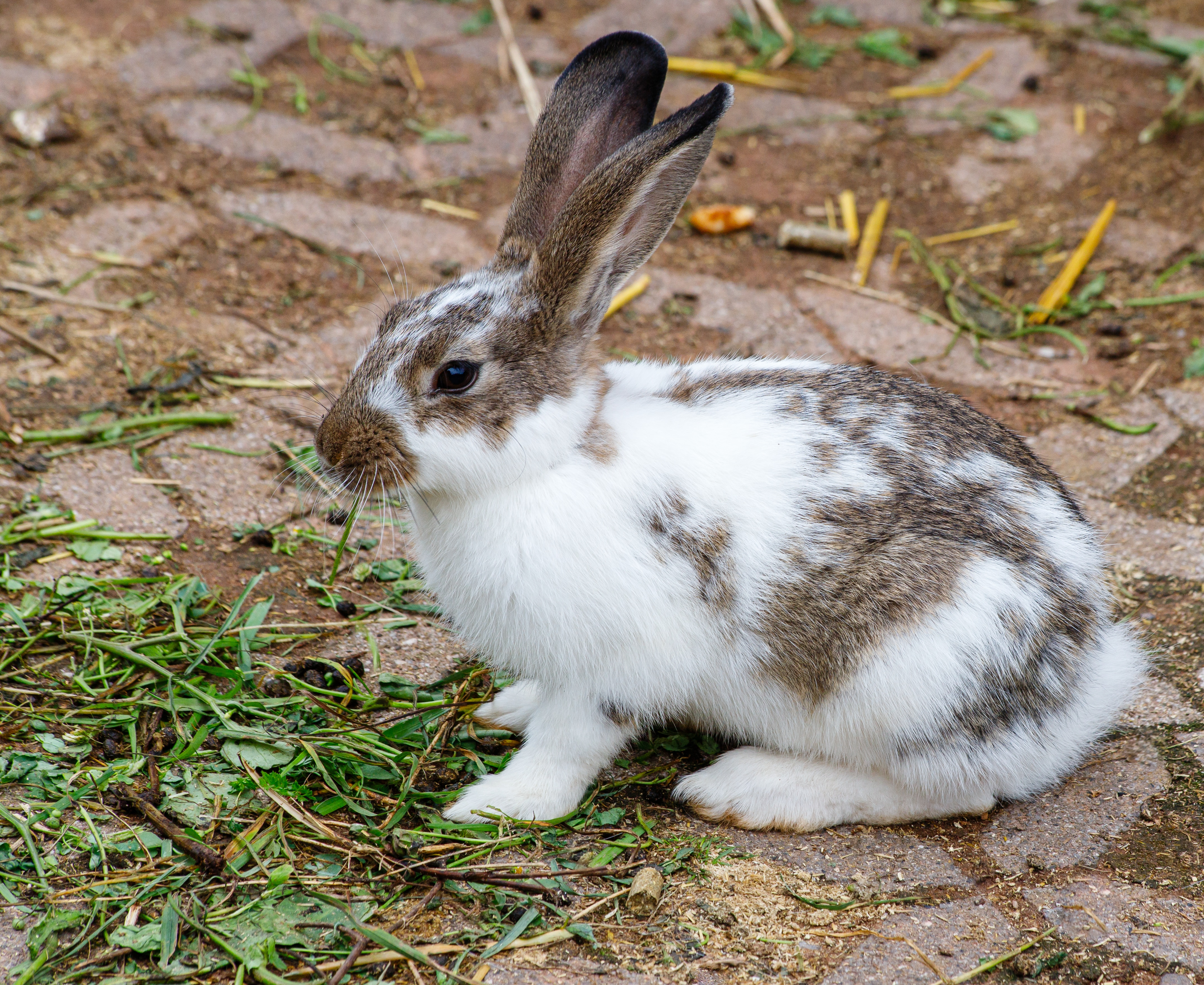
- Silz, Rhineland-Palatinate, Germany
- The calls of a pet rabbit

Conservation status
- Domesticated

Scientific classification
- Kingdom: Animalia
- Phylum: Chordata
- Class: Mammalia
- Order: Lagomorpha
- Family: Leporidae
- Genus: Oryctolagus
- Species: O. cuniculus
- Subspecies: O. c. domesticus

Trinomial name
- Oryctolagus cuniculus domesticus

= Domestic rabbit =

Domesticated form of European rabbit

The domestic rabbit (Oryctolagus cuniculus domesticus) is the domesticated form and subspecies of the European rabbit. There are hundreds of rabbit breeds originating from all over the world. Rabbits were first domesticated and used for food and fur by the Romans. Rabbits may be housed inside, but the idea of the domestic rabbit as a house companion, a so-called house rabbit (similar to a house cat), was only strongly promoted starting with publications in the 1980s. Rabbits can be trained to use a litter box and taught to come when called, but require exercise and can damage a house or injure themselves if it has not been suitably prepared, based on their innate need to chew. Accidental interactions between pet rabbits and wild rabbits, while seemingly harmless, have been strongly discouraged due to the species' different temperaments as well as wild rabbits potentially carrying diseases.

Unwanted pet rabbits sometimes end up in animal shelters, especially after the Easter season. In 2017, they were the United States' third most abandoned pet. Some of them go on to be adopted and become family pets in various forms. Because their wild counterparts have become invasive in Australia, pet rabbits are banned in the state of Queensland and the Northern Territory. Domestic rabbits bred for generations under human supervision to be docile will be less able to care or fend for themselves, if they are abandoned or escape from captivity.

Domestic rabbits are raised as livestock for their meat, wool (in the case of the Angora breeds) and/or fur. They are also kept as pets and used as laboratory animals. Specific breeds are used in different industries; Rex rabbits, for example, are commonly raised for their fur, Californians are commonly raised for meat and New Zealands are commonly used in animal testing for their nearly identical appearance. Aside from the commercial or pet application, rabbits are commonly raised for exhibition at shows.

Rabbits are popular companion animals, but they are sensitive to their living conditions and require dedicated care and attention. In particular, they require an appropriate diet consisting primarily of feeding hay, supplemented with moderate amounts of vegetables and pellets, as well as a large, clean living enclosure equipped with enrichment items and hiding places. Veterinary professionals have raised concerns about whether these requirements are adequately met, as many rabbit owners do not provide an appropriate diet or a sufficiently large and safe living enclosure.

== Terminology and etymology ==
Male rabbits are called bucks; females are called does. An older term for an adult rabbit is coney, while rabbit once referred only to the young animals. Another term for a young rabbit is bunny, though this term is often applied informally (especially by children and rabbit enthusiasts) to rabbits generally, especially domestic ones. More recently, the term kit or kitten has been used to refer to a young rabbit. A young hare is called a leveret; this term is sometimes informally applied to a young rabbit as well. A group of rabbits is known as a "colony" or a "nest".

The word rabbit itself derives from the Middle English rabet, a borrowing from the Walloon robète, which was a diminutive of the French or Middle Dutch robbe.

== History ==
The spread of the European rabbit from its native range of the Iberian Peninsula is linked to the possible deliberate introduction of the species to Africa by the Phoenicians around this time period, followed by later introductions to the regions of Italy, England, and Ireland by various seafaring groups.

The captivity of rabbits as a food source is recorded as early as the 1st century BC, when the Roman writer Pliny the Elder described the use of rabbit hutches, along with enclosures called leporaria. In Rome, rabbits were raised in large walled colonies with walls extended underground. According to Pliny, the consumption of unborn and newborn rabbits, called laurices, was considered a delicacy.

In the Middle Ages, wild rabbits were often kept for the hunt. Monks in southern France were crossbreeding rabbits at least by the 12th century AD. This was thought to have occurred as early as 600 AD in order to provide a 'meat substitute' for the monks during lent, which is a Christian observance in which one must refrain from eating meat. Domestication was probably a slow process that took place from the Roman period (or earlier) until the 1500s, around which point rabbit was a meat served as a luxury.

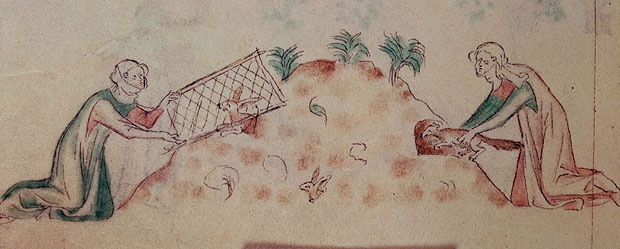
A medieval depiction of ladies who are hunting rabbits in a warren using cages and ferrets. Queen Mary's Psalter (1340)

In the 19th century, as animal fancy in general began to emerge, rabbit fanciers began to sponsor rabbit exhibitions and fairs in Western Europe and the United States. Breeds of various domesticated animals were created and modified for the added purpose of exhibition, a departure from the breeds that had been created solely for food, fur, or wool. The rabbit's emergence as a household pet began during the Victorian era. The keeping of the rabbit as a pet commencing from the 1800s coincides with the first observable skeletal differences between the wild and domestic populations, even though captive rabbits had been exploited for over 2,000 years.

The emerging domestic rabbit subspecies, all breeds of which have been derived from the European rabbit (Oryctolagus cuniculus), has been popular in the United States since the late 19th century. What became known as the "Belgian Hare Boom" began with the importation of the first Belgian Hares from England in 1888 and, soon after, the founding of the American Belgian Hare Association, the first rabbit club in America. From 1898 to 1901, many thousands of Belgian Hares were imported to America. Today, the Belgian Hare is one of the rarest breeds, with only 132 specimens found in the United States in a 2015 census.

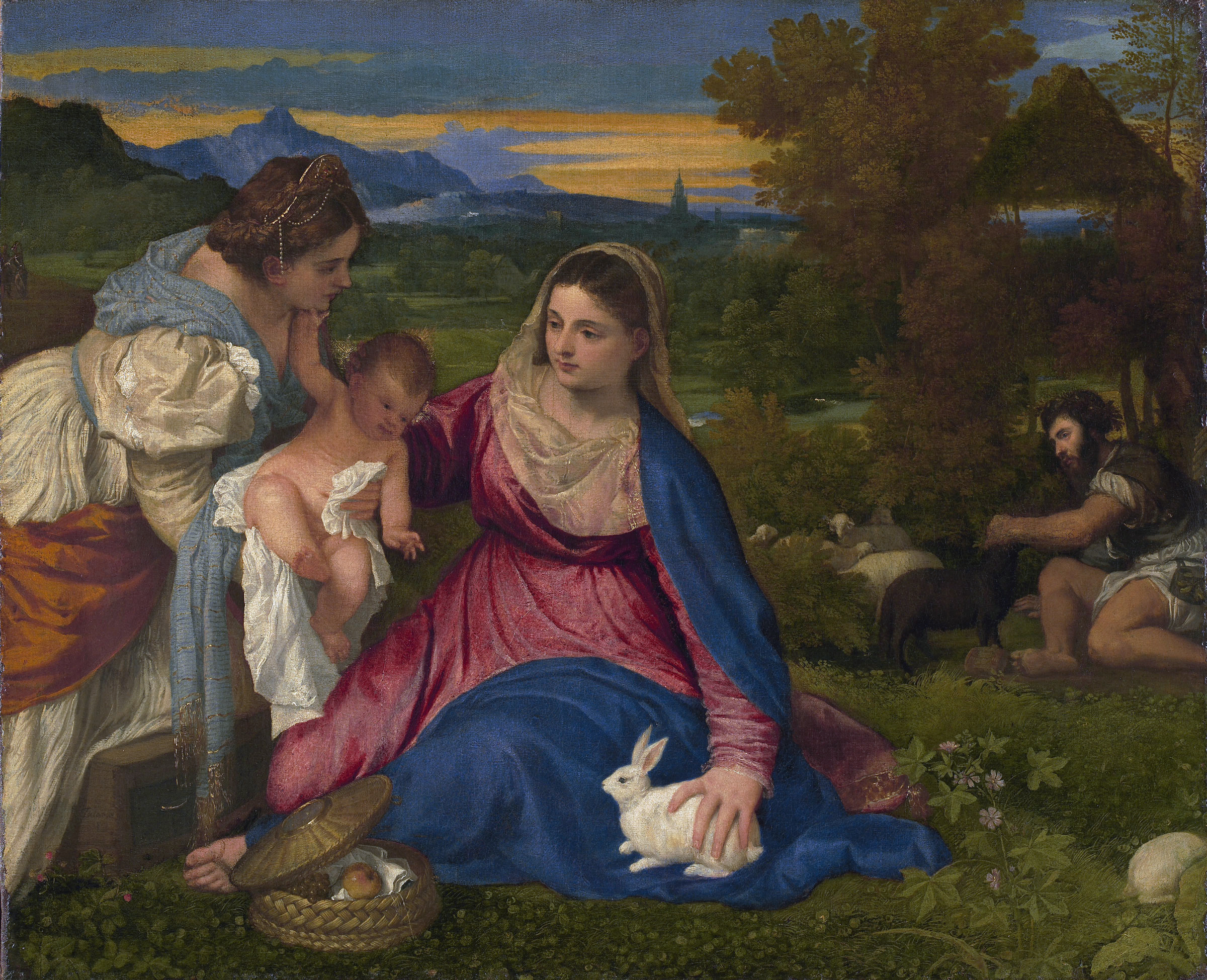
Titian, Madonna of the Rabbit (c. 1530)

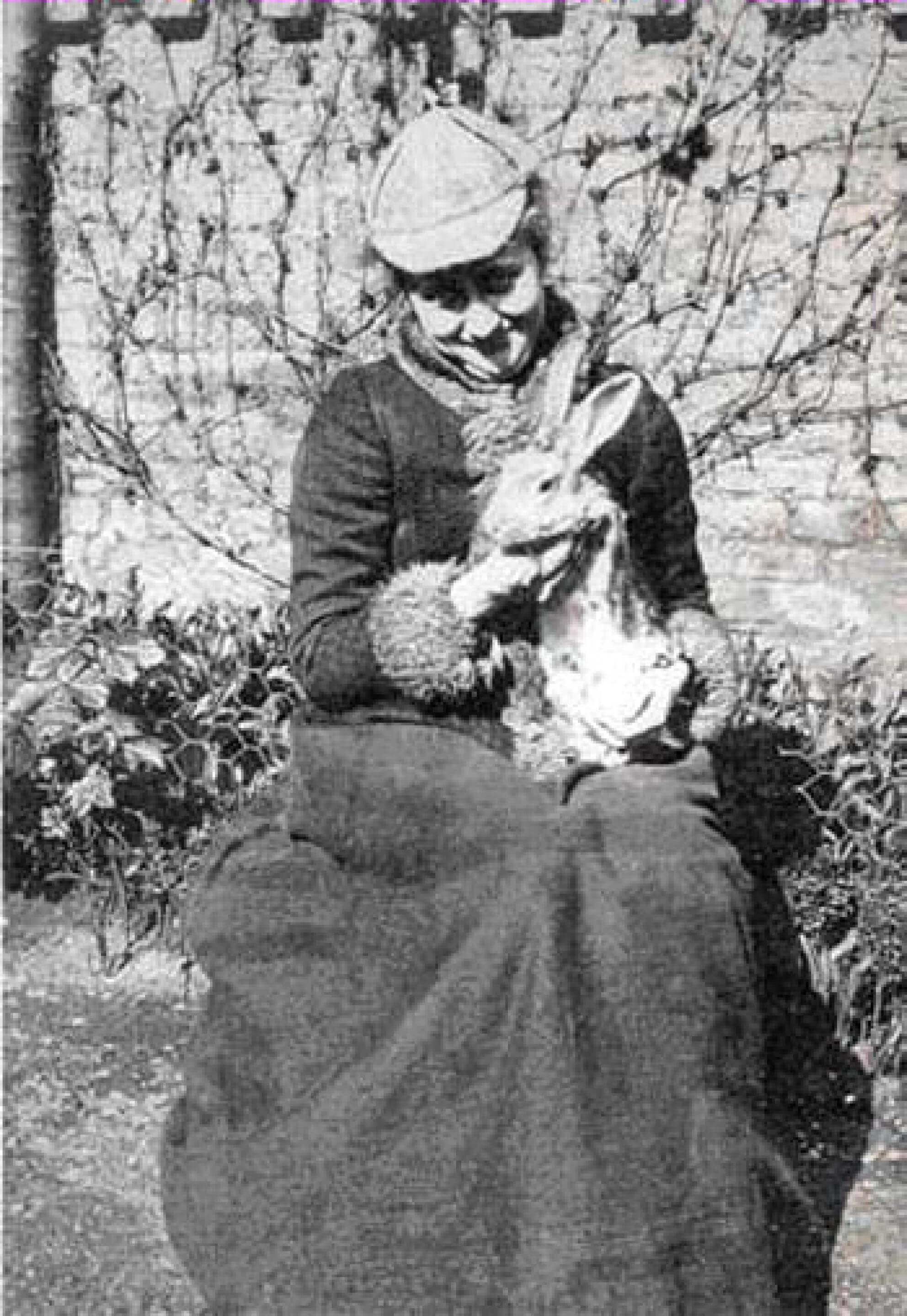
Beatrix Potter and one of her rabbits

Rabbits as house companions began appearing with frequency in the late 19th century. The most notable documentation is from Beatrix Potter's published diaries and letters. Potter allowed both rabbits to live at least part time in the house with her. "Both were fond of the fire, and one used to lie inside the fender", and one rabbit slept, "under the grate on the hot ashes when the fire had gone out." The publication of Marinell Harriman's House Rabbit Handbook: How to Live with an Urban Rabbit in 1985 was another significant push towards the popularisation of rabbits as indoor pets.

== Biology ==
=== Genetics ===
The study of rabbit genetics is of interest to fanciers, the fibre and fur industry, medical researchers, and the meat industry. Among rabbit fanciers, the genetics of rabbit health and diversity are paramount. The fibre & fur industry focuses on the genetics of coat colour and hair properties. In the biomedical research community and the pharmaceutical industry, rabbit genetics are important in model organism research, in vitro fertilisation, and toxicity testing. The meat industry mainly relies on genetics for feed conversion ratios and reproduction potential in rabbits.

The rabbit genome has been sequenced and is publicly available. The mitochondrial DNA has also been sequenced. In 2011, parts of the rabbit genome were re-sequenced in greater depth in order to expose variation within the genome.

Rabbit coat pattern & colour genes

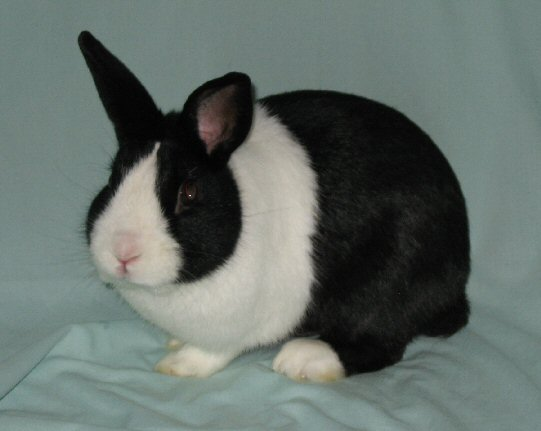
Gene = du
Pattern: Dutch
Gene = B
Color: Black (on white)

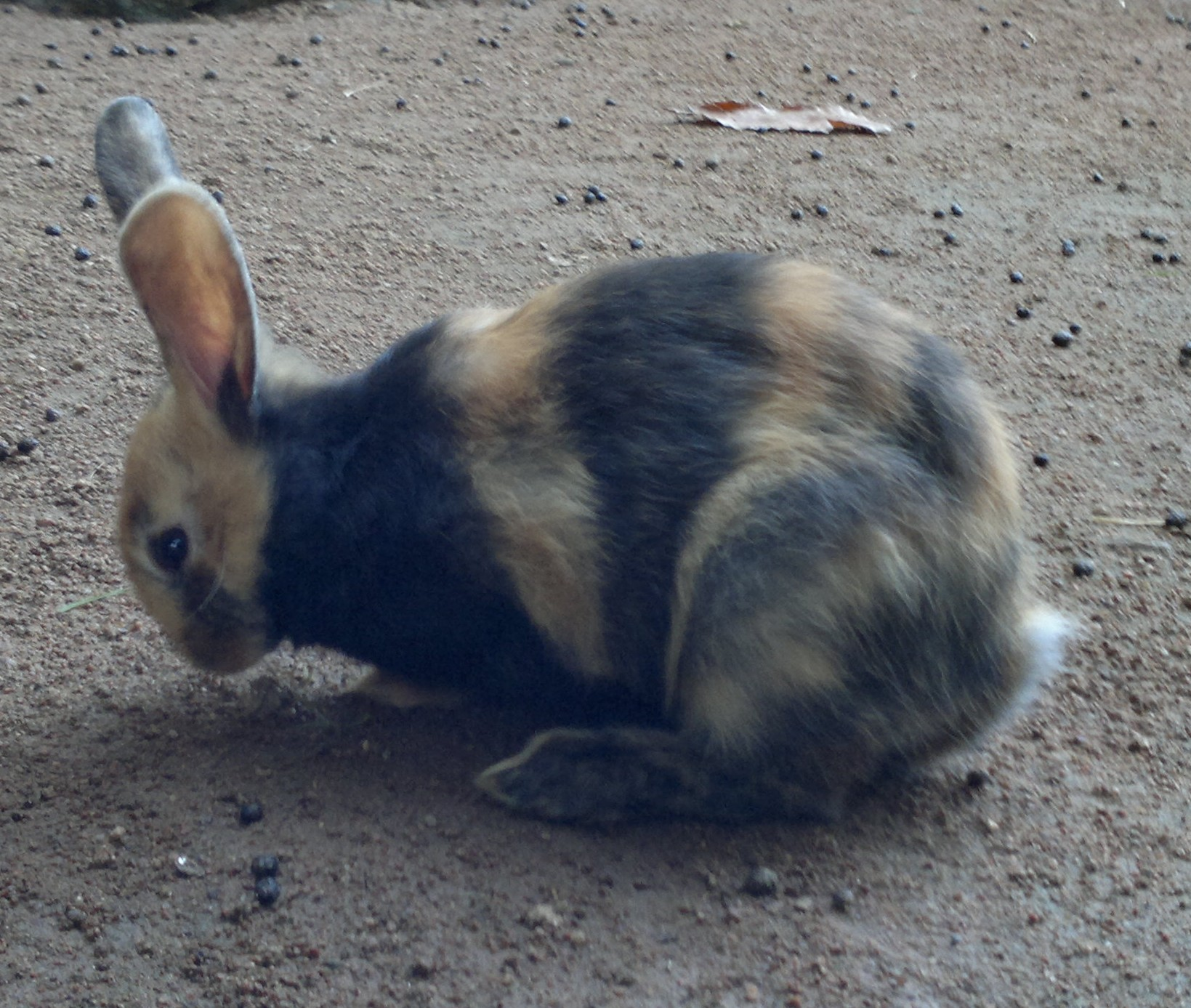
Gene = e(j)
Pattern: Harlequin

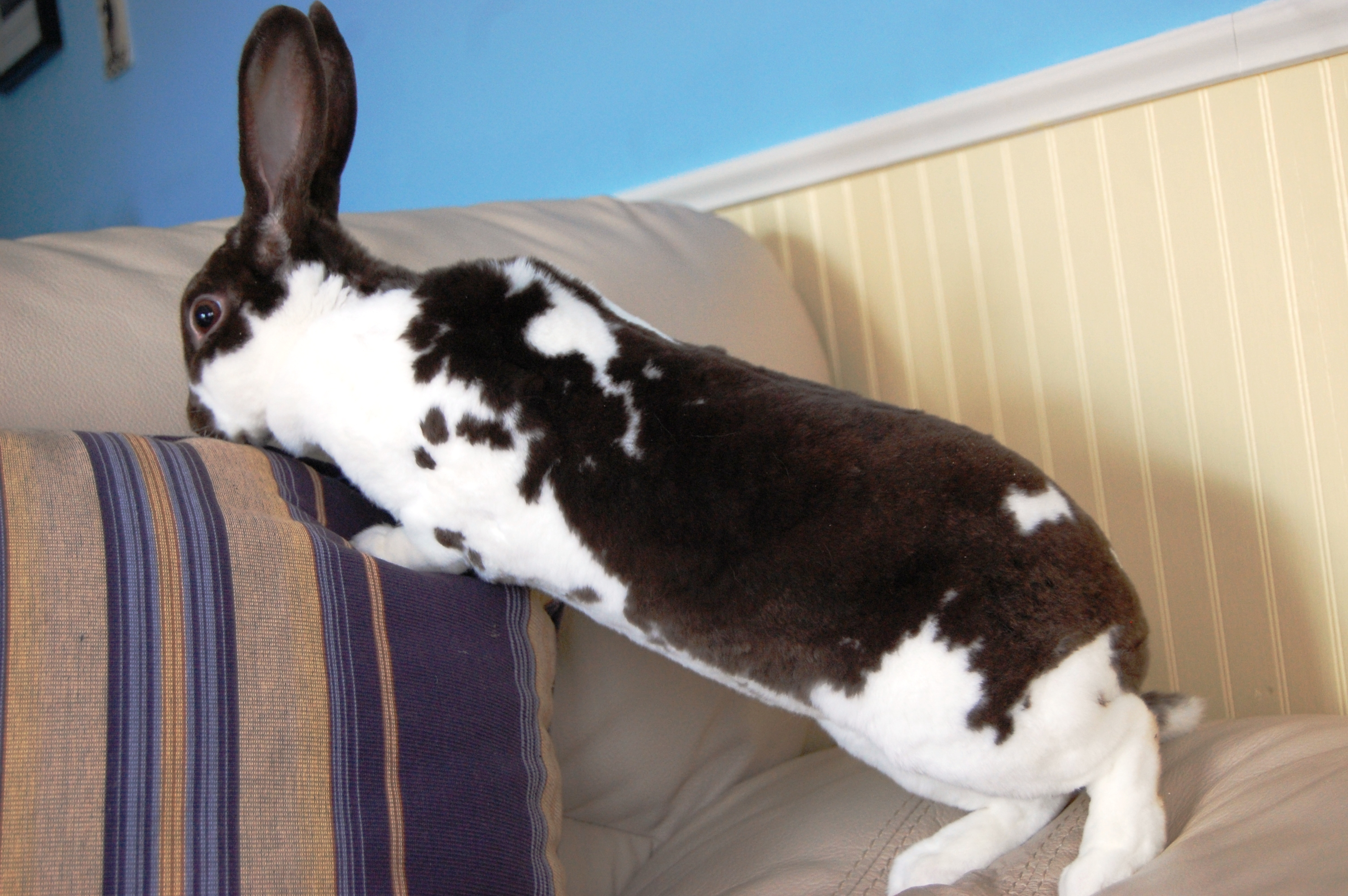
Gene = Enen
Pattern: Broken
Gene = D
Color: Chocolate (on white)

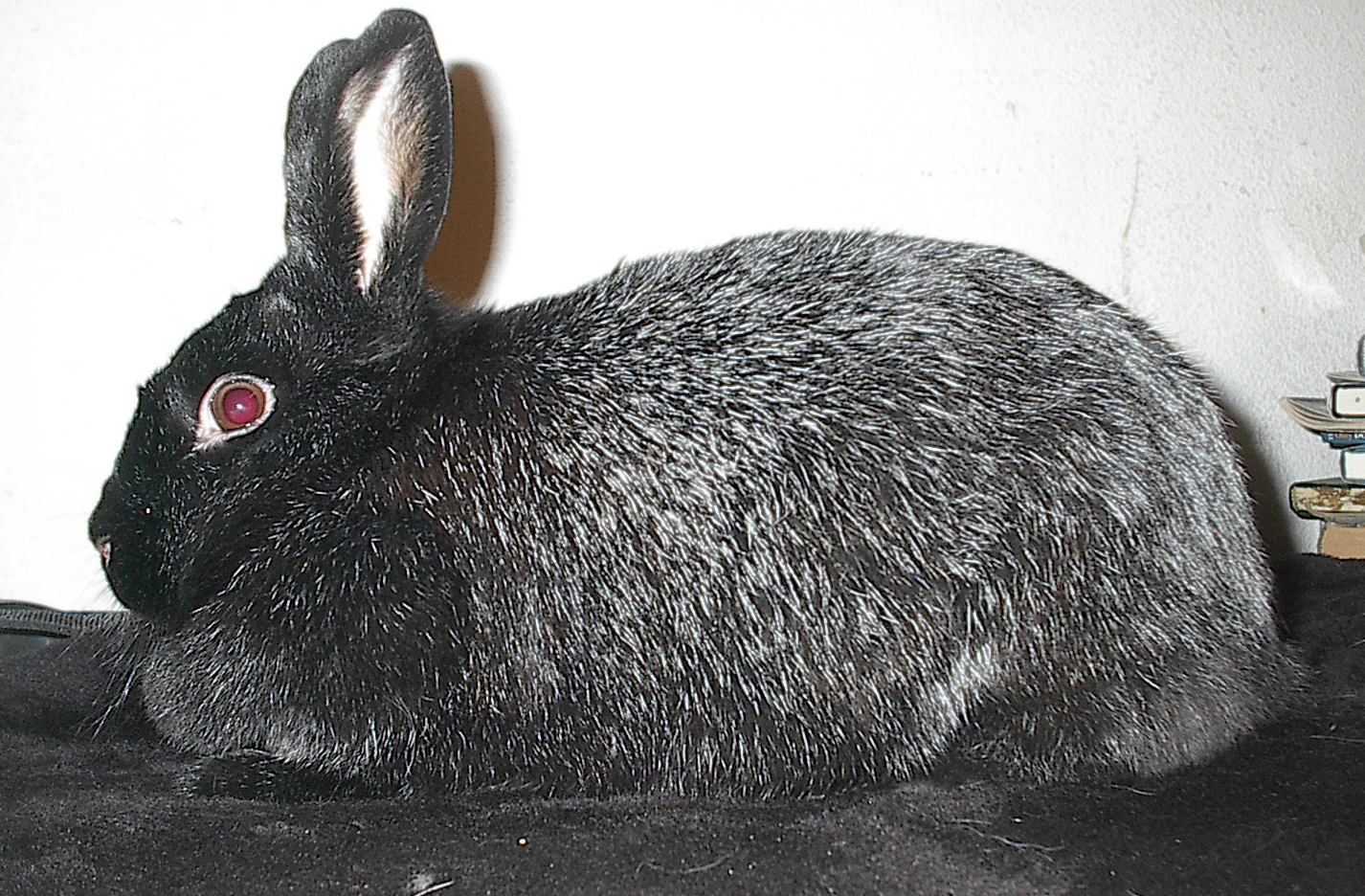
Gene = si
Silvering of the hair shaft

There are 7 main colour gene groups (or loci) in rabbits, with an additional 4 uncommon loci that are often breed specific; many other genes exist that influence coat colour to a lesser degree. A rabbit's coat has either two pigments (pheomelanin for yellow, and eumelanin for dark brown) or no pigment (for an albino rabbit). Clusters of colour genes plus their modifiers control such aspects as coat patterns (e.g. Dutch or English markings), colour hues and their intensity or dilution, and the location of colour bands on the hair shaft (e.g., silvering).

=== Diet ===
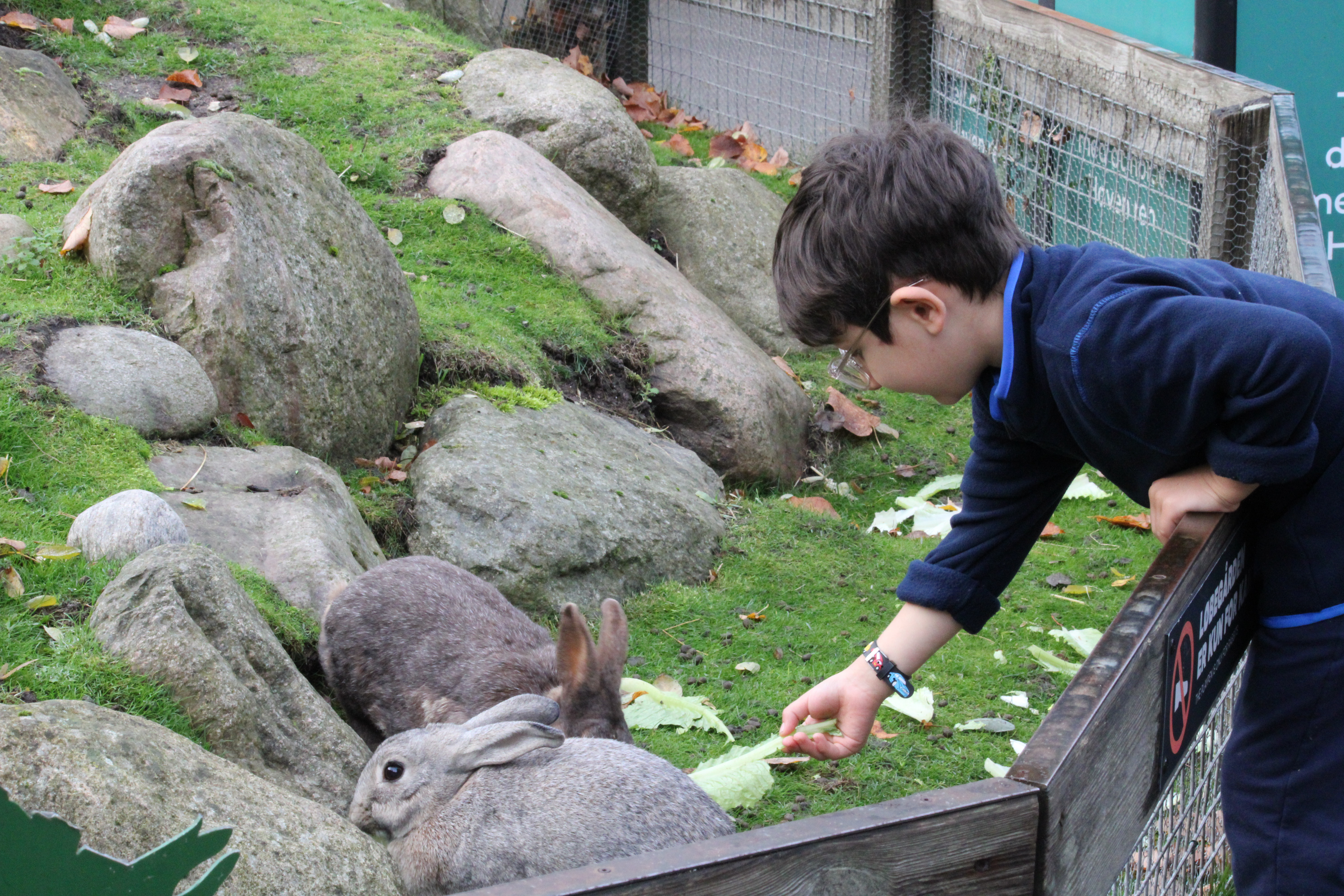
A boy feeding rabbits at the Copenhagen Zoo

As a refinement of the diet of the wild rabbit, the diet of the domestic rabbit is often a function of its purpose. Show rabbits are fed for vibrant health, strong musculoskeletal systems, and—like rabbits intended for the fur trade—optimal coat production and condition. Rabbits intended for the meat trade are fed for swift and efficient production of flesh, while rabbits in research settings have closely controlled diets for specific goals. Nutritional needs of the domestic rabbit may also be focused on developing a physique that allows for the safe delivery of larger litters of healthy kits. Optimizing costs and producing feces that meet local waste regulations may also be factors.

Hay is an essential part of the diet of all rabbits and it is a major component of the commercial food pellets that are formulated for domestic rabbits and available in many areas. Most rabbit pellets are alfalfa-based for protein and fibre, with other grains completing the carbohydrate requirements. Minerals and vitamins are added during production of rabbit pellets to meet the nutritional requirements of the domestic rabbit. Along with pellets, many commercial rabbit raisers also feed one or more types of loose hay; alfalfa in particular is used for the growth needs of young rabbits, though it may be too high in protein and calcium for adult rabbits. Common sources of hay for rabbits include bluegrass, brome, fescue, marsh, orchard, timothy, oat and ryegrass.

=== Reproduction ===
Rabbit kits suckling

Rabbits are prolific breeders, in part because rabbits reach breeding age quickly. To prevent unwanted offspring, rabbits may be spayed or neutered at sexual maturity. Sexual maturity is determined as the point at which the production rate of spermatozoa stops increasing, which ranges based on the size of the breed: 4–5 months for small breeds (e.g., Mini Rex, Netherland Dwarf), 4–6 months for medium-sized breeds (e.g., Rex, New Zealand), and 5–8 months for large breeds (e.g., Flemish Giant). Bucks usually require more time to sexually mature than does.

=== Dewlaps ===
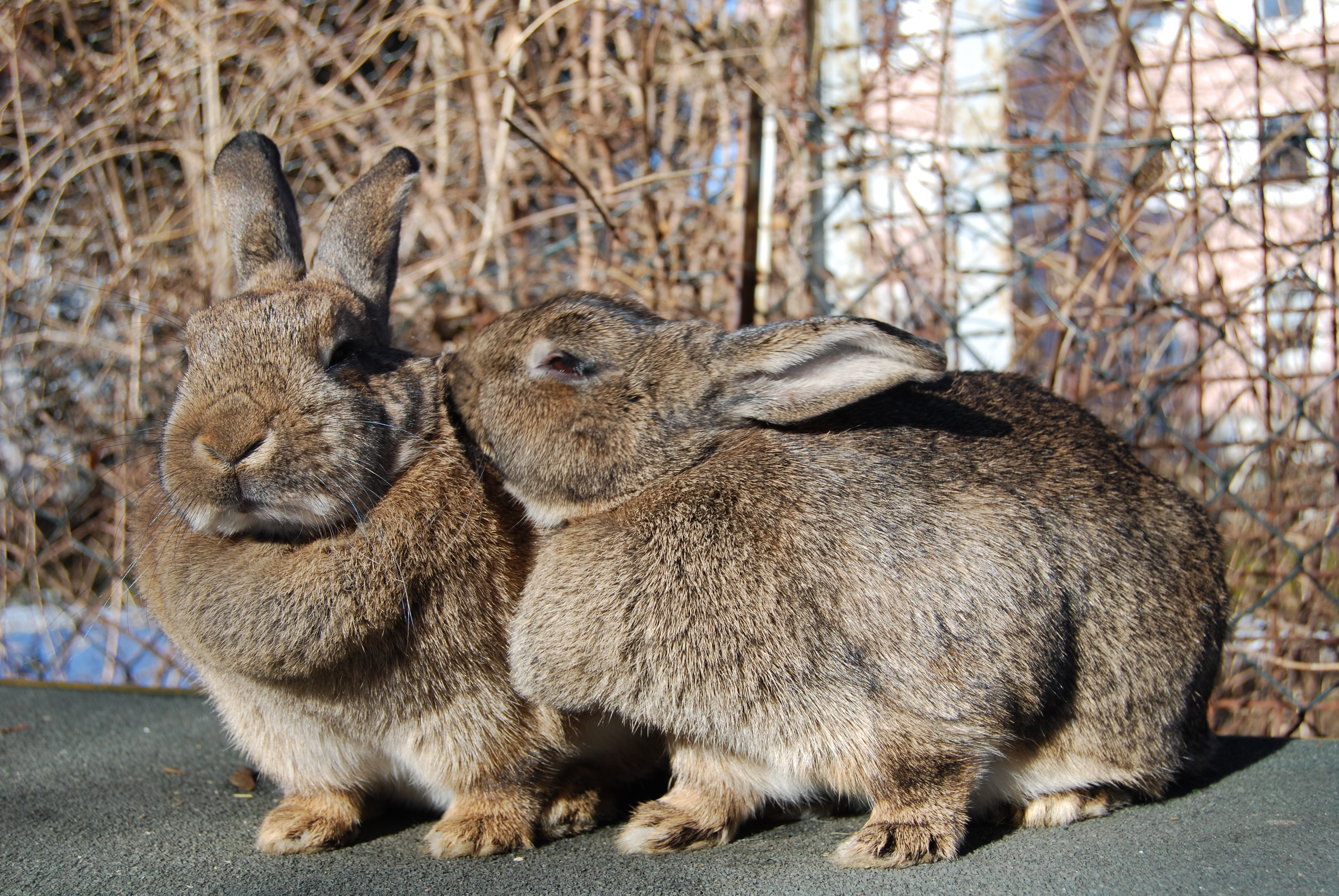
A pair of rabbits with dewlaps

A dewlap is a flap of skin or similar flesh that hangs beneath the lower jaw or neck. It is a secondary sex characteristic in rabbits, caused by the presence of female sex hormones. They develop with puberty. A female rabbit which has been neutered before reaching sexual maturity will not develop a dewlap, and even if a doe is neutered after developing a dewlap, the dewlap will gradually disappear over several months. This also aligns with the results of injecting male rabbits with female sex hormones, specifically the ones from pregnant women's urine; the male rabbits developed dewlaps, which then gradually disappeared once administration had ceased. (Note: This is not the process of the rabbit test, a common way to test for human female pregnancy in the 20th century; the pregnancy test involved dissecting female rabbits after injection with urine to see if their ovaries had enlarged.) In some breeds of domesticated rabbit, particularly those bred for their meat, the dewlap is formed more readily in males; physically larger breeds generally develop larger dewlaps.

The function of the dewlap is to provide soft material for the pregnant female rabbit to line its nest with. Fur is plucked directly from the rabbit's own dewlap, sides, and abdomen for use as nesting material. The fur of the dewlap becomes particularly loose roughly 5 days before the young are born due to higher levels of the hormones testosterone and prolactin, allowing it to be plucked easier. Wet dermatitis and dermatophytoses, both afflictions of the skin, are common ailments of the dewlap.

== Health ==
Rabbit health is a well-studied area in veterinary medicine, owing to the long history of rabbit domestication and the use of rabbits as laboratory animals. In pet rabbits, disease is rare when raised in sanitary conditions and provided with adequate care. Rabbits have fragile bones, especially in their spines, and need support on the bottom when they are picked up. In domestic rabbits, a significant concern is that they will gnaw on almost anything, including electrical cords (possibly leading to electrocution), potentially poisonous plants, and material like carpet and fabric that may cause life-threatening intestinal blockages.

Domestic practices that are associated with adverse health effects in rabbits include failure to spay females, declawing, and improper housing leading to sore hocks and stress. Domestic rabbits, like wild rabbits, are also susceptible to viral diseases such as myxomatosis, rabbit haemorrhagic disease, and West Nile virus, and vaccination is not required or possible for these diseases in all jurisdictions.

Few European rabbits, both domestic and wild, live longer than 9 years. One pet rabbit in Tanzania reportedly lived to nearly 19 years, and records from zoos and parks put their maximum age at roughly 13 years.

== Breeds ==
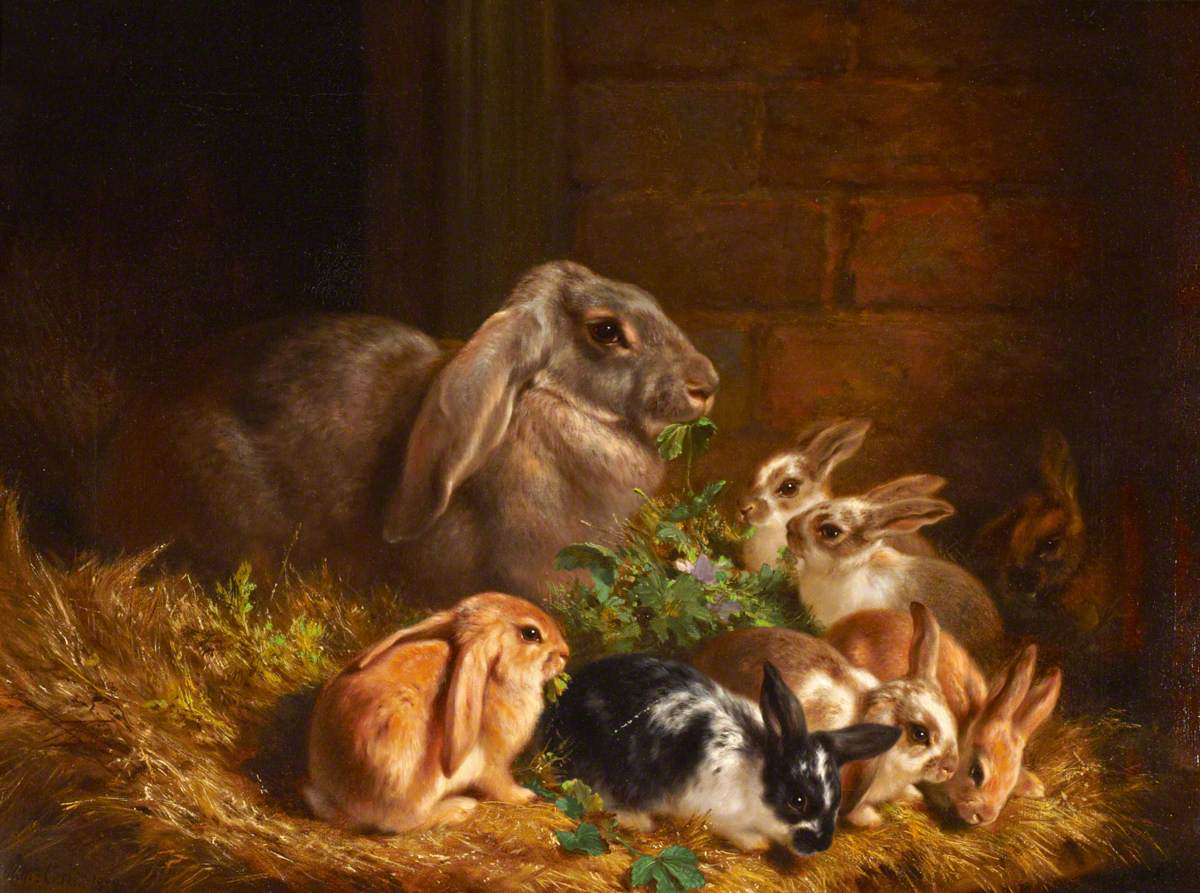
Various rabbit breeds painted by Samuel John Carter (1835–1892)

As of 2017, there were at least 305 breeds of domestic rabbit in 70 countries around the world. The American Rabbit Breeders Association currently recognises 52 rabbit breeds and the British Rabbit Council recognises 106. Selective breeding has produced rabbits ranging in size from dwarf to giant. Across the world, rabbits are raised as livestock (in cuniculture) for their meat, pelts, and wool, and also by fanciers and hobbyists as pets.

Rabbits have been selectively bred since ancient times to achieve certain desired characteristics. Variations include size and body shape, coat type (including hair length and texture), coat colour, ear carriage (erect or lop), and ear length. As with any animal, domesticated rabbits' temperaments vary in such factors as energy level and novelty seeking.

Many genetic defects in the domestic rabbit (such as dental problems in the Holland Lop breed) are due to recessive genes. Genetics are carefully tracked by fanciers who show rabbits, to breed out defects.

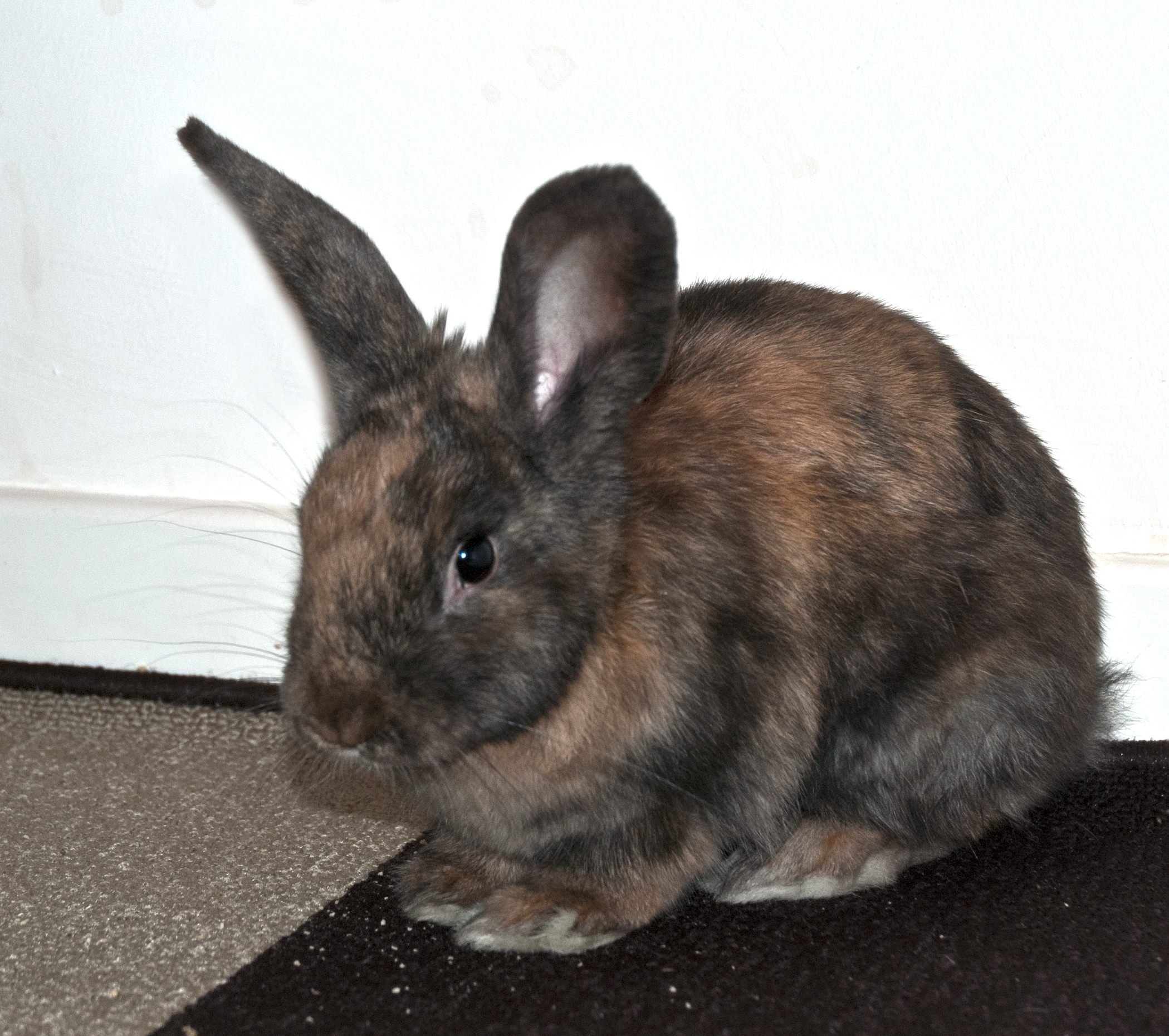
A domestic harlequin rabbit

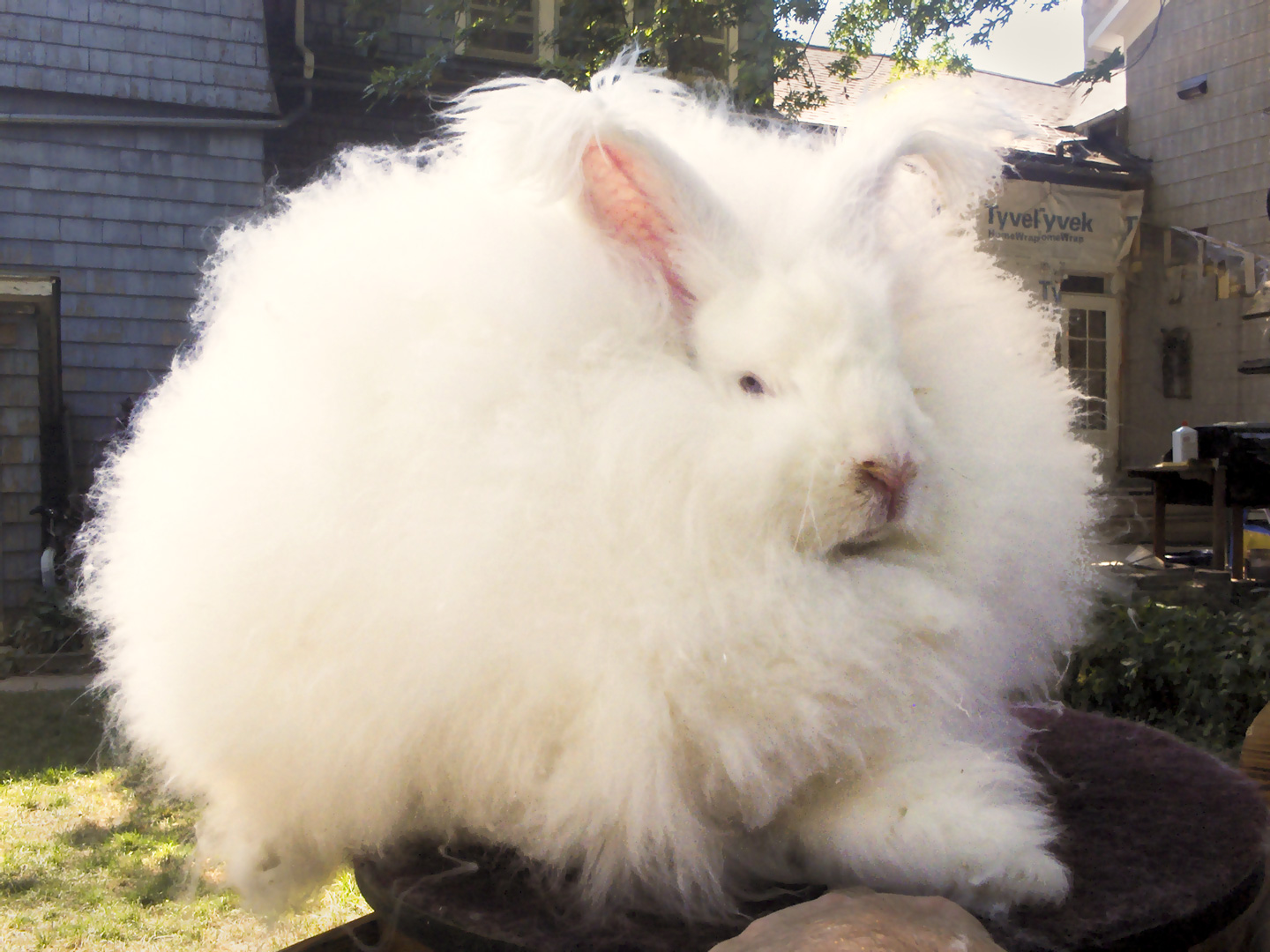
A giant angora rabbit

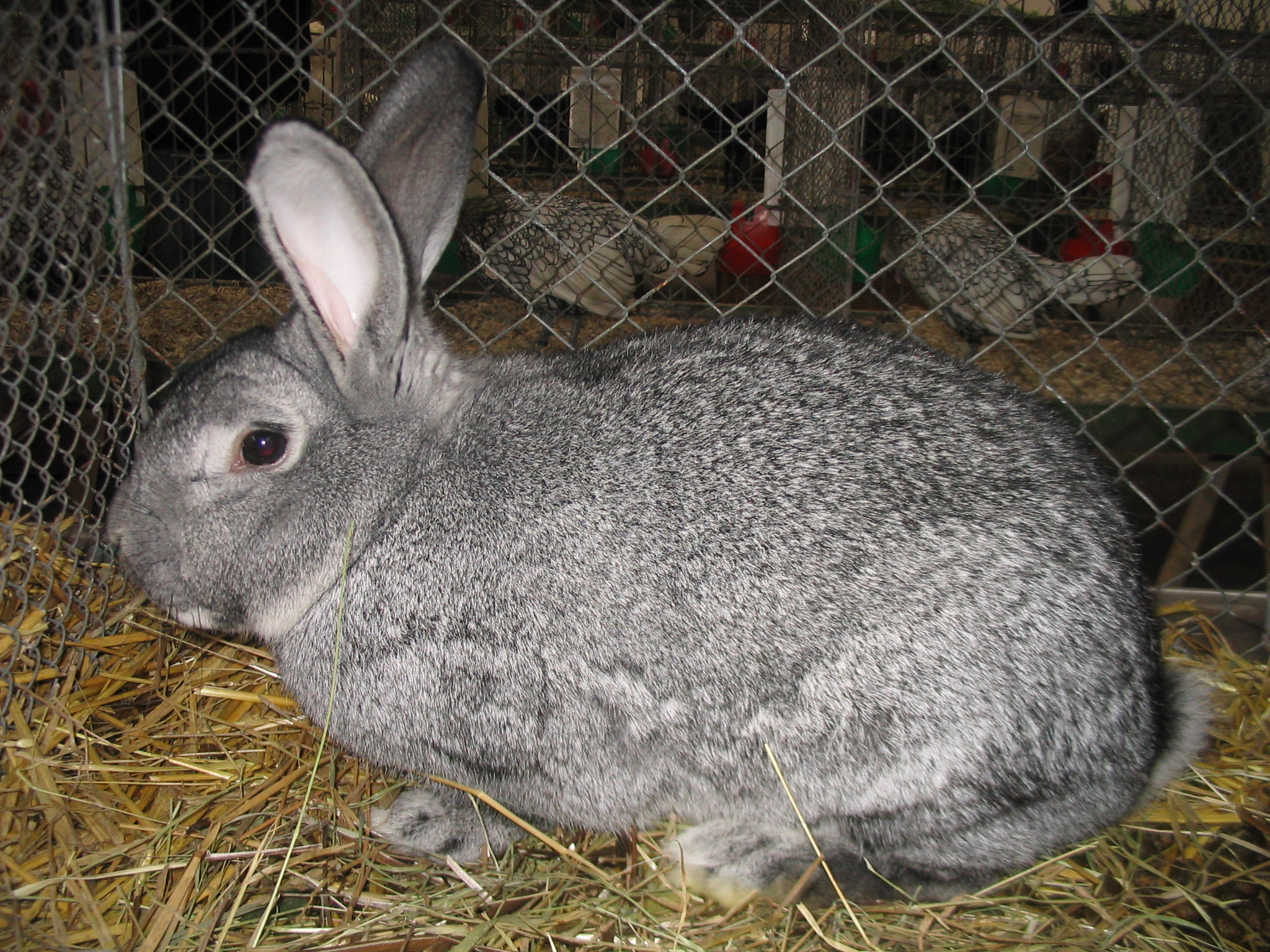
A standard chinchilla rabbit

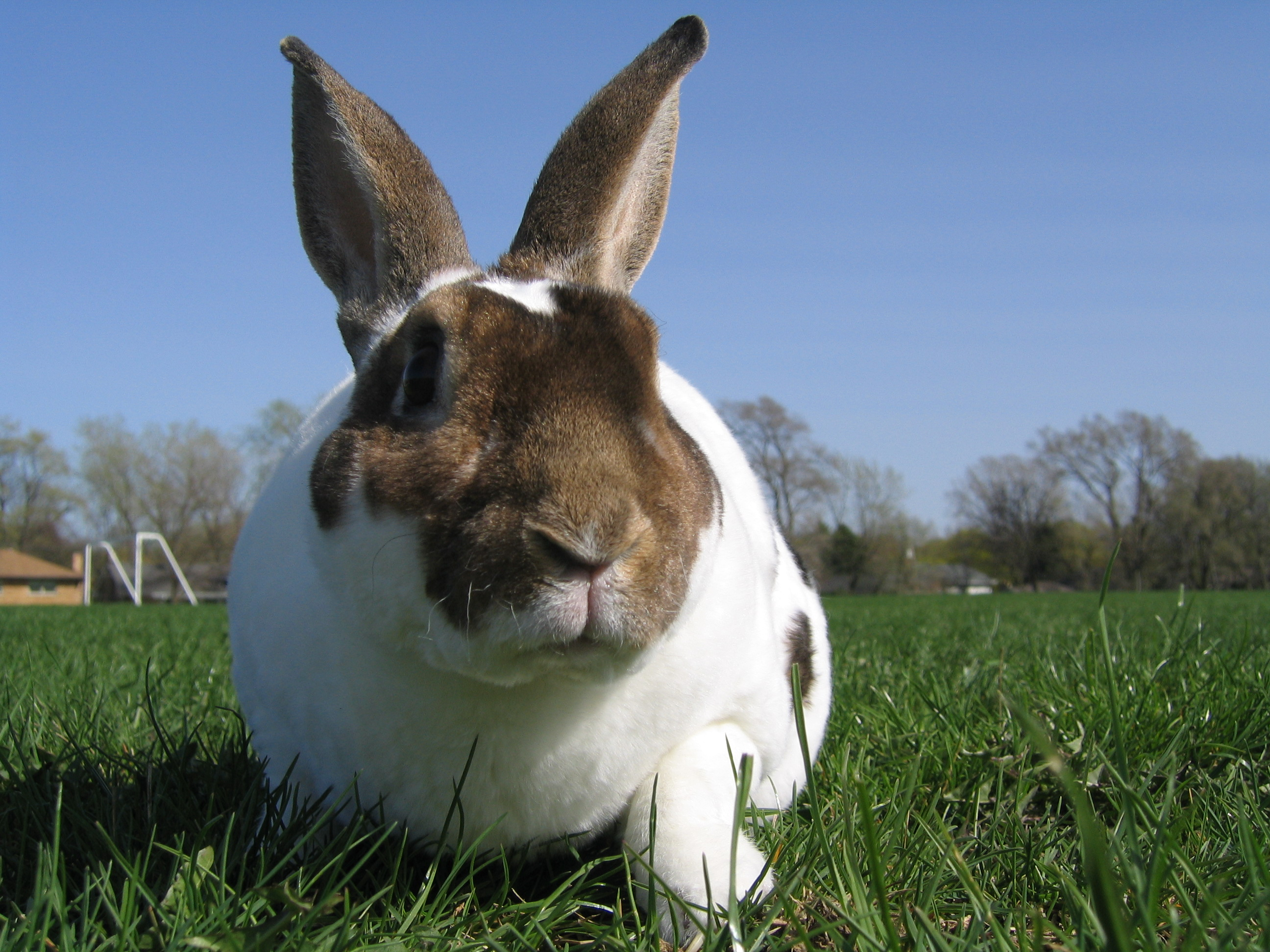
A broken castor rex rabbit

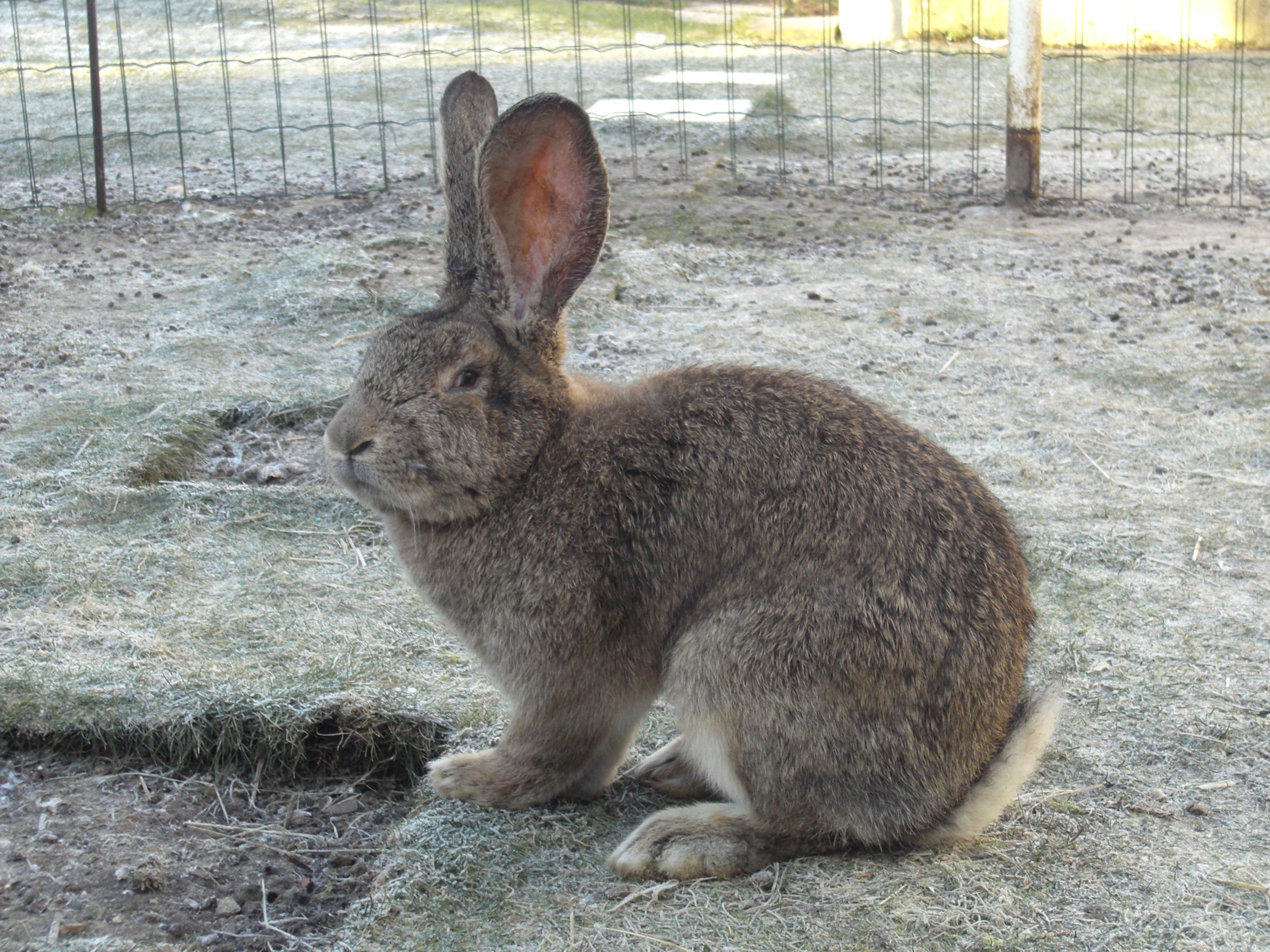
A Flemish Giant, one of the largest breeds

== As pets ==
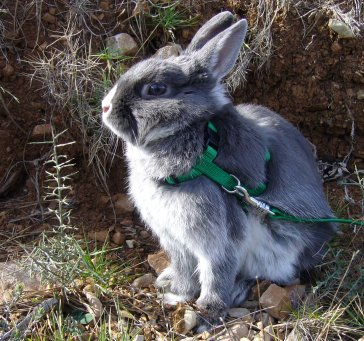
A 9-month-old dwarf house rabbit visiting the outdoors with a harness and leash

Rabbits have been kept as pets in Western nations since the 19th century. Rabbits can bond with humans, and can learn to follow simple voice commands and to come when called.

Rabbits are easily injured by rough handling, can bite when hurt or frightened, and are easily frightened by loud noises and sudden motions, which has caused them to be discouraged for use as pets for children. With the right guidance, rabbits can be trained to live indoors.

Rabbits are especially popular as pets in the United States during the Easter season, due to their association with the holiday. However, animal shelters that accept rabbits often complain that during the weeks and months following Easter, there is a rise in unwanted and neglected rabbits that were bought as Easter gifts, especially for children. Similar problems arise in rural areas after county fairs and the like, even in jurisdictions where animals are not legal as prizes in fairground games.

There are many humane societies, animal shelters, and rescue groups that have rabbits available for pet adoption. Fancy rabbit breeds are often purchased from pet stores, private breeders, and fanciers. Breed availability varies based on geographic distribution, with some breeds being more popular in different countries or regions. Because of the destructive history of feral rabbits in Australia, domestic rabbits are illegal as pets in Queensland.

=== House rabbits ===
House rabbit noises
Noises made by a pet rabbit

Rabbits may be kept inside as small pets. Rabbits that live indoors are less exposed to the dangers of predators, parasites, diseases, adverse weather, and pesticides, which in turn increases their lifespan. Cages are generally too small for most rabbits to live comfortably—even laboratory rabbits require significant space and enrichment—and rabbit welfare groups recommend that instead of a cage, domestic rabbits free-roam. The House Rabbit Society recommends "rabbit-proofing" areas to reduce the risks associated with their intrinsic need to chew. Along with their chewing instincts, Rabbits inherit burrowing behaviours from their wild counterparts that may need be addressed by their owner(s). Rabbits are easily litter box trained.

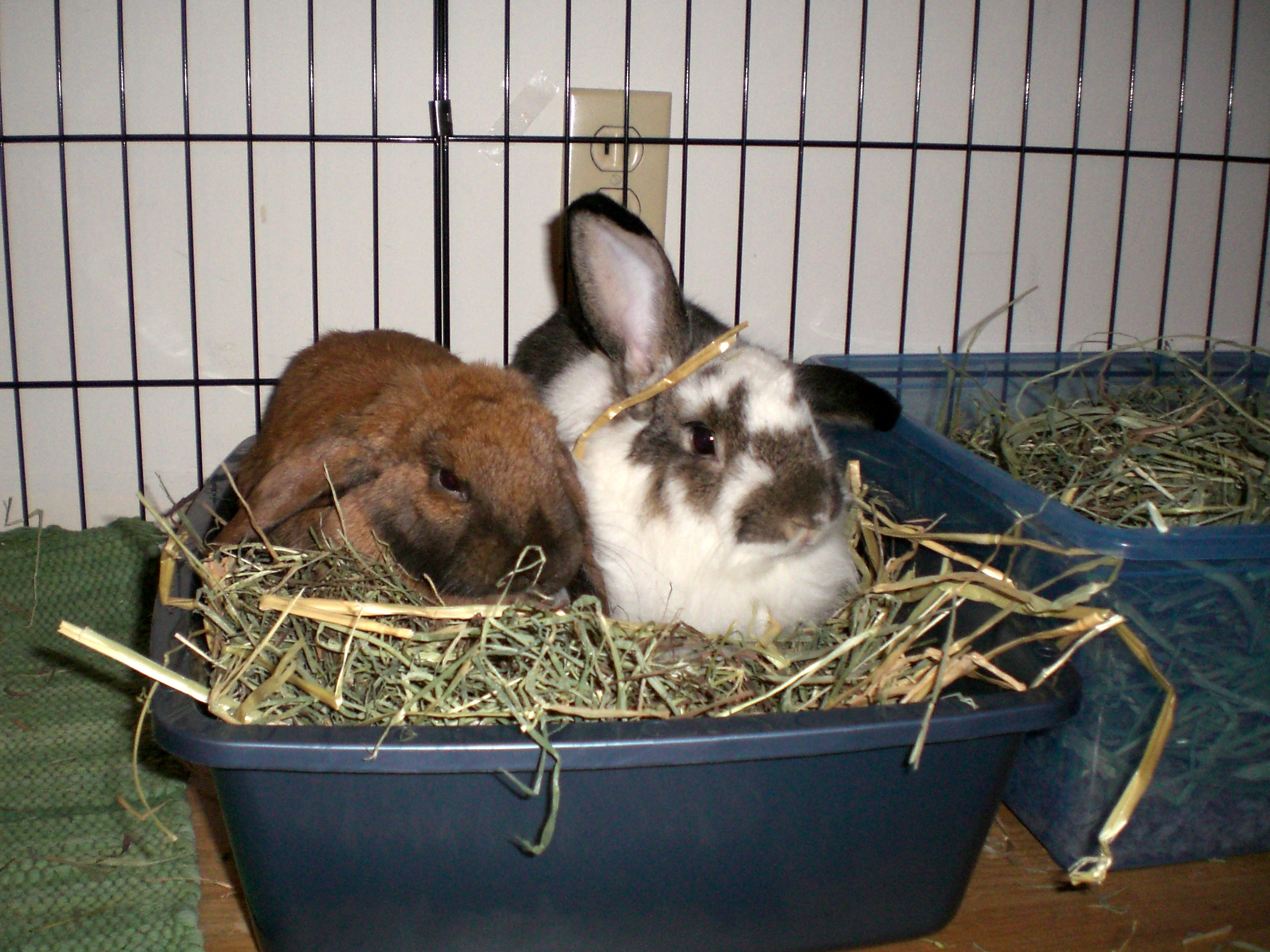
Two house rabbits in their litter box

Pet rabbits express their emotions in varying ways, such as a movement known as a 'binky' or 'binkying' when happy, or 'thumping' their hind legs when upset.

=== Bonding ===
Rabbits are social animals and will bond with other rabbits in or around their territory. Rabbit welfare groups encourage owners to make efforts towards bonding rabbits as part of normal socialisation, which usually involves carefully supervised meetings between rabbits on neutral territory. This helps minimise territorial aggression and allows the rabbits to establish a hierarchy. Over time, rabbits learn to tolerate each other's presence, form a social bond, and engage in vital social behaviours such as grooming, playing, and snuggling.

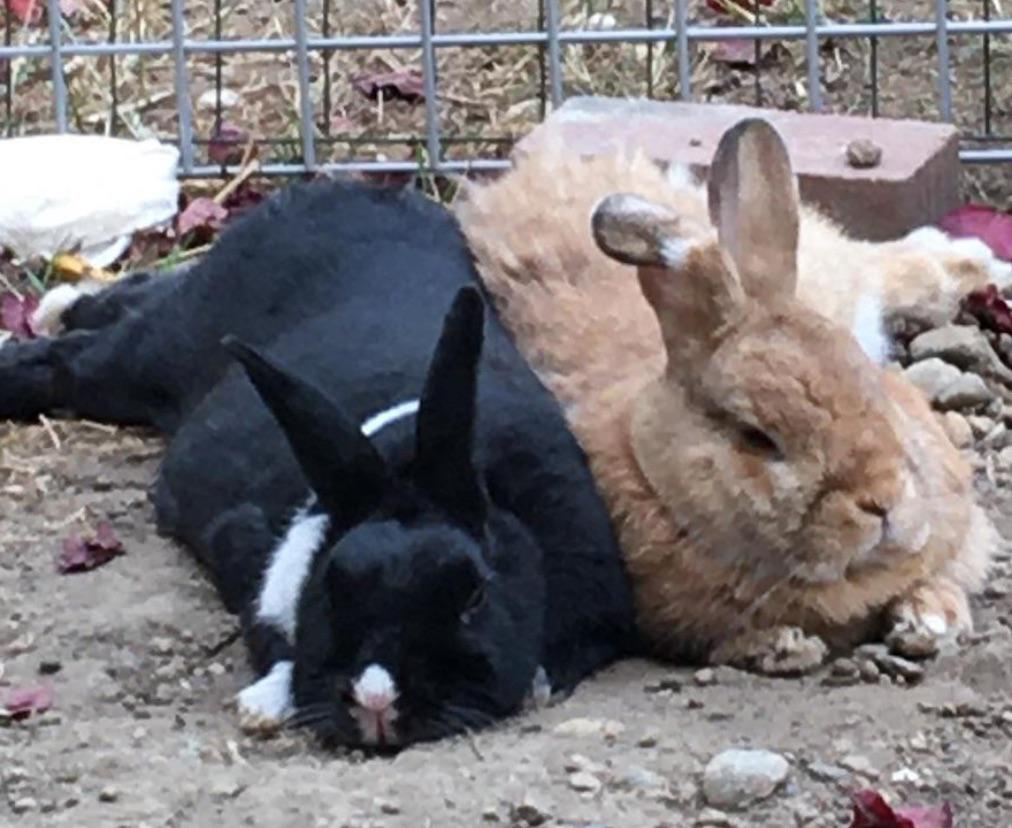
A bonded rabbit pair

During bonding, as rabbits become more comfortable with each other's presence, they often engage in mutual grooming sessions. Unneutered and unspayed rabbits tend to cause problems for owners when approaching maturity. Bonding is reportedly more difficult, intact males become territorial and will fight each other, and male-female pairings can have unwanted pregnancies.

When rabbit bonds break, it can have detrimental effects on their physical and emotional well-being. Rabbits are highly social animals, and sudden separation from a bonded partner can cause stress and anxiety. This stress can lead to health issues, such as gastrointestinal problems, reduced appetite, and a weakened immune system. Additionally, the sudden absence of a grooming partner can result in neglected fur, making the rabbit more susceptible to matting and skin issues.

Dogs and cats pose a threat to rabbits unless trained and properly managed, and will not bond the same way rabbits will with each other. Rabbits are not compatible with birds or guinea pigs despite the fact they were commonly kept together in the past; relationships between rabbits and guinea pigs have been described as "at best, neutral" and can involve fighting or transfer of disease.

=== Care ===
Not all veterinarians will treat rabbits, and pet owners may have to seek out an exotic animal veterinarian for their rabbit's care. Rabbits may hide signs of illness or disease, and literature published on the care of house rabbits recommends owners to regularly schedule veterinary checkups to identify hidden issues. Works on rabbit care also advise regular nail trimming, coat brushing and items to chew on.

Baby rabbits under eight weeks old are susceptible to enteritis, along with gut stasis and bloat.

Pet rabbits can often exhibit behavioural problems, including aggression towards humans and other animals, particularly with poor husbandry. Rabbits may or may not react favourably to handling and petting, depending on their personality and how they were raised. Rabbit owners can seek behavioural help through their vets and rabbit behaviorists.

Rabbit skeletons are light and fragile in comparison to their bodies, and are susceptible to trauma from falling, twisting and kicking. Improper handling of rabbits can lead to injury both to the rabbit and the owner. Rabbits also have needs that differ from other common household pets, which can lead to poor quality of life for the animal if their owners are unaware of these needs and often results in rabbits being returned to animal shelters. Inappropriate treatment of a rabbit can include inadequate diet, housing, or socialisation. Rabbits also have a body language that is more subtle than that of common domestic pets, such as cats and dogs, and compared to these species are prey animals rather than predators, which poses different challenges to a potential owner.

A Mini Rex eating a strawberry

The diet of a pet rabbit is variable and differs from that of wild rabbits, which may have to consume lower-quality food items such as twigs and shrubs to survive. For house rabbits, it is advised that they do not live on a fruit majority diet, as fruits contain high sugar content, but can be given as a treat. Publications on the care of house rabbits advise various diets based on age in order to ensure the longevity of a pet.

=== Housing ===
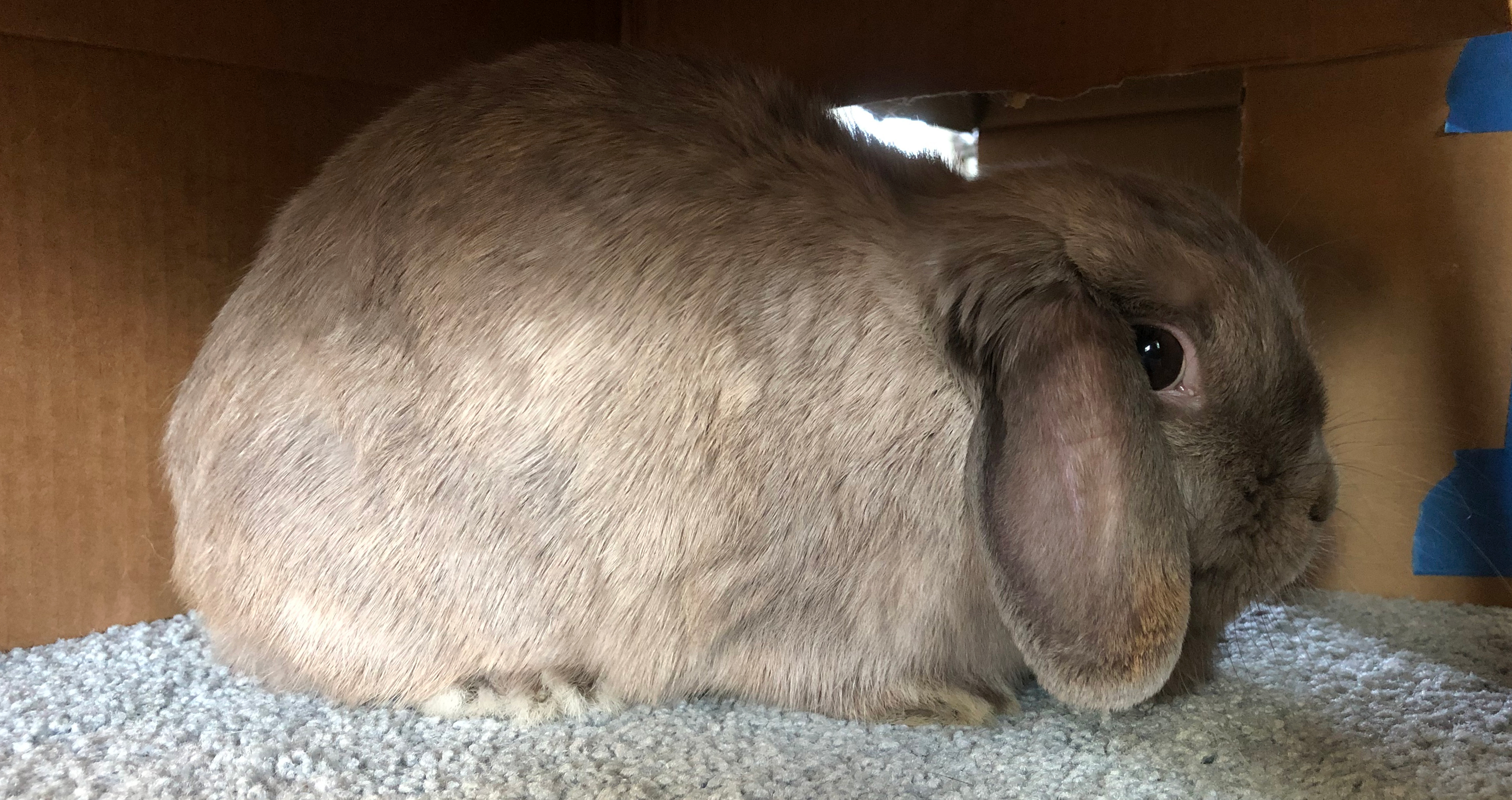
A Holland Lop hiding

Rabbits can live outdoors in properly constructed, sheltered enclosures, which provide protection from the elements in winter and keep rabbits cool in summer heat. To protect from predators, rabbit enclosures are usually situated in a shed, barn, or other enclosed structure, which may also contain a larger pen for exercise. The Rabbit Welfare Association has recommended that a pair of average size rabbits are kept in an area of at least 3m x 2m by 1m high. Outdoor housing arrangements in hutches or unsupervised periods when rabbits are outdoors, even when properly secured, may still pose hazards such as temperature extremes, lack of social interaction between rabbits, and disease from digging in soil.

=== Shows ===
Much like conformation shows for dog breeds and cat shows for pedigreed cats, rabbits can be exhibited at rabbit shows, where they may be judged based on breed standards. Some argue rabbit shows are unethical as they involve transporting and caging the animals in stressful conditions. Most rabbit shows are organised or sanctioned by the American Rabbit Breeders Association (ARBA), which recognises 52 breeds in its Standard of Perfection 2021–2025. However, rabbit shows have been organised by various groups since at least the 19th century.

Show rabbits are judged based on physical conformation to a published breed standard, and may separately include a behavioural or "showmanship" assessment. Important criteria in rabbit judging include coat condition, body shape, ear length and toenail condition.

==== Show jumping ====
Rabbit show jumping, a form of animal sport between rabbits, began in the 1970s in Sweden and has since become popular in the United States and Australia. Unlike judging shows, show jumping is largely a spectator sport. When rabbit jumping was first starting out, the rules of competition were the same as horse show jumping rules. However, rules were later changed to reflect a rabbit's abilities. The first national championship for rabbit show jumping was held in Stockholm, Sweden in 1987.

=== Abandonment ===
Many pet rabbits are abandoned by their owners, especially those purchased as "Easter bunnies". In 2017, they were the United States' third most abandoned pet. Rabbits are also frequently abandoned or relinquished to shelters due to challenges with rabbit housing, behavioural issues, or simply a loss of interest in the pet. Some of these abandoned pets are adopted and go on to find a new stable home. As domestic rabbits have been bred to be docile compared to wild rabbits, abandoned and escaped domestic rabbits are significantly less able to care and fend for themselves than wild rabbits, and many do not survive for long.

== Human uses ==
Rabbits have been kept as livestock since ancient times for their meat, and in modern times have been raised for wool, fur, and use in scientific research as laboratory animals.

=== Meat rabbits ===
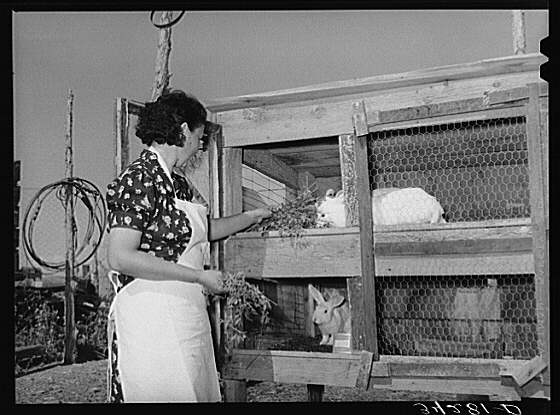
Meat-breed rabbits in hutches

Rabbits have been raised for commercial meat production in various parts of the world since at least the early 1900s. Intensive efforts to efficiently farm rabbits for meat began in the 1920s in southern California, and developed through the use of techniques such as artificial insemination in addition to the general advancement of rabbit veterinary medicine, nutritional needs and disease control. Breeds such as the New Zealand and Californian are frequently utilised for meat in commercial rabbitries. These breeds have efficient metabolisms and grow quickly; they are ready for slaughter by approximately 14 to 16 weeks of age. The main consumer of rabbit meat in the world was China, as of 2017, though the production of rabbit meat in China has decreased by 33.8% from 2010 to 2020, and global production has decreased by 24.1% over the same period.

Rabbit fryers are the most common type of rabbit sold for meat, and make up more than 85% of the market share. They are raised to roughly 2 months of age, and weigh between 1.7–2 kg (3.7–4.4 lb) live weight. Rabbit roasters, stewers and "mature rabbits" make up a less defined category with a smaller portion of the market share. They generally have a live weight of over 1.8 kg (4.0 lb) and are raised to over 6 months of age. Stewers have been additionally described as rabbits weighing over 3 kg (6.6 lb) and as a category marketed at a lower price than fryers. Some rabbit farmers opt to sell the skins of slaughtered rabbits to supplement income; the skins of meat rabbits may be dried with heat alone and are often sold without tanning.

=== Wool rabbits ===
Rabbits such as the Angora, American Fuzzy Lop, and Jersey Wooly produce wool. However, since the American Fuzzy Lop and Jersey Wooly are both dwarf breeds, only the much larger Angora breeds such as the English Angora, Satin Angora, Giant Angora, and French Angoras are used for commercial wool production. Their long fur is sheared, combed, or plucked (gently pulling loose hairs from the body during moulting) and then spun into yarn used to make a variety of products. Angora sweaters can be purchased in many clothing stores and is generally mixed with other types of wool due to the poor durability of angora fibres on their own.

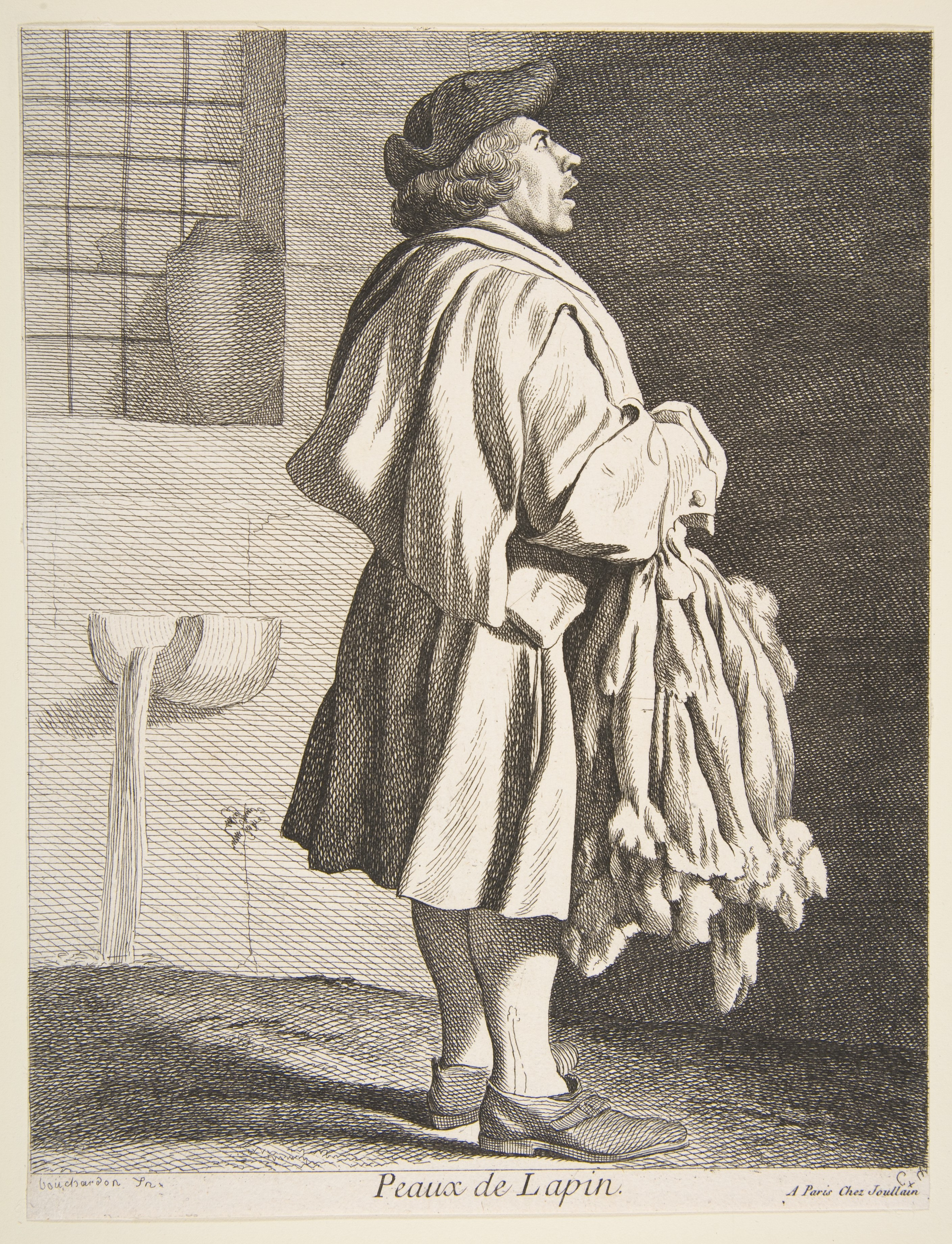
Peaux de Lapin ("Rabbit skins") by Edme Bouchardon (1737)

=== Fur rabbits ===
Rabbit skins are often produced as a byproduct of the meat production process, but some breeds have been bred specifically for superior fur quality. The main breed raised for its fur is the Rex rabbit. White rabbit fur may be dyed in an array of colours that are not produced naturally, which has introduced demand for furs from New Zealand White rabbits; the practise of deceptively dyeing white furs to look like the pelts of other animals was popular in the 1930s. Rabbits in the fur industry are fed a diet focused for robust coat production and pelts are harvested after the rabbit reaches prime condition, which takes longer than in the meat industry. Rabbit fur is used in local and commercial textile industries throughout the world.

=== Experimentation ===
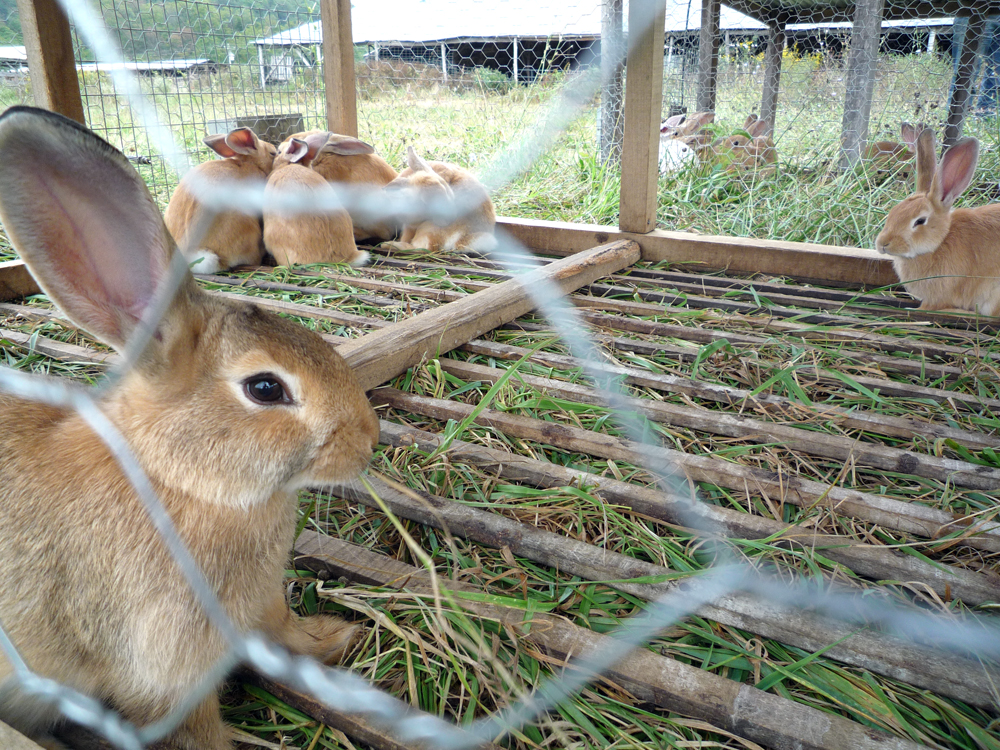
Pasture-raised rabbits in a moveable enclosure

Rabbits have been and continue to be used in laboratory work such as production of antibodies for vaccines and research of human male reproductive system toxicology. In 1972, around 450,000 rabbits were used for experiments in the United States, decreasing to around 240,000 in 2006. The Environmental Health Perspective, published by the National Institute of Health, states, "The rabbit [is] an extremely valuable model for studying the effects of chemicals or other stimuli on the male reproductive system." Rabbits are also used in the study of bronchial asthma and related lung diseases, stroke prevention treatments, cystic fibrosis, diabetes, and cancer.

The New Zealand White is one of the most commonly used breeds for research and testing.

==== Cosmetics testing ====
Rabbits have been used for the Draize test, a method of testing cosmetics on animals. Animal rights activists have opposed animal experimentation for non-medical purposes, such as the testing of cosmetic and cleaning products, citing it as an example of cruelty in animal research. These efforts have resulted in the decreased use of rabbits in these areas. Albino rabbits are typically used in the Draize tests because they have less tear flow than other animals, and the lack of eye pigment makes the effects easier to visualise.
